= Wangcheng Economic and Technological Development Zone =

Wangcheng Economic and Technological Development Zone (simplified Chinese: 望城经济技术开发区; traditional Chinese: 望城經濟技術開發區; pinyin: Wàngchéng Jīngjì Jìshù Kāifāqū; abbr: WETZ) is an economic and technical development zone (ETZ) in Wangcheng District of Changsha City, Hunan Province, China, one of four ETZs at state level in Changsha. It was established on 13 July 2000, its old name is the High - Tech Food Industrial Base of Hunan Province (湖南省高科技食品工业基地), similar to a development zone at provincial level; renamed to the present name on 21 July 2006. It was upgraded to an ETZ at state level on 15 February 2014.

The Wangcheng ETZ is located in the south west of the seat of Wangcheng District, it covers Baishazhou, Huangjinyuan, Jinshanqiao and Wushan 4 subdistricts. It has an approved area of 6.33 km^{2} (2.44 sq mi) and a planning area of 59.6 km^{2} (23.0 sq mi). The dominant industries in the zone are non-ferrous metal new materials, food, electronic information and business logistics. As of 2015, there are 635 registered enterprises, 32 of the total are public or the global Top500 companies. The total industrial gross output in the zone hits 77 billion yuan (US$12.36 billion) and the industrial added value is 20 billion yuan (US$3.21 billion). In 2016, its total gross output of scale-sized industries reaches 90 billion yuan (US$13.55 billion).
