= Shahe =

Shahe (沙河) may refer to:

- Shahe, Hebei (沙河市), county-level city of Xingtai, Hebei
- Shahe, Liuji (沙河村), a village in Liuji, Dawu County, Xiaogan, Hubei
- Shahe River (Xiang River tributary), a left-bank tributary of Xiang River
- Shahe railway station (沙河站), a station on Beijing-Baotou railway and Beijing-Zhangjiakou intercity railway in Beijing
- Shahe station (disambiguation) (沙河站), multiple metro stations in China
- Shahe fen (沙河粉), a type of wide Chinese noodle made from rice

== See also ==
- Shahe Town (disambiguation) (沙河镇)
- Shahe Subdistrict (disambiguation) (沙河街道)
