= Shahe River (Xiang River tributary) =

Right-bank tributary of Xiang River in Hunan, China

Coordinates: 28°20′29.05″N 112°54′22.35″E

Shahe River (Chinese: 沙河; lit. 'sand river'), also known as Xianing River (Chinese: 霞凝河; pinyin: xiáníng hé), is a right-bank tributary of Xiang River in Hunan, China. It rises in Fenshui'ao (Chinese: 分水坳), Chuanshanping Town, southwest of Miluo City, The river runs Qiaoyi Town and Dingziwan Subdistrict of Wangcheng District and Qingzhuhu Subdistrict of Kaifu District through Changsha before linking up with the Xiang River.

The Shahe is a 34-kilometre-long (21 mi) river in the east bank of Xiang River, which flows westward from Miluo and joins the Xiang at Xianinggang (Chinese: 霞凝港). The drainage basin of the Shahe River is 322 square kilometres (124 sq mi).

The river flows generally from north to south. The source of the river is on high ground near the south of seat of Chuanshanping Town, from whence it runs south, very close to and almost parallel with the Beijing–Guangzhou Railway which is located on the eastern side of the river. On the western bank of Shahe River, a road runs all along, the section of the levee road in Miluo is county route X059, that of which in Wangcheng District of Changsha is county route X056 or X057.
