= Shizhu River =

River in Changsha, China

Coordinates: 28°24′43″N 112°49′49″E

Shizhu River (Chinese: 石渚河; pinyin: shízhǔ hé; lit. 'stony river') is a right-bank tributary of Xiang River in Wangcheng District of Changsha, Hunan Province, China. The river has three sources merging into the trunk stream at Daigongqiao (Chinese: 戴公桥). The right branch (northern branch) is its main stream which rises in the Jiufeng Mountain (Chinese: 九峰山), the headwaters are a group of reservoirs including Chating Reservoir (Chinese: 茶亭水库), Sichong Reservoir (Chinese: 寺充水库) and Nanchong Reservoir (Chinese: 南充水库) located in Chating Town. The main river runs through Chating and Qiaoyi 2 towns and Tongguan Subdistrict before linking up with the Xiang River. It has a length of 25 kilometres (16 mi) with a drainage basin area of rough 60 square kilometres (23 sq mi). Its drainage basin covers Shizhu (Chinese: 石渚村), Caitaoyuan (Chinese: 彩陶源村), Heqiao (Chinese: 何桥村), Gguoliang villages of Tongguan Subdistrict, Baishi (Chinese: 白石村) of Qiaoyi Town, Xihusi (Chinese: 西湖寺村), Shiziling (Chinese: 狮子岭村), Daigongqiao (Chinese: 戴公桥村), Wangqun (Chinese: 望群村), Meihualing (Chinese: 梅花岭社区), Tanjiayuan (Chinese: 谭家园村) and Jiufengshan (Chinese: 九峰山村) villages of Chating Town.

The source of the main stem of the Shizhu River is Chating Reservoir. Water enters the river through sluice gate. The main stem flows southeast confluence with the middle branch and south branch at Daigongqiao in the eastern side of Hunan provincial route S102．From here the river flows west, after inflowing several streams in Shizhu Batardeau (Chinese: 石渚垸), it joins Xiang River at Lanjiapo (Chinese: 兰家坡) Mouth.
