= Jinshanqiao =

Coordinates: 24°56′N 117°31′E

Jinshanqiao Subdistrict 金山桥街道
- Subdistrict
- Interactive map of Jinshanqiao Subdistrict
- Country: People's Republic of China
- Province: Hunan
- Prefecture-level city: Changsha
- District: Wangcheng

Area
  - Total: 24.07 km^{2} (9.29 sq mi)

Population (2013)
  - Total: 20,858
  - Density: 866.6/km^{2} (2,244/sq mi)
- Time zone: UTC+8 (China Standard)

Jinshanqiao (simplified Chinese: 金山桥街道; traditional Chinese: 金山橋街道; pinyin: Jīnshānqiáo Jiēdào) is a subdistrict of Wangcheng district, Changsha, Hunan, China. It is located on the center of West Wangcheng, the subdistrict is bordered by Wushan, Huangjinyuan subdistricts to the northwest, Leifeng to the southwest, Baishazhou, Gaotangling to the east. Jinshanqiao has an area of 24.07 km^{2} (9.29 sq mi) with a population of 20,858. The subdistrict has three villages under its jurisdiction.

== History ==
Jinshanqiao was formed by the revocation of Huangjin (and setting up three new subdistricts) in 2012.

In June 2012, Huangjin was changed from a town (黄金镇) as a subdistrict (黄金街道). On August 28, 2012, Huangjin was divided into three subdistricts, they are Jinshanqiao (金山桥街道), Huangjinyuan (黄金园街道) and Liaojiaping (廖家坪街道) subdistricts.

- The Jinshanqiao subdistrict contains Jinping (金坪社区), Jinshanqiao (金山桥社区) and Tonglin'ao (桐林坳社区) three residential communities.
- The Huangjinyuan subdistrict contains Guifang (桂芳村), Huangjinyuan (黄金园村) and Yingxiongling (英雄岭村) three villages.
- The Liaojiiaping subdistrict contains Baima (白马村), Liaojiaping (廖家坪村) and Sanyi (三益村) three villages. Liaojiaping was merged to Leifeng subdistrict on November 19, 2015.
