= Former residence of Lei Feng =

Building in Leifeng, Wangcheng, Changsha, Hunan, China

Former Residence of Lei Feng
- 雷锋故居
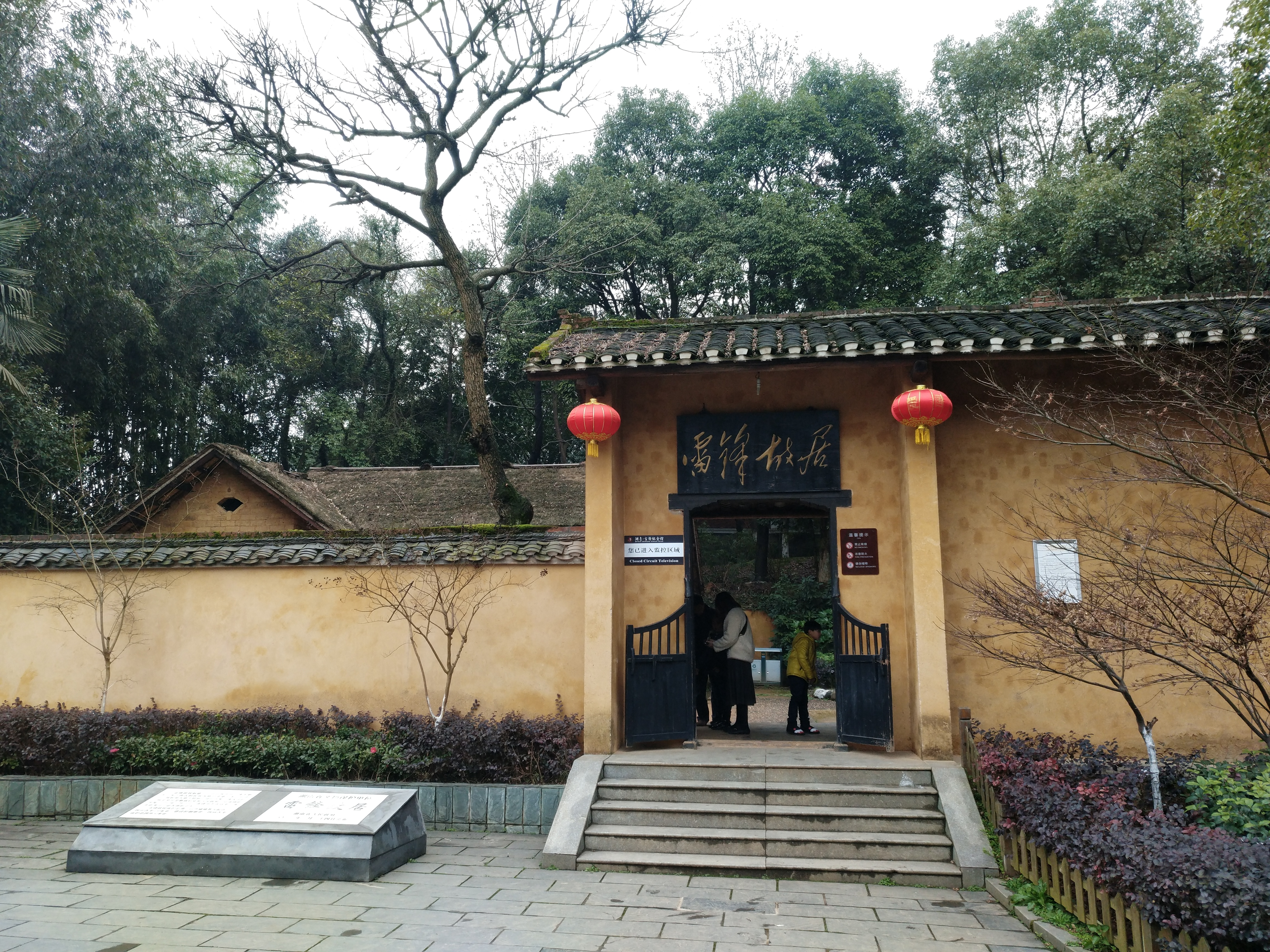
- Entrance of the Former Residence of Lei Feng.

- Location within Hunan Location within China

General information
- Type: Traditional folk houses
- Location: Leifeng Subdistrict, Wangcheng District, Changsha, Hunan, China
- Coordinates: 28°12′45″N 112°51′14″E
- Completed: 1900s
- Opened: 1993
- Renovated: 1993

Technical details
- Floor area: 180 m^{2} (1,900 sq ft)

The former residence of Lei Feng (simplified Chinese: 雷锋故居; traditional Chinese: 雷鋒故居; pinyin: Leí Fēng Gùjū) was the birthplace and childhood home of Lei Feng, a soldier in the People's Liberation Army. The residence is located in Leifeng Subdistrict of Wangcheng District, in northwestern Changsha, South Central China's Hunan province. It is currently a tourist attraction in Hunan.

== History ==
During the Qing dynasty (1644–1911), the former residence was established, then belonged to the landlord. On December 18, 1940, Lei Feng was born in the former residence of the old house, he lived until November 1956 when he was transferred to Wangcheng County. In 1958, the former residence was abandoned due to lack of maintenance. Lei Feng's cousin Lei Guangming rebuilt three thatched huts, and in the winter of 1966, the Hunan Provincial People's Government built a new Lei Feng Memorial Hall next to the former residence, and on November 20, 1968, Lei Feng Memorial Hall was officially opened to the public. In 1993, the People's Government of Wangcheng County rebuilt the residence and opened it to the public.

In January 2011, Hunan Provincial People's Government listed Lei Feng's former residence in the ninth batch of Hunan Provincial Cultural Relics Protection Units.

== Building ==
Lei Feng statue, located in the Lei Feng statue square, sculpted by the sculptor Zhu Weijing, with 5 meters high. Lei Feng Memorial Hall, located next to his former residence, was built in 1966-1968. On October 29, 1990, Jiang Zemin, then General Secretary of the Chinese Communist Party, inscribed it as "Lei Feng Memorial Hall". In 2002, the National Tourism Administration classified it as a 4A-level tourist attraction.

== Gallery ==
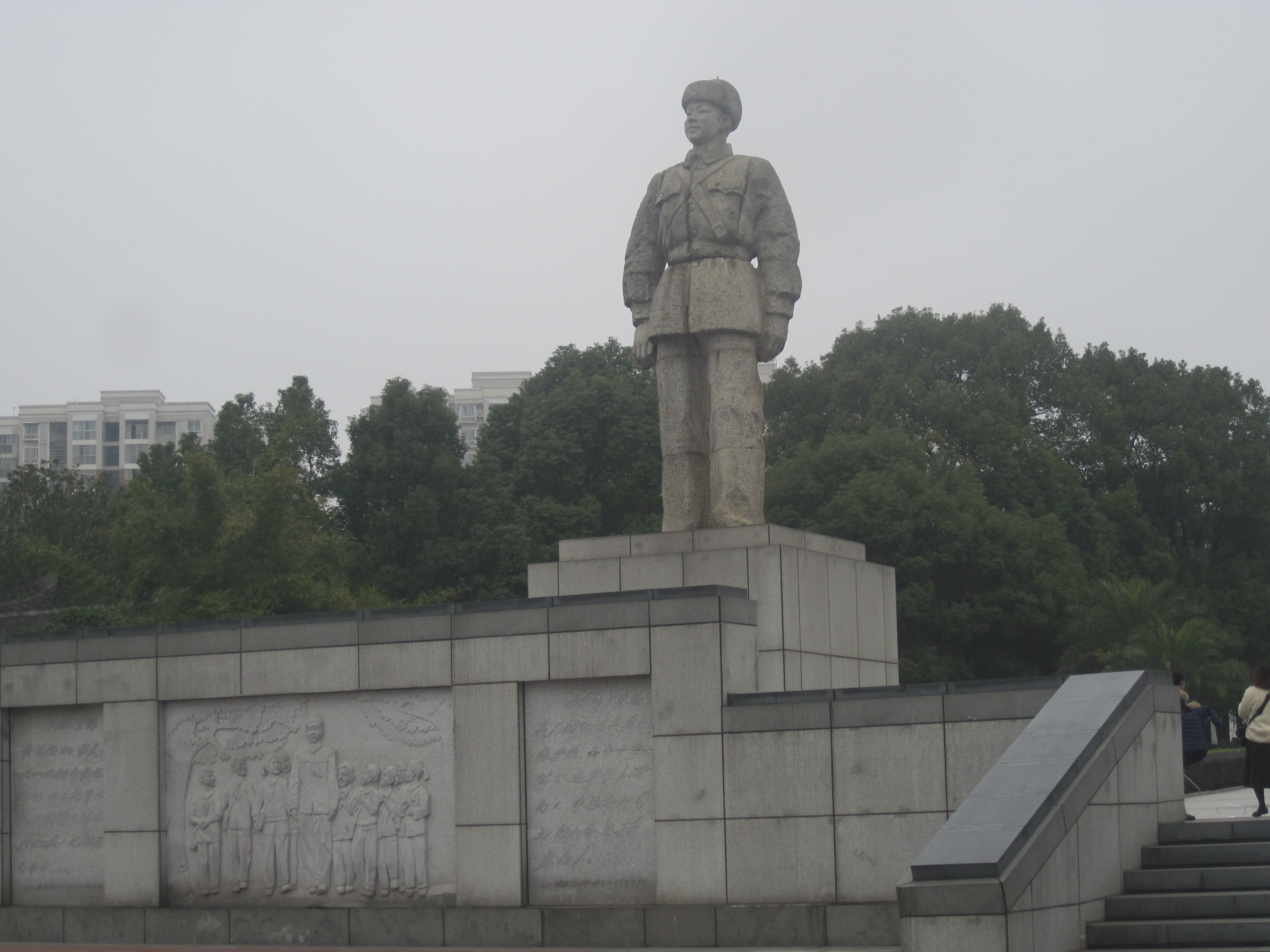
Statue of Lei Feng

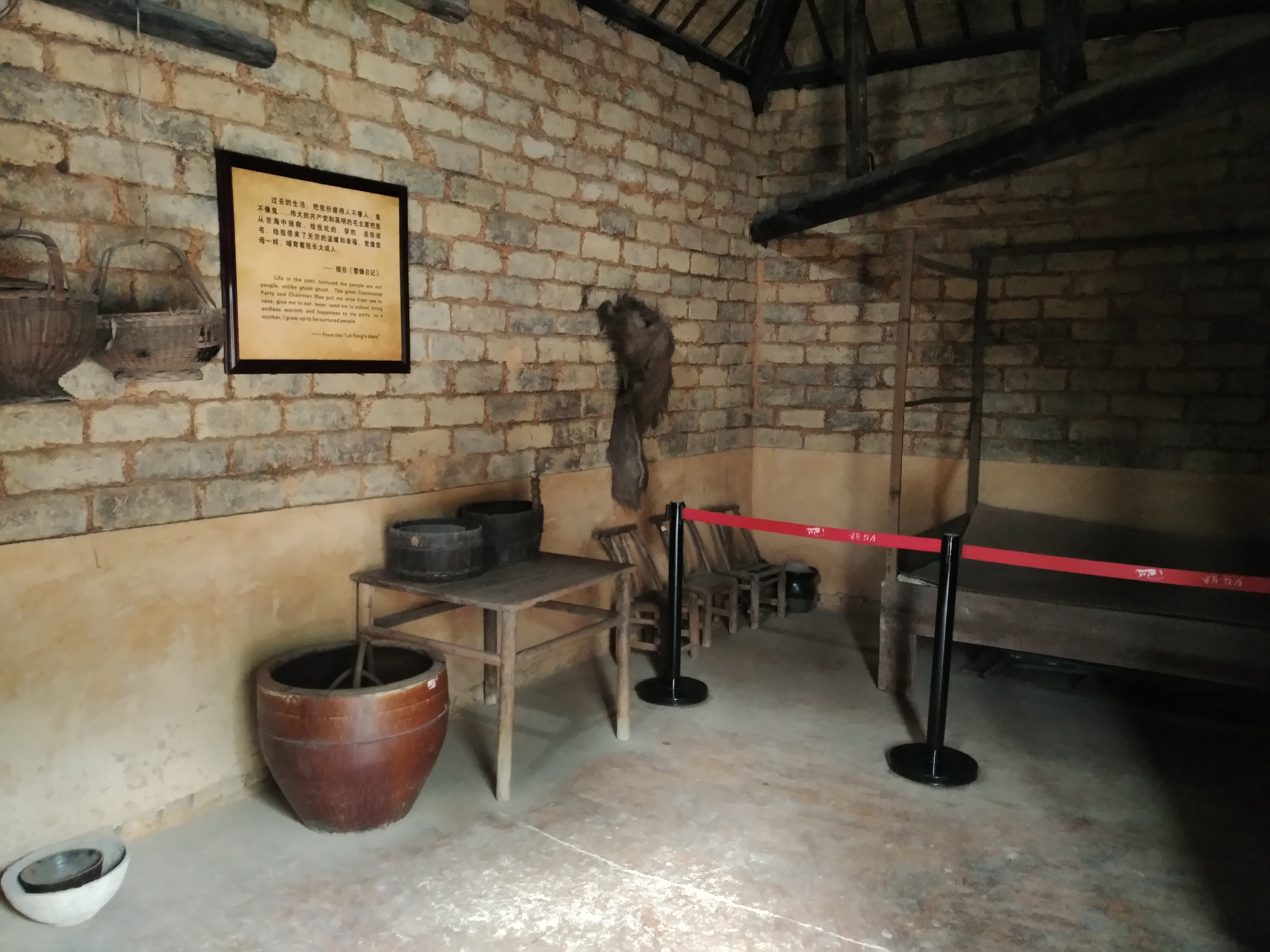
Kitchen

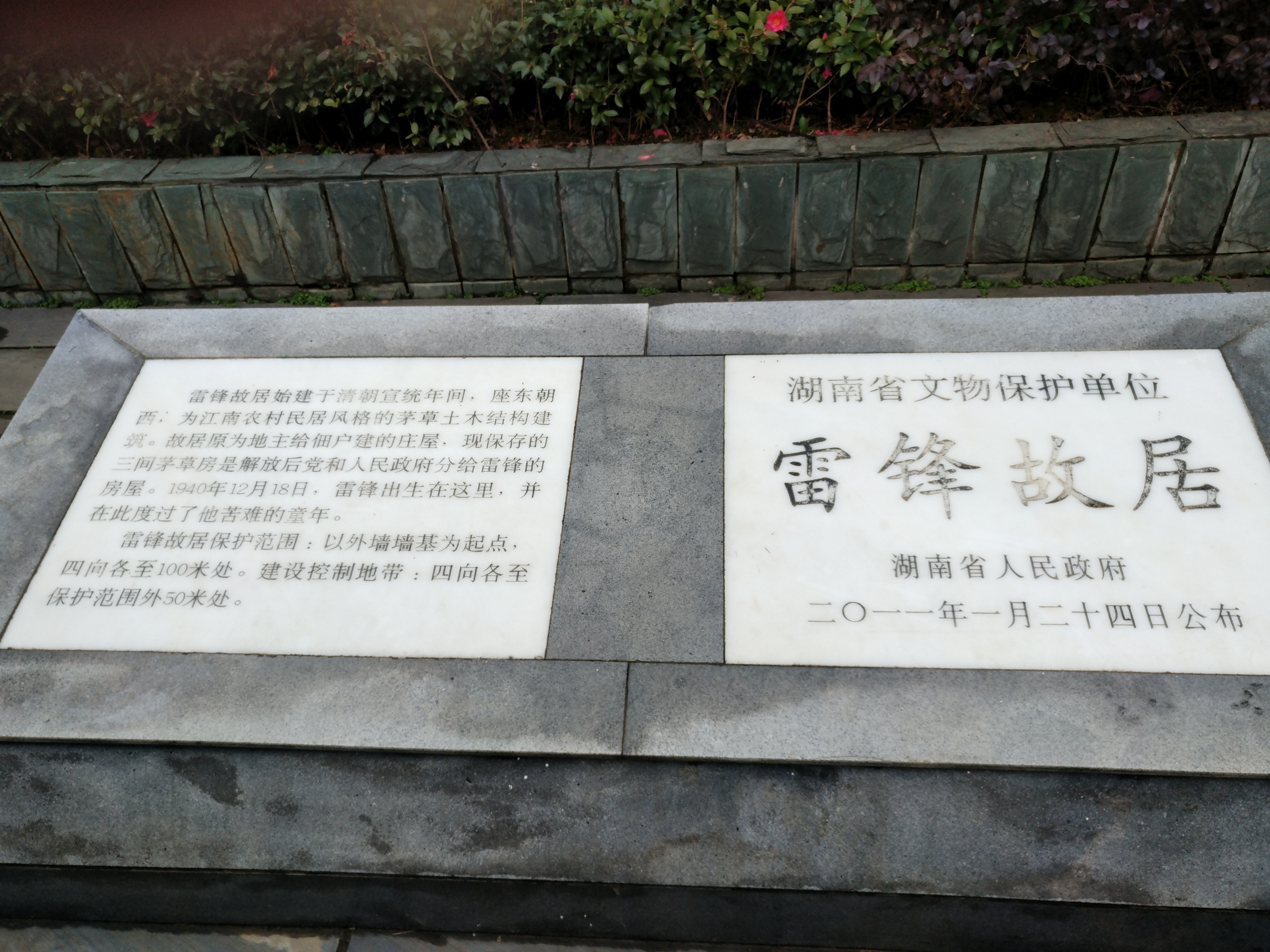
Hunan Province Cultural Relics Protection Unit signage
