= Heimi Peak =

Mountain in Hunan, China

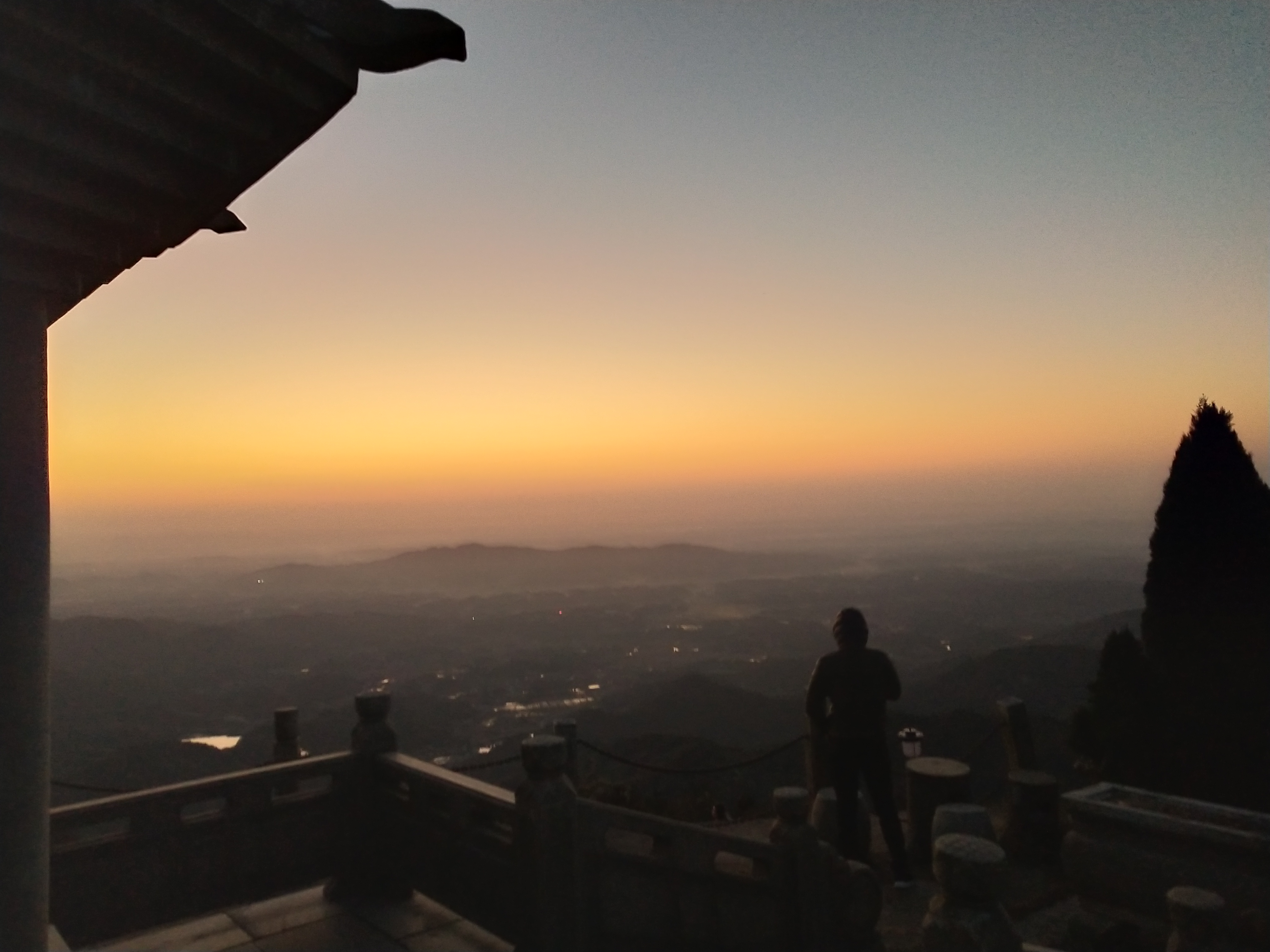
- Heimi Peak

Highest point
- Elevation: 590.5-metre (1,937 ft)
- Coordinates: 28°27′34.97″N 113°00′52.51″E

Naming
- Native name: 黑麋峰 (Chinese)

Geography
- Location within Hunan
- Location: Wangcheng District, Changsha, Hunan, China

Heimi Peak (Chinese: 黑麋峰; pinyin: Hēimí Fēng) is a mountain on the border of Wangcheng District, Changsha County, Kaifu District and Miluo City in Hunan, China. Its peak elevation is 590.5-metre (1,937 ft).

== History ==
It has been designated as a provincial forest park in May 2000 and a national forest park in 2011.

In June 2016 it was categorized as an AAAA level tourist site by the China National Tourism Administration.

== Geography ==
Heimi Peak is protected within Heimi Peak National Forest Park (Chinese: 黑麋峰国家森林公园).

=== Reservoir ===
Heimi Peak Reservoir (Chinese: 黑麋峰水库) is a medium-sized reservoir located on mountainside of Heimi Peak.

== Temple ==
The Heimi Peak Temple (Chinese: 黑麋峰寺) is a Buddhist temple on the top of Heimi Peak.

== Public Access ==
Trails are available for hiking, biking and mountaineering.

== Gallery ==
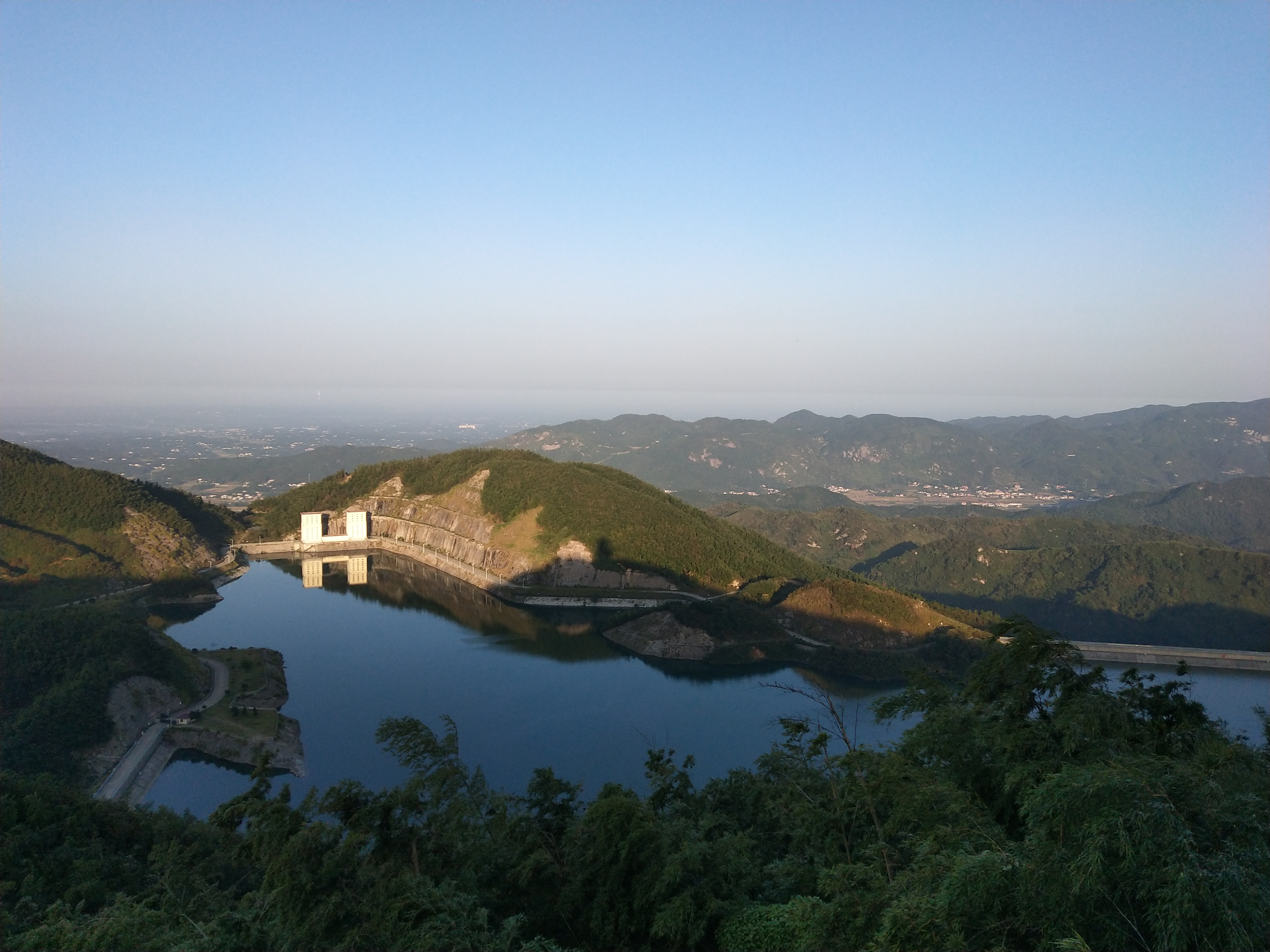
Heimi Peak Reservoir.

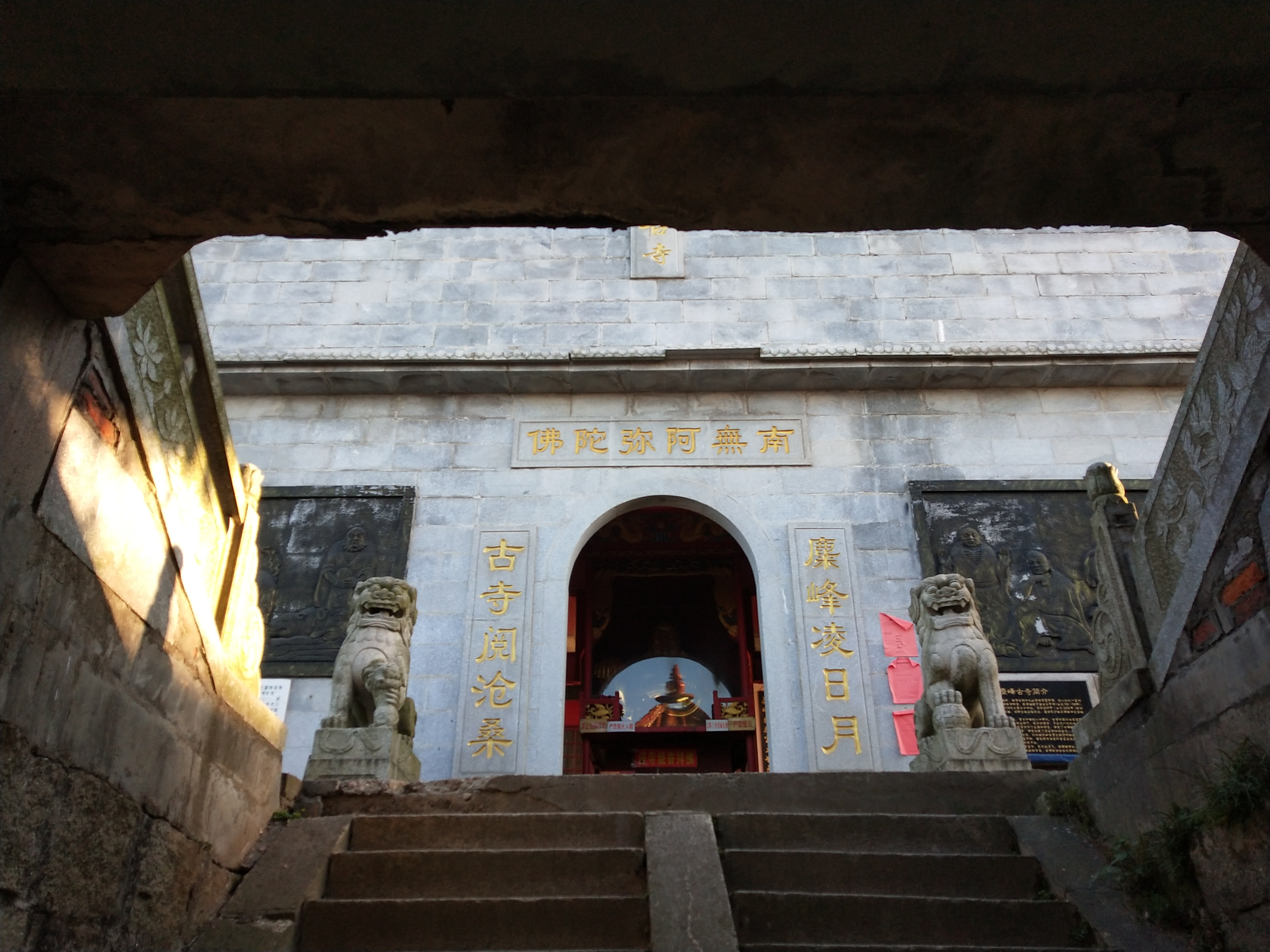
Heimi Peak Temple.

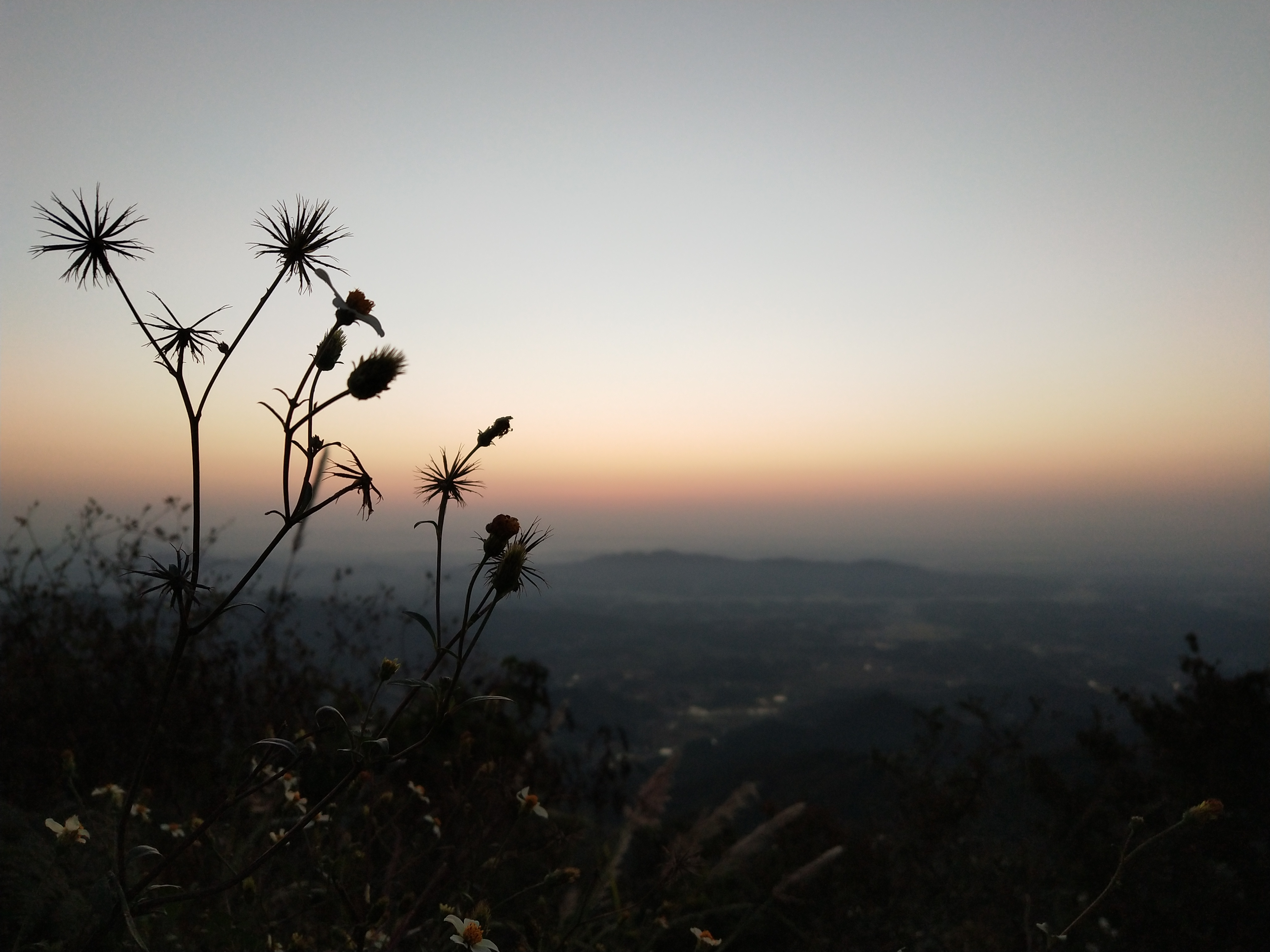
Viewed from the top of Heimi Peak, the sunrise was indeed a spectacle.
