= Qingzhuhu =

Qingzhuhu 青竹湖街道
- Subdistrict
- Interactive map of Qingzhuhu
- Country: People's Republic of China
- Province: Hunan
- Prefecture-level city: Changsha
- District: Kaifu

Area
  - Total: 41 km^{2} (16 sq mi)

Population
  - Total: 42,000
  - Density: 1,000/km^{2} (2,700/sq mi)
- 2016

Qingzhuhu (Chinese: 青竹湖街道; pinyin: Qīngzhúhú jiēdào) is a subdistrict of Kaifu District, Changsha, Hunan, China. Located on the east bank of Xiang River, Qingzhuhu is bordered by Dingziwan Subdistrict of Wangcheng District and Beishan Town of Changsha County to the north, Shaping Subdistrict to the east, Xiufeng Subdistrict to the south, Baishazhou and Dazehu Subdistricts across the Xiang river to the west. It covers about 41 km^{2} (16 sq mi) with a population of roughly 42,000 (as of 2016). The subdistrict contains 11 communities, with its administrative center at Qiaotouyi.
