= Dazehu =

Dazehu Subdistrict 大泽湖街道
- Subdistrict
- Interactive map of Dazehu Subdistrict
- Country: People's Republic of China
- Province: Hunan
- Prefecture-level city: Changsha
- District: Wangcheng

Area
  - Total: 25.33 km^{2} (9.78 sq mi)

Population (2013)
  - Total: 26,400
  - Density: 1,040/km^{2} (2,700/sq mi)
- Time zone: UTC+8 (China Standard)

Dazehu (simplified Chinese: 大泽湖街道; traditional Chinese: 大澤湖街道; pinyin: Dàzéhú Jiēdào) is a subdistrict of Wangcheng District, Changsha, Hunan, China. It is located on the western bank of the Xiang River. The subdistrict is bordered by the Yueliangdao Subdistrict to the South, Huangjinyuan to the West, Baishazhou, the Gaotangling Subdistricts to the North, and Dingziwan across the Xiang River to the East. Dazehu has an area of 25.33 km^{2} (9.78 sq mi) and has a population of 26,400. The subdistrict has one residential community and three villages under its jurisdiction.

== History ==
Dazehu was formed by the revocation of Xingcheng and the establishment of three new subdistricts in 2012. Xingcheng (星城镇) was formed by Dahu (大湖乡) and Gushan (谷山乡) in 1995. In 1997, it had 22 villages and two residential communities.

In July 2012, Xingcheng was reclassified from a town to a subdistrict. On August 28, 2012, Xingcheng was divided into three subdistricts: Baishazhou (白沙洲街道), Dazehu (大泽湖街道) and Yueliangdao (月亮岛街道).

- The Dazehu subdistrict contains Dongma residential community (东马社区), Xitang (西塘村), Huilong (回龙村) and Nantang (南塘村) villages.
- The Baishazhou Subdistrict contains Maqiaohe (马桥河村), Tengfei (腾飞村) and huangtian (黄田村) three villages.
- The Yueliangdao Subdistrict contains the Yueliangdao Residential Community (月亮岛社区), Yinxing (银星村), Zhonghualing (中华岭村) and Daigongmiao (戴公庙村) villages.
