= Dingziwan =

Coordinates: 28.3745°N 112.8977°E

Dingziwan subdistrict 丁字湾街道
- Subdistrict
- Interactive map of Dingziwan subdistrict
- Country: People's Republic of China
- Province: Hunan
- Prefecture-level city: Changsha
- District: Wangcheng

Area
  - Total: 39.89 km^{2} (15.40 sq mi)

Population
  - Total: 31,000
  - Density: 780/km^{2} (2,000/sq mi)
- 2012

Dingziwan (simplified Chinese: 丁字湾街道; traditional Chinese: 丁字灣街道; pinyin: Dīngzìwān Jiēdào) is a subdistrict of the Wangcheng district, Changsha, Hunan, China, located on the eastern bank of the Xiang River. The subdistrict is bordered by the Tongguan Subdistrict to the north; the town of Qiaoyi to the east; the Qingzhuhu subdistrict of the Kaifu district to the south; and the Gaotangling, Baishazhou, and Dazehu subdistricts across the Xiang River to the west.

== History ==
The Xianing sub-division (霞凝区) was a controlled district of Wangcheng county (县辖区), which was created by merging various townships and villages. In June 1995, the Dingzi township (丁字乡) and Shutang township (书堂乡) were merged into Dingzi town (丁字镇). In May 2012, Dingzi town was renamed as Dingzi subdistrict (丁字街道). It had an area of 89.39 km^{2} (34.51 sq mi) with eight villages, two residential communities, and a population of 58,800 people under its jurisdiction.

In August 2012, the Dingzi subdistrict was divided into the subdistricts of Dingziwan (丁字湾街道) and Shutangshan (书堂山街道). The Dingziwan subdistrict has an area of 39.89 km^{2} (15.40 sq mi) containing two residential communities and three villages, with a total population of about 31,000 people. The Shutangshan subdistrict had an area of 49.50 km^{2} (19.11 sq mi) with five villages under its jurisdiction (Shutangshan [书堂山], Heqiao [何桥], Shizhuhu [石渚湖], Zhongshan [中山] and Caitaoyuan [彩陶源]) and a population of about 31,000 people, before being merged with the Tongguan subdistrict on November 19, 2015.
