= Yueliangdao =

Yueliangdao subdistrict 月亮岛街道
- Subdistrict
- Interactive map of Yueliangdao subdistrict
- Country: People's Republic of China
- Province: Hunan
- Prefecture-level city: Changsha
- District: Wangcheng

Area
  - Total: 22.77 km^{2} (8.79 sq mi)

Population (2013)
  - Total: 30,061
  - Density: 1,320/km^{2} (3,419/sq mi)
- Time zone: UTC+8 (China Standard)

Yueliangdao (simplified Chinese: 月亮岛街道; traditional Chinese: 月亮島街道; pinyin: Yuèliàngdǎo Jiēdào) is a subdistrict of Wangcheng district, Changsha, Hunan, China. It is located on the western bank of Xiang river. The subdistrict is bordered by Dazehu subdistrict to the north, Huangjinyuan to the west, Wangyue and Guanshaling subdistricts of Yuelu district to the south, Xiufeng subdistrict across the Xiang river to the east. Yueliangdao has an area of 22.77 km^{2} (8.79 sq mi) with a population of 30,061. The subdistrict has four residential communities and three villages under its jurisdiction.

== History ==
Yueliangdao was formed by the revocation of Xingcheng (and setting up three new subdistricts) in 2012. Xingcheng (星城镇) was formed by Dahu (大湖乡) and Gushan (谷山乡) in 1995. There were 22 villages and two residential communities in 1997.

In July 2012, Xingcheng was changed from a town as a subdistrict. On August 28, 2012, Xingcheng was divided into three subdistricts, they are Baishazhou (白沙洲街道), Dazehu (大泽湖街道) and Yueliangdao (月亮岛街道) subdistricts.

- The Yueliangdao contains Yueliangdao residential community (月亮岛社区), Yinxing (银星村), Zhonghualing (中华岭村) and Daigongmiao (戴公庙村) villages;
- The Dazehu subdistrict contains Dongma residential community (东马社区), Xitang (西塘村), Huilong (回龙村) and Nantang (南塘村) villages;
- The Baishazhou subdistrict contains Maqiaohe (马桥河村), Tengfei (腾飞村) and huangtian (黄田村) three villages.
