= Bairuopu =

Bairuopu town 白箬铺镇
- Town
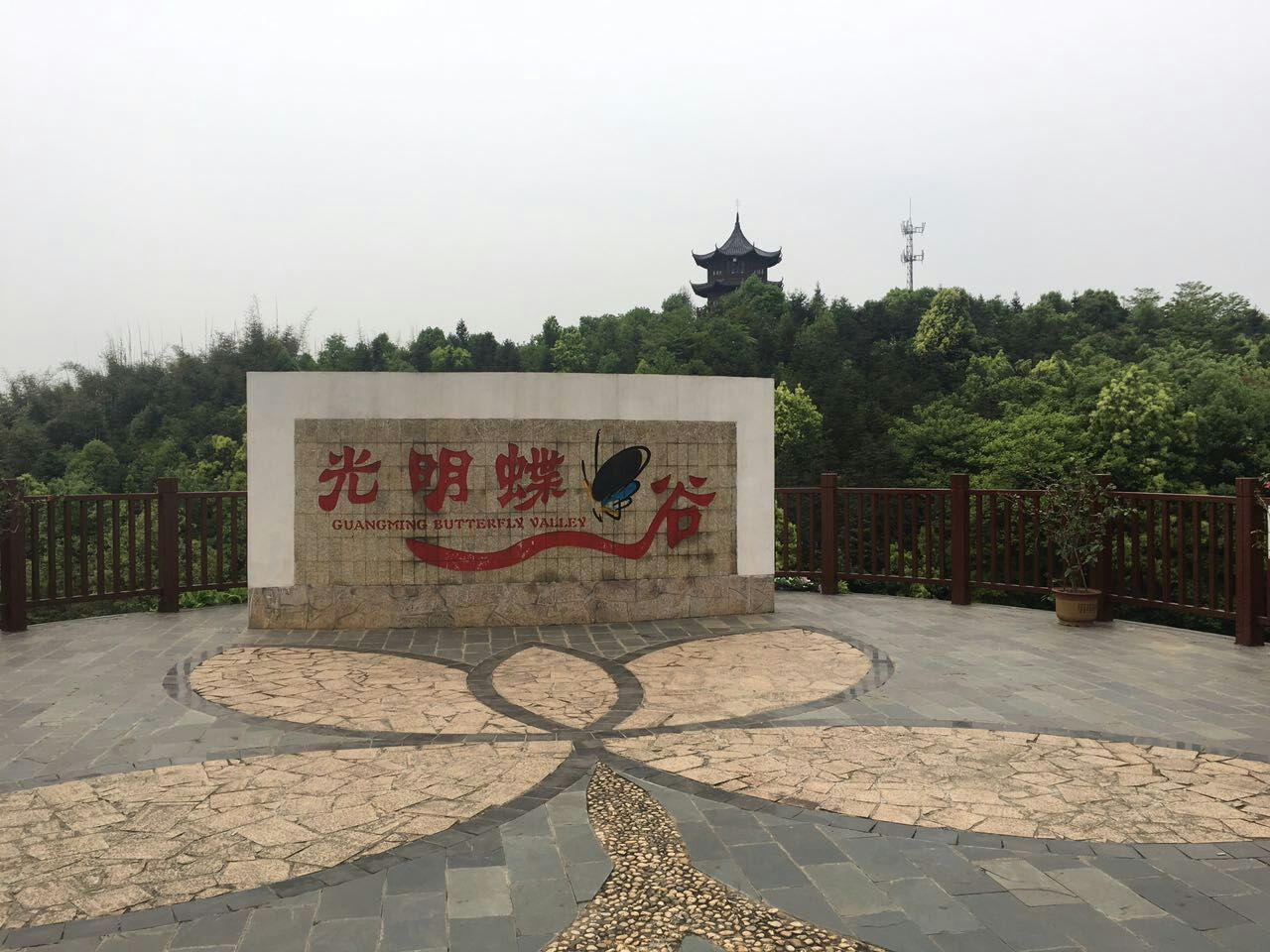
- Guangming Butterfly Valley in Bairuopu Town.

- Location in Hunan
- Coordinates: 28°28′42″N 112°48′17″E
- Country: People's Republic of China
- Province: Hunan
- Prefecture-level city: Changsha
- District: Wangcheng

Area
  - Total: 106 km^{2} (41 sq mi)

Population
  - Total: 42,466
  - Density: 401/km^{2} (1,040/sq mi)
- 2013
- Website: http://brpz.wangcheng.gov.cn/

Bairuopu (simplified Chinese: 白箬铺镇; traditional Chinese: 白箬鋪鎮; pinyin: Báiruòpū Zhèn) is a town in Wangcheng district, Changsha, Hunan, China. the town is located on the southwest of the district, and bordered by Jinzhou town of Ningxiang and Wushan Subdistrict to the north, Leifeng Subdistrict to the east, Yucangping and Lianhua towns to the south, Xiaduopu town of Ningxiang to the west. It covers 106 km^{2} (41 sq mi) with a population of 42,466. The village-level divisions were adjusted from 15 into 11 ones on March 23, 2016; there are 10 villages and one residential community under its jurisdiction. Its administrative centre is at Wulidui (五里堆).

== Subdivisions ==
There were 14 villages and a residential community in 2015. According to the result on adjustment of the divisions of Bairuopu on March 23, 2016, the village-level divisions were adjusted from 15 into 11 ones; there are one residential community and 10 villages under its jurisdiction.

Administrative divisions of Bairuopu after adjustment on March 23, 2016
villages and residential communities		villages	
English	Chinese	English	Chinese
Bairuopu residential community reformed by merging Bairupu village and Bairupu downtown residential community	白箬铺社区; 2016年3月23日由原白箬铺村、白箬铺集镇社区合并设置	Gushan village formed by merging Gucun and Hongshan villages	古山村; 2016年3月23日由古村村、洪山村合并设置
Jinsi village reformed by merging the former Jinsi and Jinfeng 2 villages on March 23, 2016	金峙村; 2016年3月23日由原金峙村、金峰村合并设置	Shuyi village formed by merging Taolin and Jinliang 2 villages on March 23, 2016	淑一村; 2016年3月23日由桃林村、金良村合并设置
Huangnipu village	黄泥铺村	Longlian village	龙莲村
Datang village	大塘村	Guangming village	光明村
Longtang village	龙唐村	Qitianmiao village	齐天庙村
Shenghe village	胜和村		

== Gallery ==
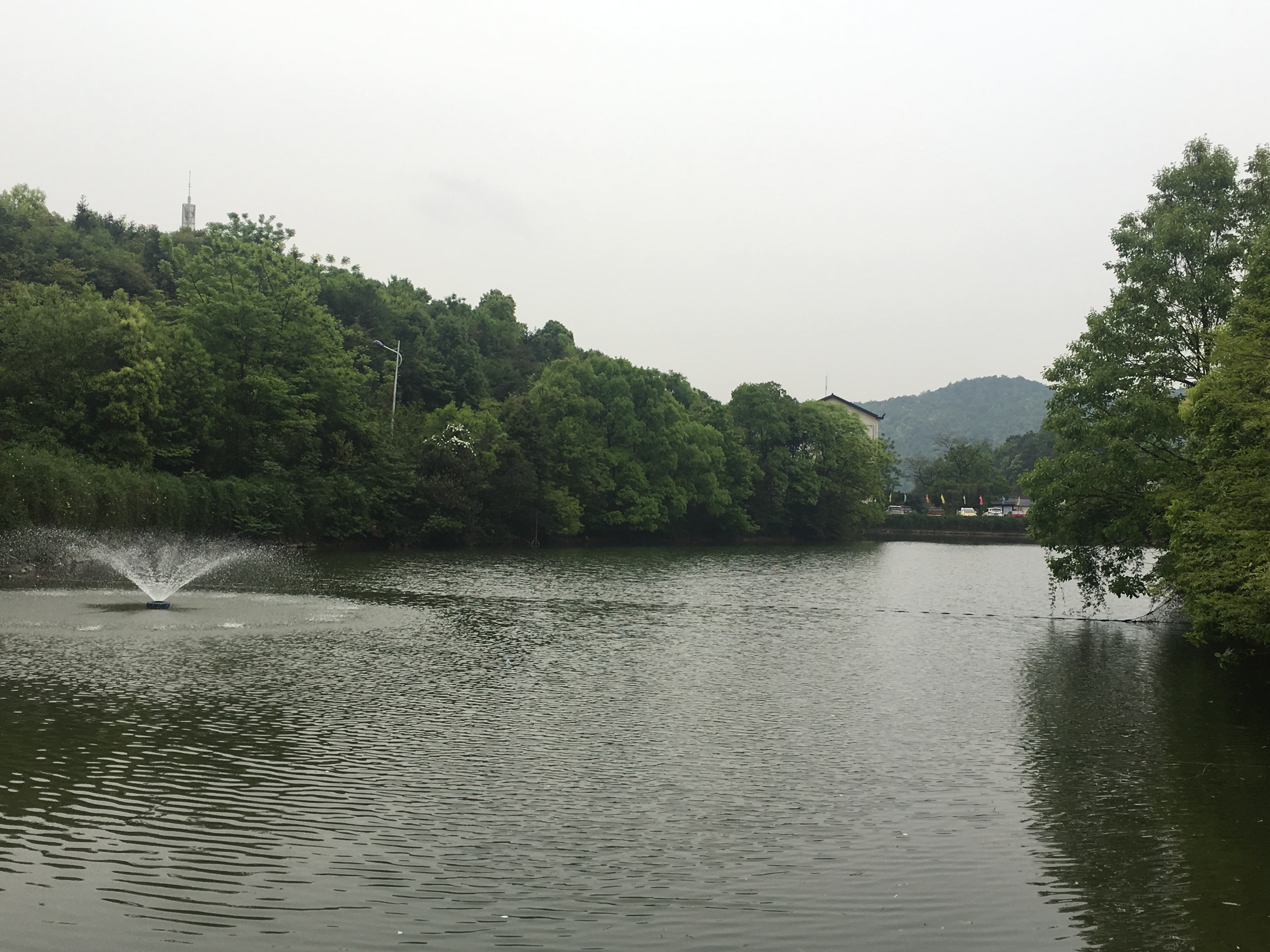
A pond in Guangming Butterfly Valley of Guangming Village.

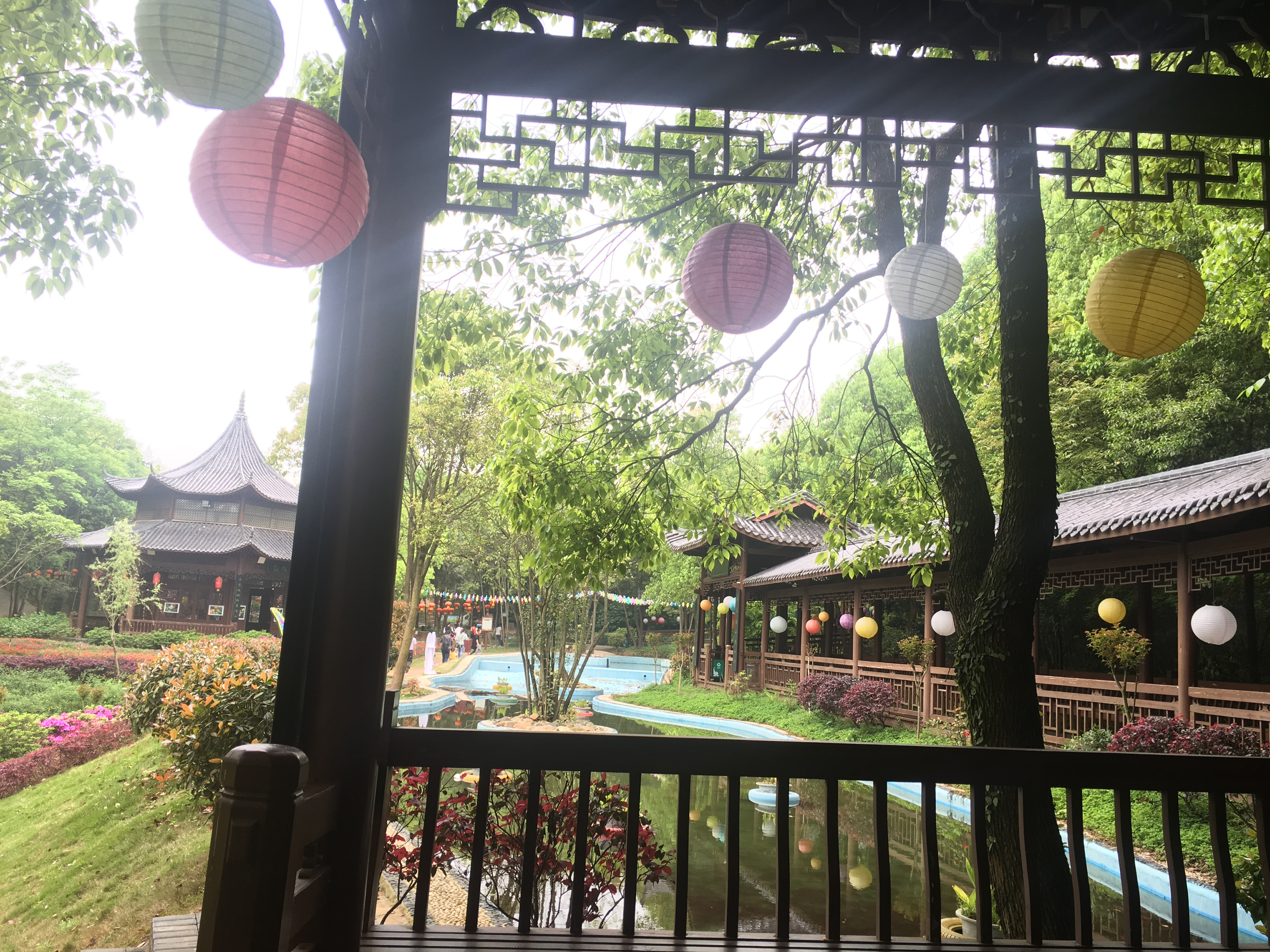
Corridor in Guangming Butterfly Valley of Guangming Village.

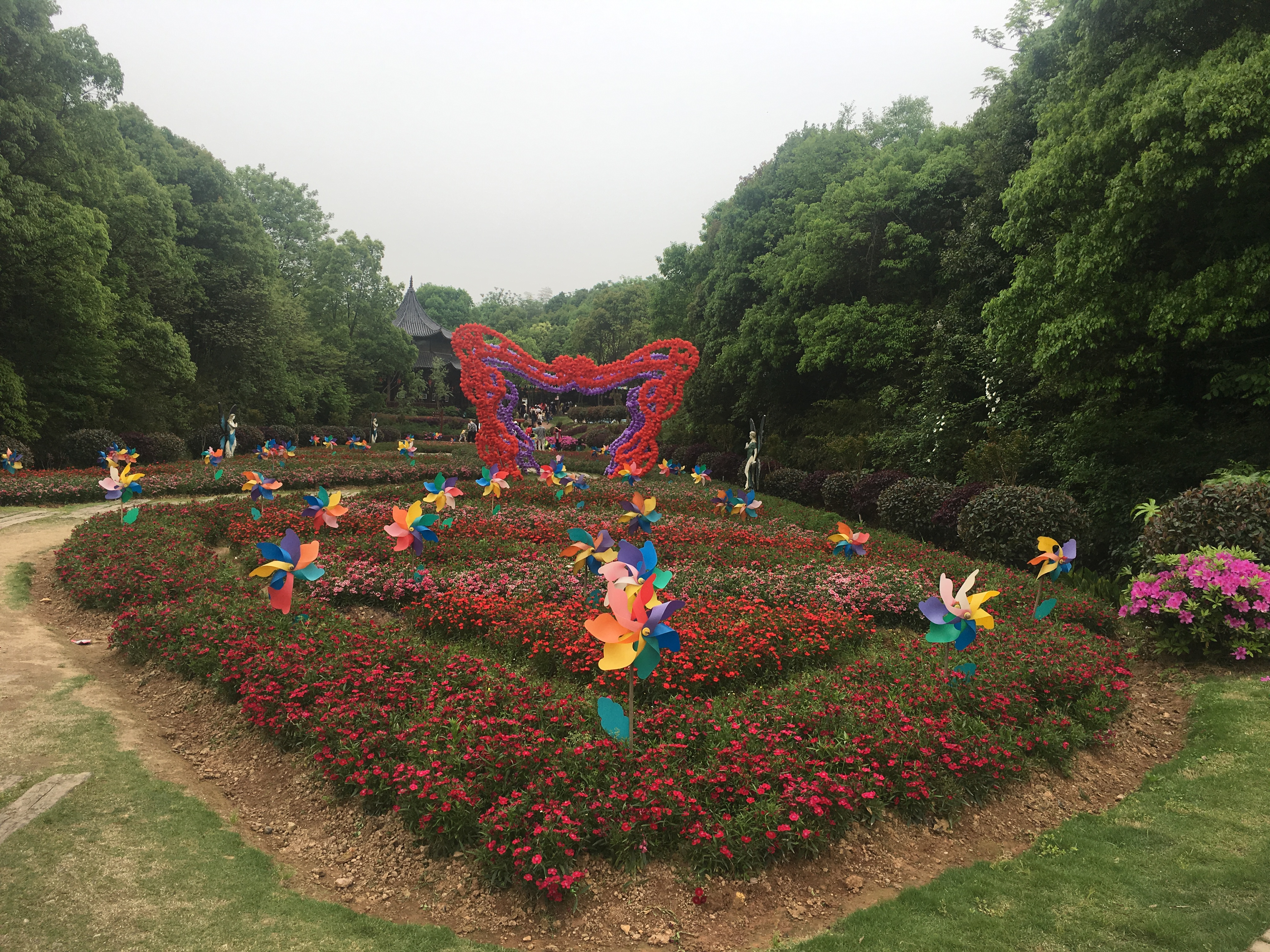
Guangming Butterfly Valley.

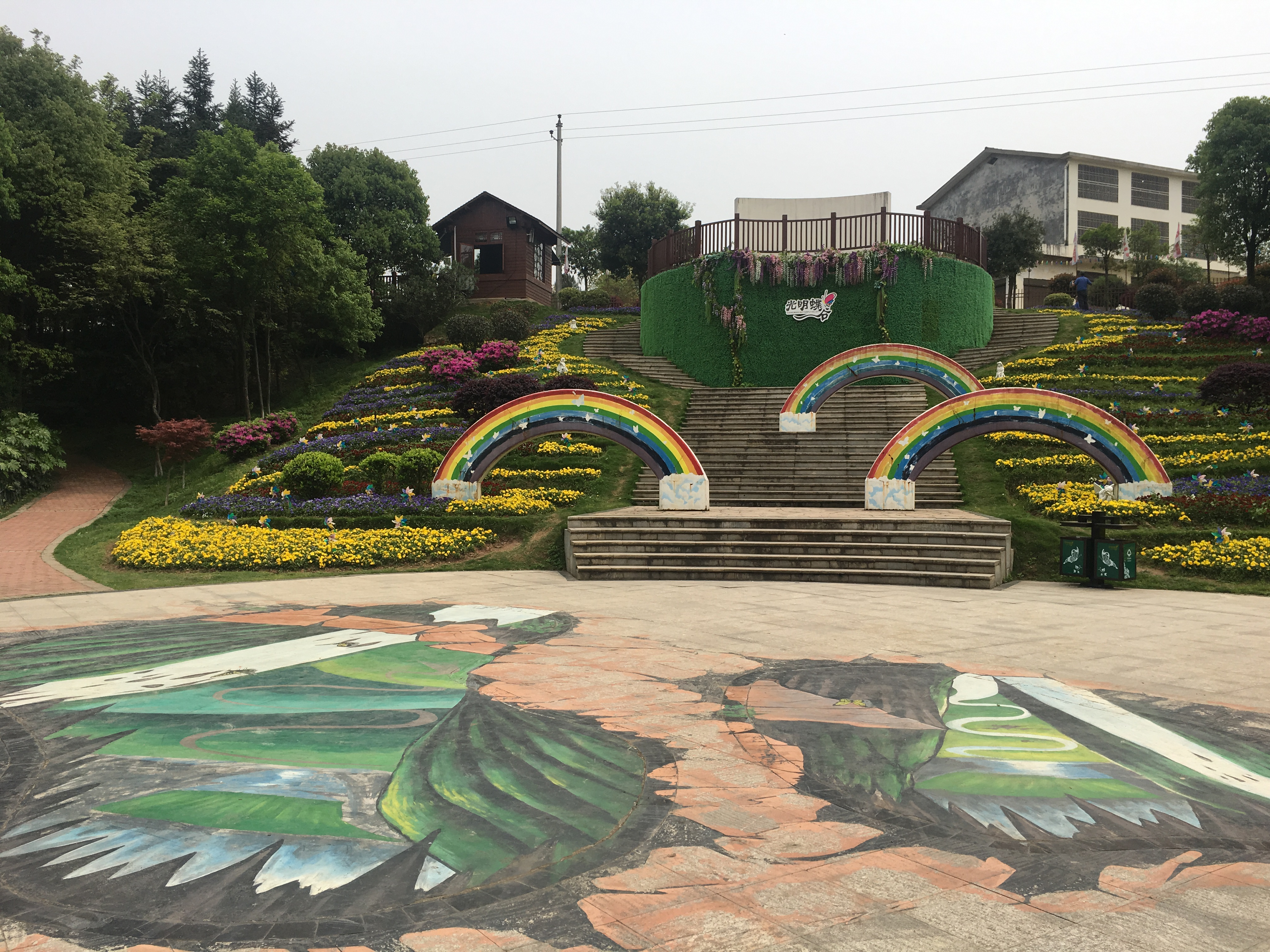
Guangming Butterfly Valley.

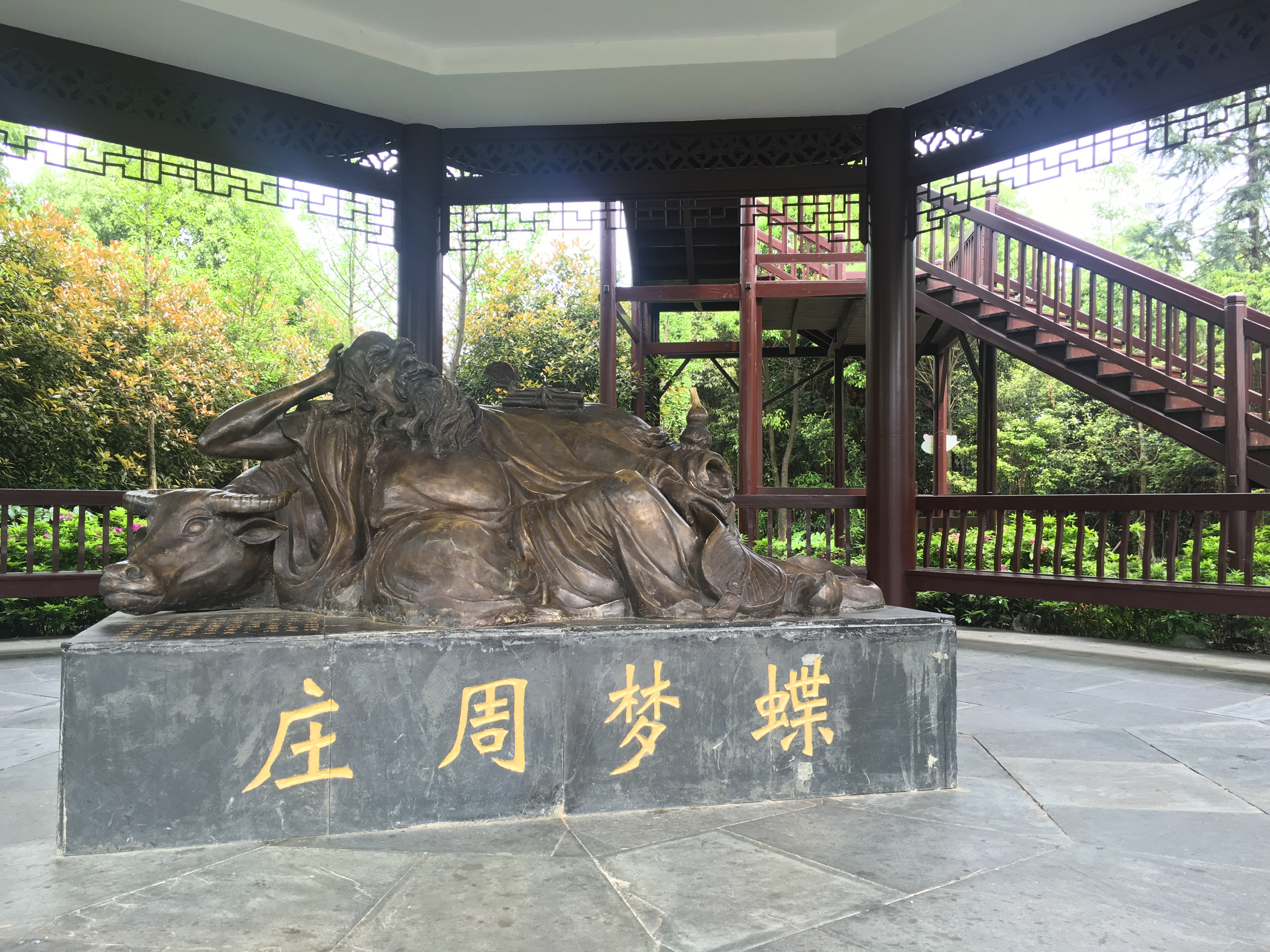
Statue of Zhuangzi in Guangming Butterfly Valley.

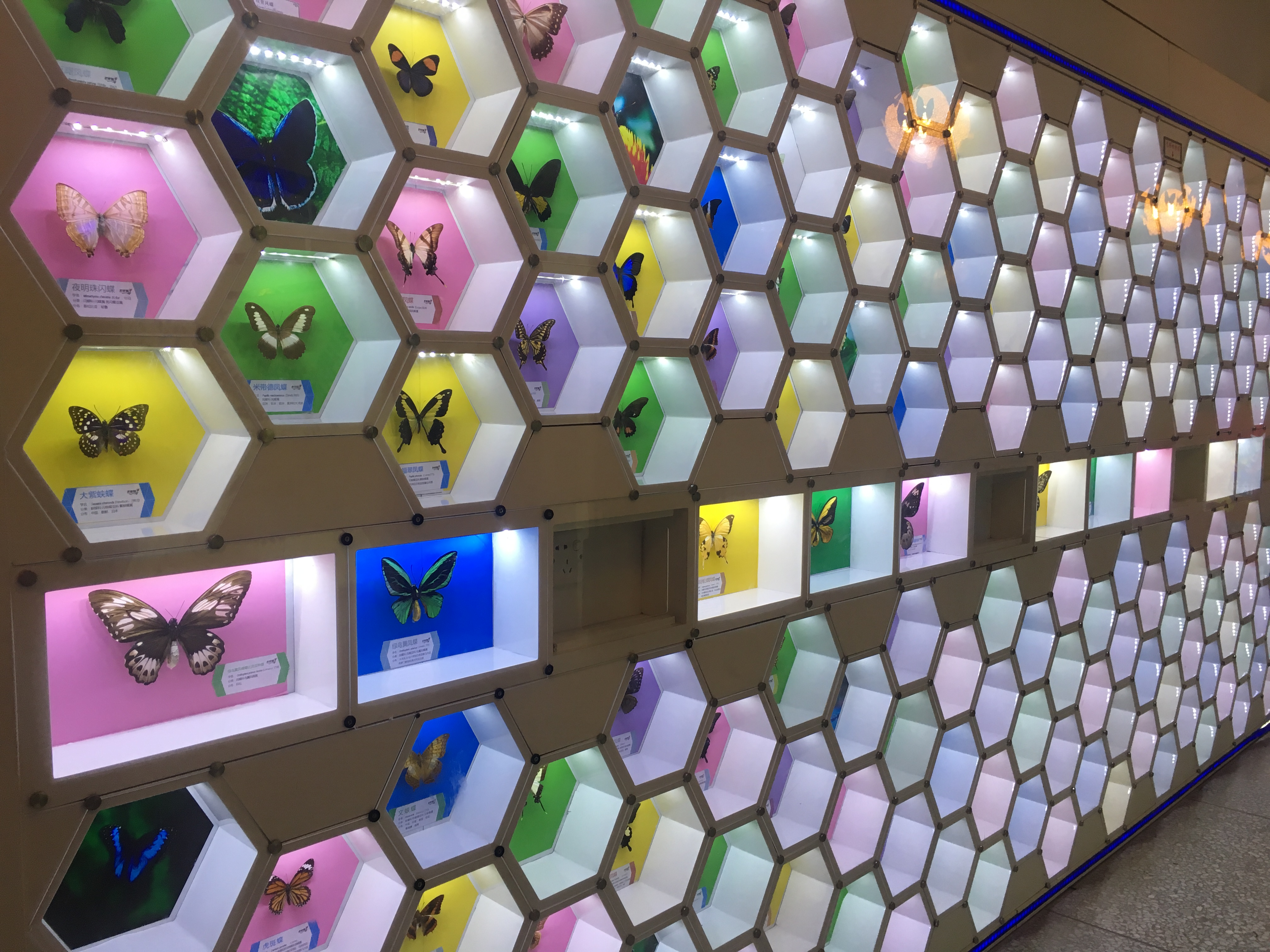
Butterfly specimen exhibition in Guangming Butterfly Valley.

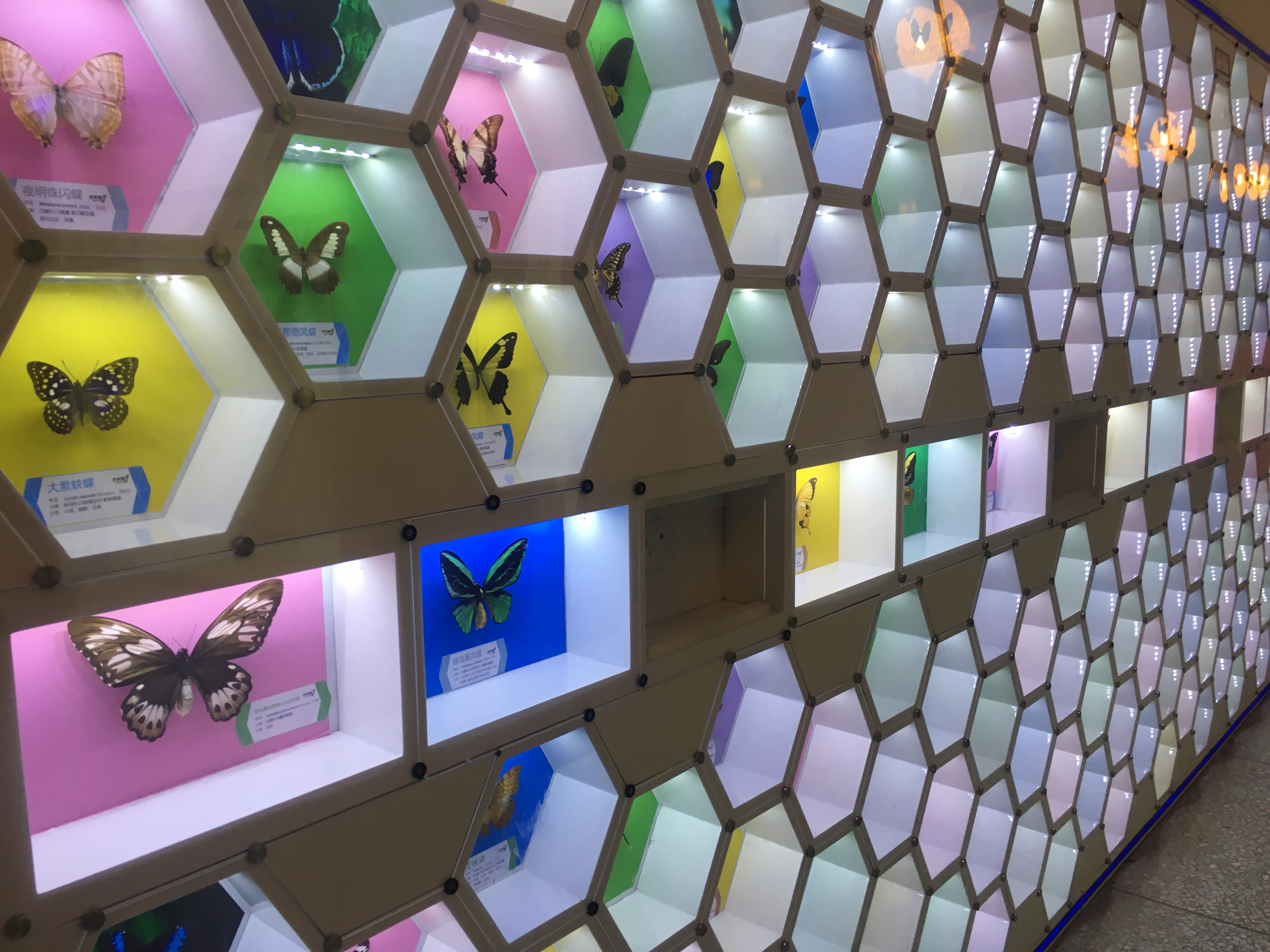
Butterfly specimen exhibition in Guangming Butterfly Valley.

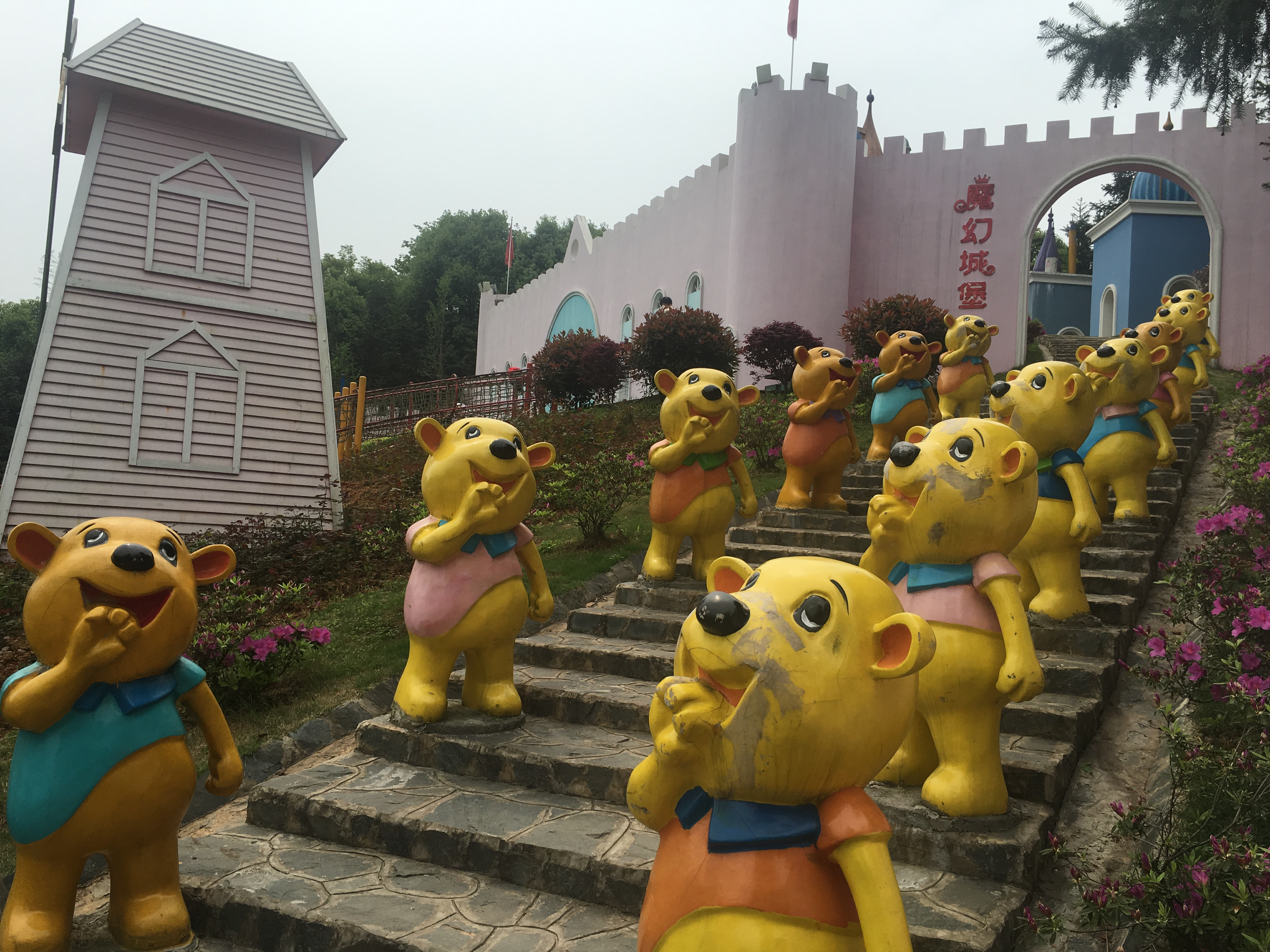
The Howl's Moving Castle in Guangming Butterfly Valley.
