= Shahe Town =

Shahe could refer to the following towns in China:

== Written as "沙河镇" ==
=== Anhui ===
- Shahe, Chuzhou

=== Gansu ===
- Shahe, Linze County

=== Guangxi ===
- Shahe, Bobai County

=== Jiangsu ===
- Shahe, Ganyu County

=== Jiangxi ===
- Shahe, Ganzhou

=== Jilin ===
- Shahe, Dongfeng County

=== Liaoning ===
- Shahe, Anshan
- Shahe, Suizhong County

=== Shandong ===
- Shahe, Laizhou

=== Shaanxi ===
- Shahe, Xixiang County

=== Sichuan ===
- Shahe, Gao County
- Shahe, Guangyuan
- Shahe, Nanjiang County

== Other written forms ==
- Shahe, Fanshi County, Shanxi (砂河镇)
