= Huangjinyuan =

Coordinates: 29°42′N 113°34′E

Huangjinyuan Subdistrict 黄金园街道
- Subdistrict
- Interactive map of Huangjinyuan Subdistrict
- Country: People's Republic of China
- Province: Hunan
- Prefecture-level city: Changsha
- District: Wangcheng

Area
  - Total: 27.57 km^{2} (10.64 sq mi)

Population (2013)
  - Total: 15,000
  - Density: 540/km^{2} (1,400/sq mi)
- Time zone: UTC+8 (China Standard)

Huangjinyuan (simplified Chinese: 黄金园街道; traditional Chinese: 黃金園街道; pinyin: Huángjīnyuán Jiēdào) is a subdistrict of Wangcheng District, Changsha, Hunan, China. It is located on the center of West Wangcheng, the subdistrict is bordered by Gaotangling and Wushan Subdistricts to the north, Bairuopu town to the west, Leifeng Subdistrict to the south, Baishazhou subdistrict to the east. Huangjinyuan has an area of 27.57 km^{2} (10.64 sq mi) with a population of 15,000. The subdistrict has three villages under its jurisdiction.

== History ==
Huangjinyuan was formed by the revocation of Huangjin (and setting up three new subdistricts) in 2012.

In June 2012, Huangjin was changed from a town as a subdistrict. On August 28, 2012, Huangjin was divided into three subdistricts, they are Jinshanqiao (金山桥街道), Huangjinyuan (黄金园街道) and Liaojiaping (廖家坪街道) subdistricts.

- The Huangjinyuan subdistrict contains Guifang (桂芳村), Huangjinyuan (黄金园村) and Yingxiongling (英雄岭村) three villages.
- The Jinshanqiao subdistrict contains Jinping (金坪社区), Jinshanqiao (金山桥社区) and Tonglin'ao (桐林坳社区) three residential communities.
- The Liaojiaping subdistrict contains Baima (白马村), Liaojiaping (廖家坪村) and Sanyi (三益村) three villages. Liaojiaping was merged to Leifeng subdistrict on November 19, 2015.
