= Shahe Subdistrict =

Shahe Subdistrict (沙河街道) could refer to the following subdistricts in China:

- Shahe Subdistrict, Chongqing, in Wanzhou District, Chongqing
- Shahe Subdistrict, Guangzhou, in Tianhe District, Guangzhou, Guangdong
- Shahe Subdistrict, Shenzhen, in Nanshan District, Shenzhen, Guangdong
- Shahe Subdistrict, Baotou, in Jiuyuan District, Baotou, Inner Mongolia
- Shahe Subdistrict, Anshan, Liaoning, in Lishan District, Anshan, Liaoning
- Shahe Subdistrict, Binzhou, in Bincheng District, Binzhou, Shandong
- Shahe Subdistrict, Chengdu, in Jinjiang District, Chengdu, Sichuan
