= Shahe, Gao County =

Shahe 沙河
- Town
- 沙河镇
- Location within Sichuan province
- Coordinates: 28°33′45″N 104°45′06″E
- Country: People's Republic of China
- Province: Sichuan
- Prefecture-level city: Yibin
- County: Gao
- Time zone: UTC+8 (China Standard Time)
- Postal Code: 551525

Shahe (Chinese: 沙河; pinyin: Shāhé) is a town in the northeast of Gao County, southeastern Sichuan Province in Southwest China, located 30 kilometres (19 mi) southeast of the city of Yibin. In 2009, it administered 26 villages. It is the home of Shahe tofu (沙河豆腐), one of the better known food products of Southern Sichuan that is also tender and features brilliant colours and Shahe Salted Duck (沙河板鸭).

== See also ==
- List of township-level divisions of Sichuan
