= Leifeng Subdistrict =

Leifeng 雷锋街道
- Subdistrict
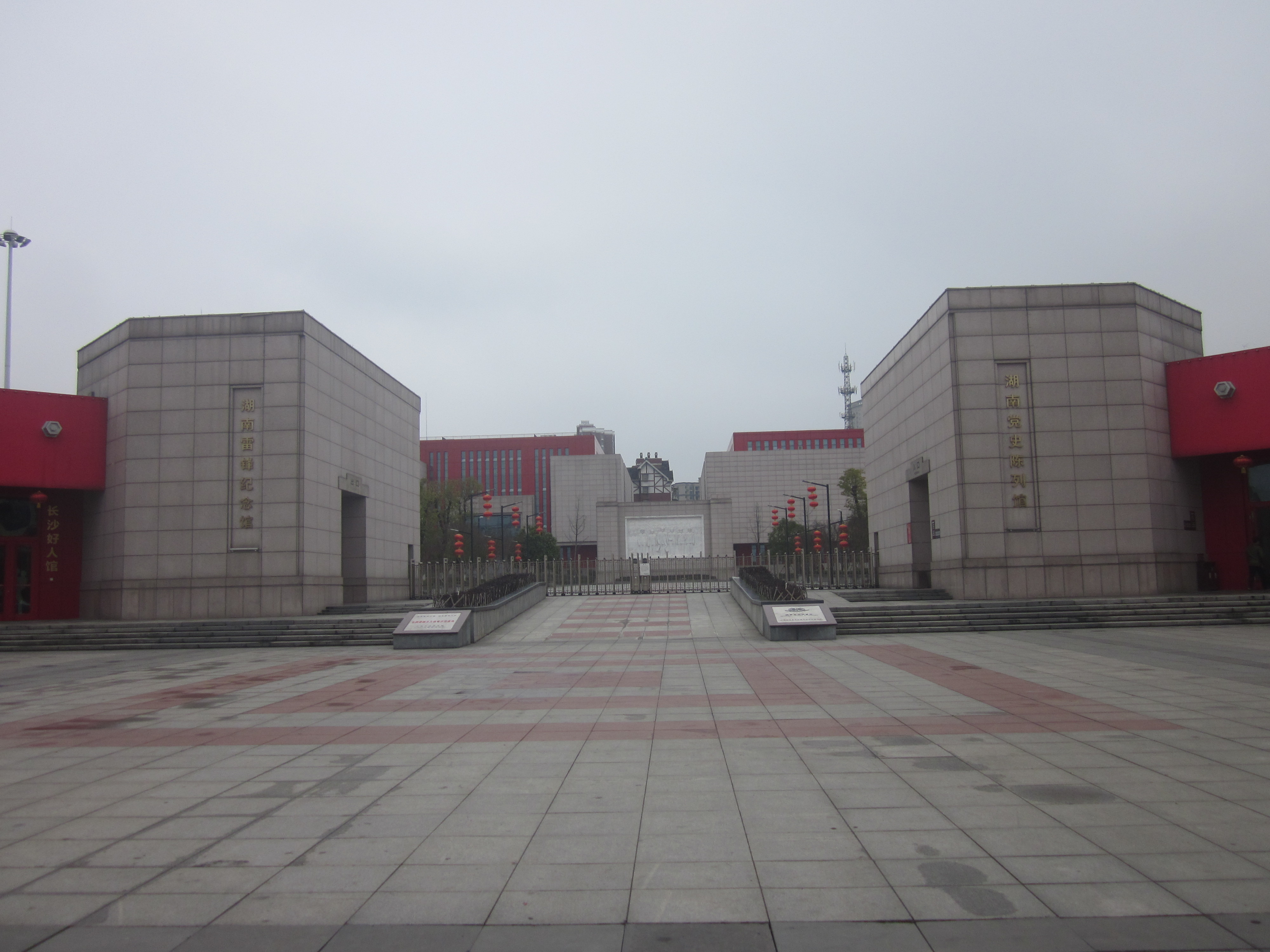
- Entrance of Lei Feng Memorial and Party History Museum of the CPC Hunan Provincial Committee in Leifeng Subdistrict.

- Location in Hunan
- Coordinates: 28°12′07″N 112°50′49″E
- Country: People's Republic of China
- Province: Hunan
- City: Changsha
- District: Wangcheng District
- Established: 1958
- Named for: Lei Feng
- Seat: Huánghuātáng

Area
  - Total: 62 km^{2} (24 sq mi)

Population (2002)
  - Total: 28,014
  - Density: 450/km^{2} (1,200/sq mi)
- Time zone: UTC+8 (China Standard)
- Website: http://www.wangcheng.gov.cn/sites/site74/index.jsp

Leifeng (simplified Chinese: 雷锋街道; traditional Chinese: 雷鋒街道; pinyin: Léifēng Jiēdào) is a subdistrict of Wangcheng District in Changsha City, Hunan Province, China. Leifeng's area is 82.4 km^{2} (31.8 square miles) and its population is about 43,000 (as of 2016). It is named after Chinese hero Lei Feng, who was supposedly born there.

== History ==
Leifeng was a portion of Wangyue (望岳乡) and Bairuopu (白箬铺镇) townships in 1949, Anqing township (安庆乡) was formed in 1950. Huanghuatang commune was formed in 1968, it was renamed as Huanghuatang township in 1984. On March 16, 1993, Huanghuatang township was renamed Leifeng town.

=== Liaojiaping subdistrict ===
Liaojiaping (廖家坪街道) was a subdistrict formed from a portion of Huangjin (黄金街道) On August 28, 2012. It covered 22.16 km^{2} (8.56 sq mi) with a population of 10,269 in 2012. There were three villages of Liaojiaping (廖家坪村), Baima (白马村) and Sanyi (三益村) under its jurisdiction; its administrative centre was at Sanyi. It was also merged to Leifeng on November 19, 2015.

== Subdivision ==
After merging with Liaojiaping on November 19, 2015, Leifeng contained eight villages and two residential communities. The Leifeng community was formed by the merging of Leifeng village and Runyuan residential community (润园社区) on March 23, 2016. The Leifeng subdistrict has two residential communities and seven villages under its jurisdiction.

Administrative divisions of Leifeng subdistrict in 2016
The administrative centre of the subdistrict is at Huanghuatang; the following list is according to the result of adjustment on village-level divisions on March 23, 2016; Leifeng has seven villages and two residential communities under its jurisdiction.
villages and residential communities		villages	
English name	Chinese name	English name	Chinese name
Hehuatang residential community	荷花塘社区	Zhenrenqiao village	真人桥村
Leifeng residential community formed by merging Leifeng village and Runyuan residential community in March 23, 2016	雷锋社区; 2016年3月23日，由雷锋村和润园社区合并设置	Liaojiaping village	廖家坪村
Qiaotoupu village	桥头铺村	Baima village	白马村
Pailouba village	牌楼坝村	Sanyi village	三益村
Pingshan village	坪山村		

=== Subdivision of pre-Leifeng before 2015 ===
Leifeng had 15 villages and two residential communities in 2002, the villages and communities were merged into six villages and a residential community in 2003, the Heyeba village (荷叶坝村) was changed to the Dongfanghong town of Yuelu district in 2004, Leifeng had five villages and a residential community under its jurisdiction from 2004 to 2014.

- Hehuatang residential community (荷花塘社区): formed by the former Hehuatang and Longhuitang (龙回塘社区) residential communities in October 2003.
- Leifeng village (雷锋村): formed by the former Huanghuatang (黄花塘村) and Leifeng villages in October 2003.
- Qiaotoupu village (桥头铺村): formed by the former Qiaotoupu (石塘), Matou (马头村) and Shitang (石塘村) villages in October 2003.
- Pailouba village (牌楼坝村): formed by the former Pailouba, Tuizishan (推子山村) and Hexin (合心村) villages.
- Pingshan village (坪山村): formed by the former Pingshan, Ping'an (平安村) and Shuangfeng (双凤村) villages in October 2003.
- Zhenrenqiao village (真人桥村): formed by the former Zhenrenqiao, Tongxin (同心村) and Fengshu (枫树村) villages in October 2003.

== Transportation ==
China National Highway 319 and the G0401 Changsha Ring Expressway (G0401) pass through the town and an interchange with the Changzhang Expressway (G5513) is nearby. The Changsha Railway Station is 15 km away, and Changsha Huanghua International Airport is 35 km away.

== Attractions ==
Leifeng Subdistrict is the site of Lei Feng Memorial Hall (simplified Chinese: 雷锋纪念馆; traditional Chinese: 雷鋒紀念館; pinyin: Léi Fēng Jìniànguǎn). The hall was begun in 1966 and completed in November 1968. It includes 349 displays on the life and veneration of Red Chinese hero Lei Feng.

- Former Residence of Lei Feng
- Party History Museum of the CPC Hunan Provincial Committee

== Locator maps ==
- Map of Wangcheng, Changsha — Leifeng is at the bottom of the map (in Chinese)
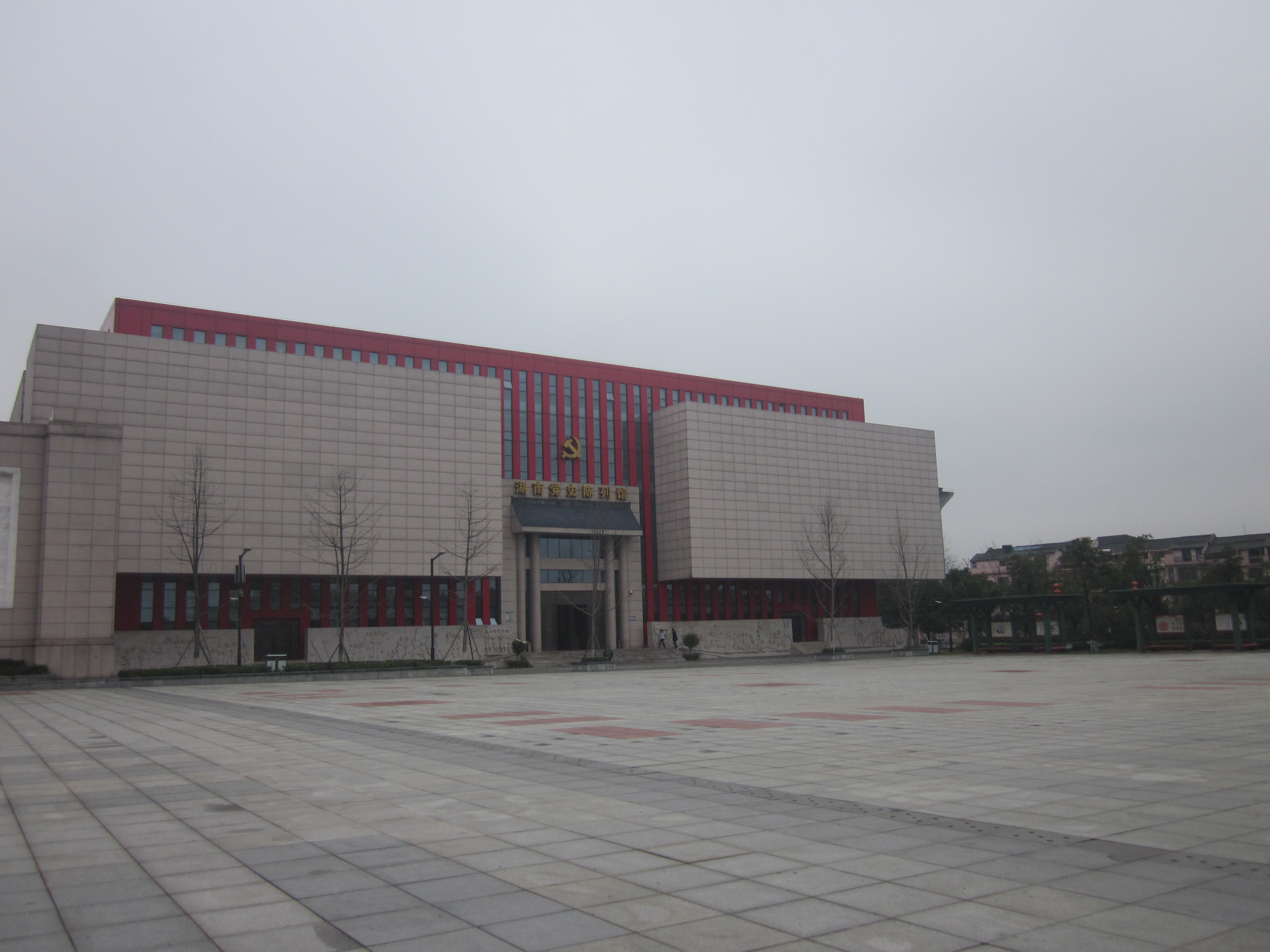
Party History Museum of the CPC Hunan Provincial Committee.

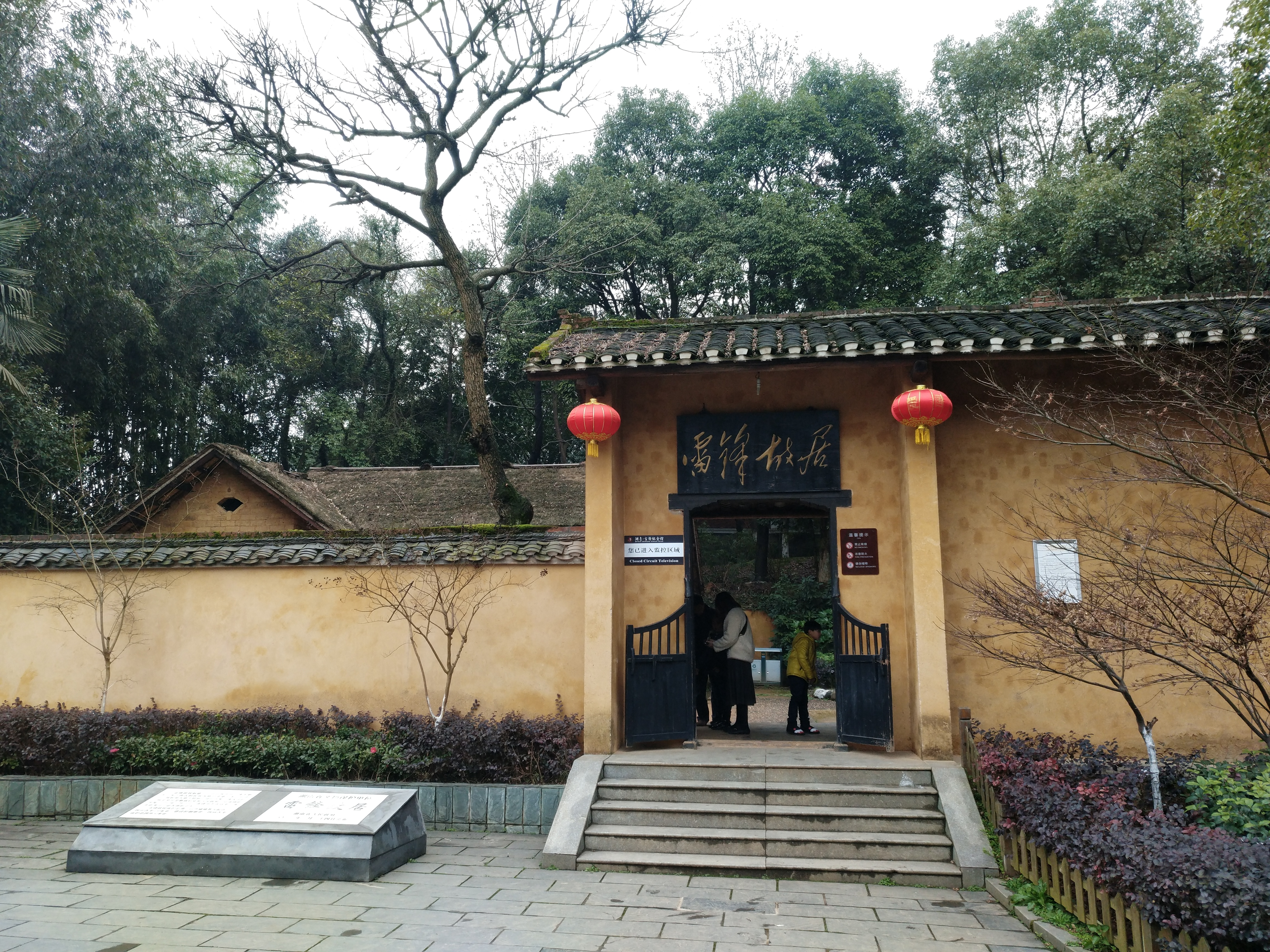
Entrance of the Former Residence of Lei Feng.

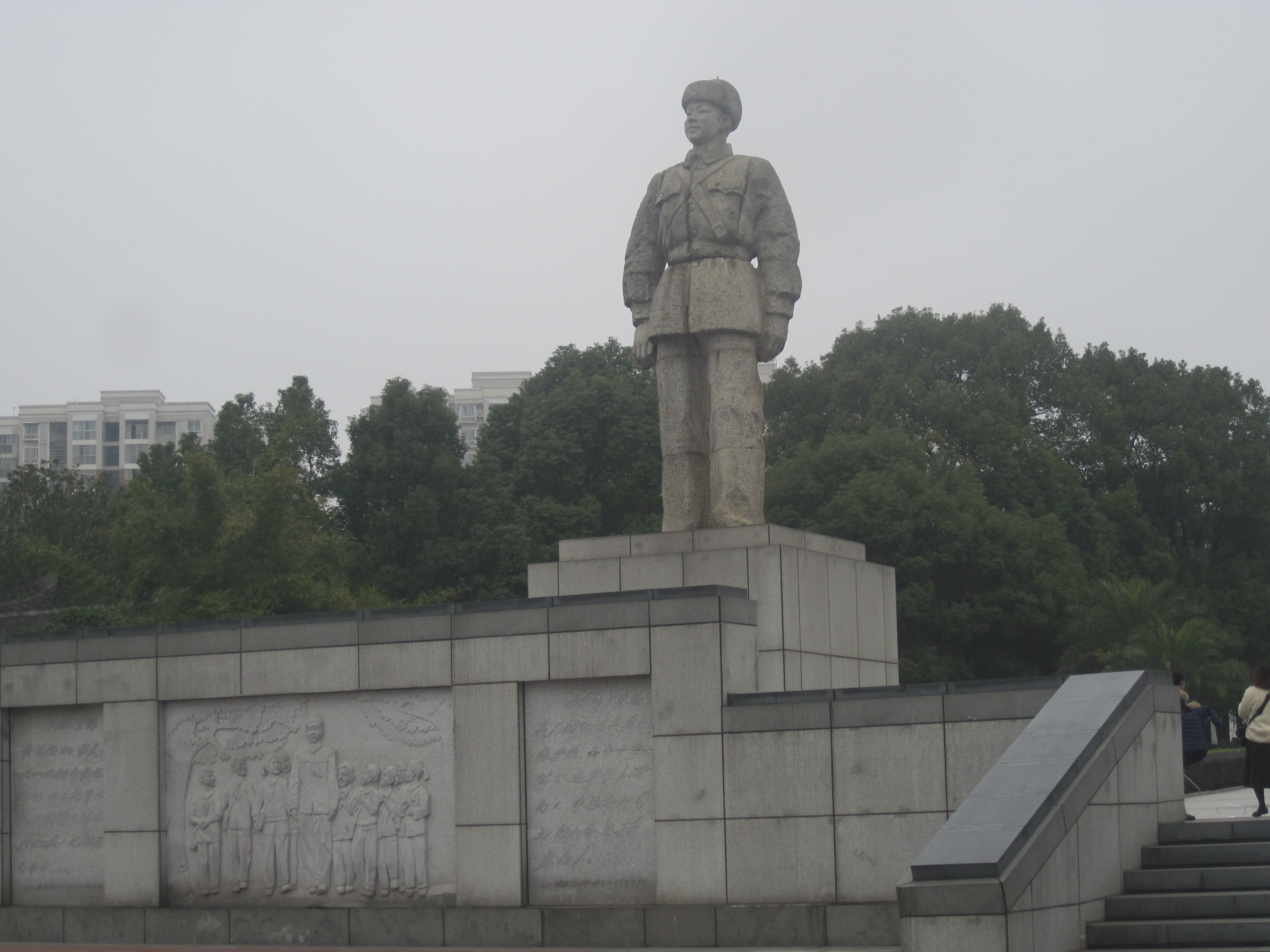
Statue of Lei Feng, Former Residence of Lei Feng.
