= Qiaoyi =

Coordinates: 28.4114°N 112.9270°E

Qiaoyi 桥驿镇
- Town
- Interactive map of Qiaoyi
- Country: People's Republic of China
- Province: Hunan
- Prefecture-level city: Changsha
- District: Wangcheng

Area
  - Total: 103 km^{2} (40 sq mi)

Population
  - Total: 38,400
  - Density: 373/km^{2} (966/sq mi)
- 2012

Qiaoyi (simplified Chinese: 橋驛鎮; traditional Chinese: 桥驿镇; pinyin: Qiáoyì Zhèn) is a town in Wangcheng district, Changsha, Hunan, China. The town is bordered by Chuanshanping town of Miluo and Chating to the north, Beishan town of Changsha county to the east, Shaping and Qingzhuhu subdistricts of Kaifu district to the south, Tongguan Subdistrict to the west. It covers 103.0 km^{2} (39.8 sq mi) with 38.4 thousand of population. The town contains nine villages and residential communities, with its administrative center at Qiaotouyi.

== Subdivision ==
On March 23, 2016, the village-level divisions of Qiaoyi were adjusted from 17 to 9, There eight villages and one residential community.

Administrative divisions of Qiaoyi town in 2016
amount of divisions: one residential community and eight villages
| villages and residential communities | | villages | |
| English name | Chinese name | English name | Chinese name |
| Qiaotouyi residential community | 桥头驿社区 | Shatian village | 沙田村 |
| Heimifeng village formed by merging Lianhe, Fengbei and Dongyang 3 villages on March 23, 2016 | 黑麋峰村; 2016年3月23日由联合村、峰北村、洞阳村合并设置 | Yangqiao village reformed by merging the former Yangqiao and Minwang 2 villages on March 23, 2016 | 杨桥村; 2016年3月23日由原杨桥村、民望村合并设置 |
| Hefeng village reformed by merging the former Hefeng and Longtang 2 villages on March 23, 2016 | 禾丰村; 2016年3月23日由原禾丰村、龙塘村合并设置 | Qunli village reformed by merging the former Qunli and Ma'an villages on March 23, 2016 | 群力村; 2016年3月23日由原群力村、马安村合并设置 |
| Baishi village reformed by merging the former Baishi and Yongfeng villages on March 23, 2016 | 白石村; 2016年3月23日由原白石村、永丰村合并设置 | Minfu village reformed by merging the former Minfu and Dingjia villages on March 23, 2016 | 民福村; 2016年3月23日由原民福村、丁家村合并设置 |
| Hongjia village reformed by merging the former Liqun and Hongjia villages on March 23, 2016 | 洪家村; 2016年3月23日由原力田村、洪家村合并设置 | | |
