= Wushan Subdistrict, Changsha =

Coordinates: 28.3296°N 112.7502°E

Wushan Subdistrict 乌山街道
- subdistrict
- Interactive map of Wushan Subdistrict
- Country: People's Republic of China
- Province: Hunan
- Prefecture-level city: Changsha
- District: Wangcheng

Area
  - Total: 102 km^{2} (39 sq mi)

Population (2000)
  - Total: 37,631
  - Density: 369/km^{2} (956/sq mi)
- Time zone: UTC+8 (China Standard)

Wushan (simplified Chinese: 乌山街道; traditional Chinese: 烏山街道; pinyin: Wūshān Jiēdào) is a subdistrict of Wangcheng District, Changsha, Hunan, China. It is located on the south bank, the lower reaches of Wei river, near the estuary. the subdistrict is bordered by Gaotangling to the north and east, Jinzhou of Ningxiang and Bairuopu to the west, Huangjinyuan and Baishazhou to the south. Wushan covers an area of 97.7 km^{2} (37.7 sq mi) with a population of 60 thousand. The subdistrict has 11 villages and four residential communities under its jurisdiction, with its administrative centre at Yujiaqiao (徐家桥).

== Subdivision ==
At merging of Wushan and Yujiapo on November 19, 2015, the new formed subdistrict had 12 villages and four residential communities. At the adjustment of village-level administrative divisions on March 23, 2016, Chayuan (茶园村) and Jijiaxiang (蓟家巷村) were merged as a new formed village of Weizi (维梓村); the subdistrict has four residential communities and 11 villages in 2016.

Administrative divisions of Wushan subdistrict in 2016
administrative centre: Xujiaqiao residential community (徐家桥社区) amount of divisions: four residential communities and 11 villages
villages and residential communities		villages	
English name	Chinese name	English name	Chinese name
Xujiaqiao residential community	徐家桥社区	Longwangling village	龙王岭村
Renhe residential community	仁和社区	Shuangfeng village	双丰村
Wangwanglu residential community	旺旺路社区	Shuangxing village	双兴村
Yujiapo residential community	喻家坡社区	Tuanshanhu village	团山湖村
Baquhe village	八曲河村	Weizi village formed by Chayuan and Jijiaxiang on March 23, 2016	维梓村
Gaochong village	高冲村	Wushan	乌山村
Huanghualing village	黄花岭村	Yuanjia village	原佳村
Jinshu village	金树村		

== History ==
=== Yujiapo ===
The Yujiapo subdistrict (喻家坡街道) was formed from a portion of Gaotangling on August 28, 2012. There was a population of 40,794, it covered 21.14 km^{2} (8.16 sq mi) with Yujiapo (仁和社区), Renhe (喻家坡社区) and Wangwanglu (旺旺路社区) three residential communities under its jurisdiction. It was merged to Wushan on November 19, 2015.
