= Baishazhou =

Baishazhou Subdistrict 白沙洲街道
- Subdistrict
- Location within Hunan
- Coordinates: 28.3310°N 112.8734°E
- Country: People's Republic of China
- Province: Hunan
- Prefecture-level city: Changsha
- district: Wangcheng

Area
  - Total: 25.44 km^{2} (9.82 sq mi)

Population (2015)
  - Total: 20,709
  - Density: 814.0/km^{2} (2,108/sq mi)
- Time zone: UTC+8 (China Standard)
- Website: http://bsz.wangcheng.gov.cn/

Baishazhou (Chinese: 白沙洲街道; pinyin: báishāzhōu jiēdào) is a subdistrict of Wangcheng District, Changsha, Hunan. It is located on the western bank of the Xiang River. The subdistrict is bordered by Dazehu subdistrict to the south, Jinshanqiao subdistricts to the west, Wushan Subdistrict to the north, Xiufeng subdistrict of Kaifu District and Dingziwan subdistrict across the Xiang river to the east.

The Baishazhou subdistrict was formed by a partition of Xincheng on August 29, 2012. It covers an area of 25.44 km^{2} (9.82 sq mi) with a population of about 20,709 (2015). The subdistrict has one residential community and three villages under its jurisdiction.

== History ==
A its name suggests, it was once an island, but eventually became connected to the mainland due to the shifting course of the Yangtze River.

Baishazhou was formed by the revocation of Xingcheng (and setting up three new subdistricts) in 2012. Xingcheng (星城镇) was formed by Dahu (大湖乡) and Gushan (谷山乡) in 1995. There were 22 villages and two residential communities in 1997.

In July 2012, Xingcheng was changed from a town as a subdistrict. On August 28, 2012, Xingcheng was divided into three subdistricts, they are Baishazhou (白沙洲街道), Dazehu (大泽湖街道) and Yueliangdao (月亮岛街道) subdistricts.

- The Baisha subdistrict contains Maqiaohe (马桥河村), Tengfei (腾飞村) and huangtian (黄田村) three villages;
- The Dazehu subdistrict contains Dongma residential community (东马社区), Xitang (西塘村), Huilong (回龙村) and Nantang (南塘村) villages;
- The Yueliangdao subdistrict contains Yueliangdao residential community (月亮岛社区), Yinxing (银星村), Zhonghualing (中华岭村) and Daigongmiao (戴公庙村) villages.

== See also ==
- Yingwuzhou
