= Gaotangling =

Coordinates: 28°22′N 112°49′E

Gaotangling subdistrict 高塘岭街道
- Subdistrict
- Interactive map of Gaotangling subdistrict
- Country: People's Republic of China
- Province: Hunan
- Prefecture-level city: Changsha
- District: Wangcheng

Area
  - Total: 69.07 km^{2} (26.67 sq mi)

Population (2016)
  - Total: 140,000
  - Density: 2,000/km^{2} (5,200/sq mi)
- Time zone: UTC+8 (China Standard)
- Website: http://gtl.wangcheng.gov.cn

Gaotangling Subdistrict (simplified Chinese: 高塘岭街道; traditional Chinese: 高塘嶺街道; pinyin: gāotánglǐng jiēdào) is a subdistrict and the seat of Wangcheng District in Changsha, Hunan Province, China. It is located on the western bank of the Xiang river, also the lower reaches of Wei river, a tributary of the Xiang. The subdistrict is bordered by Jinggang Town to the north, Shuangjiangkou to the west, Wushan to the southwest, Tongguan across the Xiang river to the east.

The Gaotangling Subdistrict was reformed by Xinkang township (新康乡) and the former Gaotangling Subdistrict on November 19, 2015. It covers an area of 69.07 km^{2} (26.67 sq mi) with a population of about 140,000. The subdistrict has 10 residential communities and nine villages under its jurisdiction.

== History ==
The Gaotangling Subdistrict was reformed by merging of the former Gaotangling Subdistrict and Xingkang township on November 19, 2015.

=== Pre-Gaotangling ===
Gaotangling was a portion of Rende township (仁德乡) of Changsha county (长沙县) in 1949; Gaotangling commune (高塘岭公社) was formed in 1959. Chengguan town (城关镇) was formed from a portion of Gaotangling commune In 1979; Gaotangling commune was renamed Gaotangling township in 1983. Gaotangling township was merged to Chengguan town in 1985; Chengguan town was renamed Gaotangling town in 1995. Gaotangling town contained 10 residential communities and 10 villages in 1995.

According to 2010 census, there was a population of 72,171. Gaotangling town was renamed Gaotangling Subdistrict in June 2012. It contained nine residential communities and four villages, and covered 42.61 km^{2} (16.45 sq mi) with a population of 98,900.

On August 28, 2012, Gaotangling Subdistrict was divided into Gaotangling and Yujiapo (喻家坡街道) two subdistricts. Gaotangling covered 21.47 km^{2} (8.29 sq mi) with six residential communities under its jurisdiction. Yujiapo had 21.14 km^{2} (8.16 sq mi) with three residential communities under its jurisdiction. The Yujiapo Subdistrict was merged to Wushan on November 19, 2015.

On November 19, 2015, Xinkang township (新康乡) was merged to the Gaotangling Subdistrict.

=== Xinkang township ===
The former Xinkang township (新康乡) was the place of Xinkang township of Changsha county in 1949. It was divided into Tuojiang (沱川乡) and Sihe (四合乡) townships in 1951. The place was merged to Jinggang Commune (靖港公社) in 1958, and was reformed as a commune (新康公社) from a portion of Jinggang in 1961. It was renamed as a township in 1984.

== Subdivision ==
The former Gaotangling Subdistrict and Xinkang township (新康乡) was merged to Gaotangling on November 19, 2015. On March 23, 2016, Xinkangjizhen residential community (新康集镇社区) and Tanjiayuan village (谭家湖村) were merged as Xinkang residential community (新康社区); Xingwang (兴旺村) and Heyi (合益村) were merged as Mingsheng village (名盛村); the subdistrict has 10 residential communities nine villages under its jurisdiction.

Administrative divisions of Gaotangling Subdistrict in 2016
10 residential communities		9 villages	
Baifutang (白芙塘社区); Banmahu (斑马湖社区); Gaotang (高塘社区); Gaotangling (高塘岭社区); Hangyun (航运社区)	Leifenglu (雷锋路社区) Lianghu (莲湖社区); Wangfulu (望府路社区); Xinkangjizhen (新康社区); Xitangjie (西塘街社区)	Changlian (长联村); Hesheng (合盛村); Liuheyuan (六合围村); Shengli village (胜利村); Xiangjiang (湘江村)	Xinhe (新河村); Xinyang (新阳村); Yueyuan (月园村); Yunong village (裕农村)

=== Subdivisions at merging in 2015 ===
The former Gaotangling Subdistrict and Xinkang township (新康乡) was merged to Gaotangling on November 19, 2015; at that time there were 10 residential communities and 11 villages.

Subdivisions at merging as a subdistrict and the township on November 19, 2015
the former Gaotangling Subdistrict (9 residential communities and two villages)		Xinkang township (1 residential community and nine villages)	
Baifutang (白芙塘社区); Banmahu (斑马湖社区); Gaotang (高塘社区); Gaotangling (高塘岭社区); Hangyun (航运社区); Leifenglu (雷锋路社区)	Lianghu (莲湖社区); Wangfulu (望府路社区); Xitangjie (西塘街社区); Shengli village (胜利村); Yunong village (裕农村)	Xinkangjizhen (新康集镇社区); Changlian (长联村); Xinyang (新阳村); Liuheyuan (六合围村); Xingwang (兴旺村); Yueyuan (月园村)	Xiangjiang (湘江村); Xinhe (新河村); Tanjiayuan (谭家湖村); Heyi (合益村)

=== Subdivision of pre-Gaotangling before 2015 ===
Gaotangling Subdistrict was divided into Gaotangling and Yujiapo on August 28, 2012, the Gaotangling Subdistrict had six residential communities and four villages; the Yujiapo subdistrict had three residential communities.

Gaotangling Subdistrict was divided into Gaotangling and Yujiapo on August 28, 2012
Gaotangling Subdistrict		Yujiapo Subdistrict
4 villages	6 residential communities	3 residential communities
Shengli (胜利村); Yuanjia (原佳村); Gaochong (高冲村); Yunong (裕农村)	Gaotangling (高塘岭社区); Xitangjie (西塘街社区); Leifenglu (雷锋路社区); Baifutang (白芙塘社区); Gaotang (高塘社区); Lianghutang (莲湖社区)	Yujiapo (喻家坡社区); Wangwanglu (旺旺路社区); Renhe (仁和社区)

Gaotangling contained 10 residential communities and 10 villages in 1995.

1995 administrative divisions of Gaotangling town
10 residential communities		10 villages	
Gaotangling (高塘岭); Baifurong (白芙塘); Baimaxiang (白马巷); Gongnonglu (工农路); Laodonglu (劳动路)	Maolinyuan (茂林园); Tiyulu (体育路); Wangwanglu (旺旺路); Xiangjianglu(湘江路); Xitangjie (西塘街)	Gaotang (高塘); Pangtang (滂塘); Gaochong (高冲); Lianhutang (莲湖塘); Renhe (仁和)	Shengli (胜利); Yujiapo (喻家坡); Xiaohu (小湖); Yunong (裕农); Zhujiachong (朱家冲)
