= Wangcheng, Changsha =

Wangcheng 望城区
- District
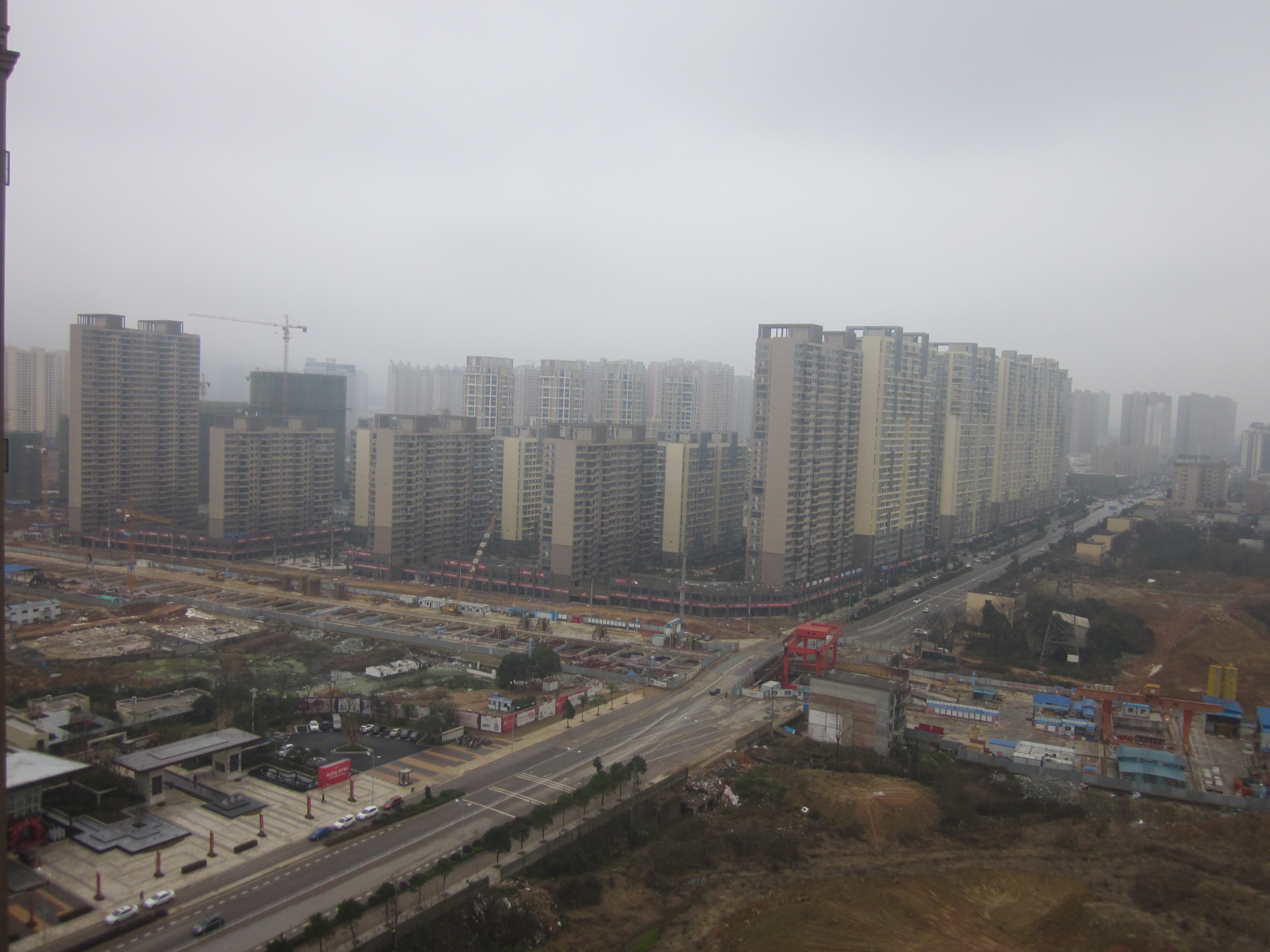

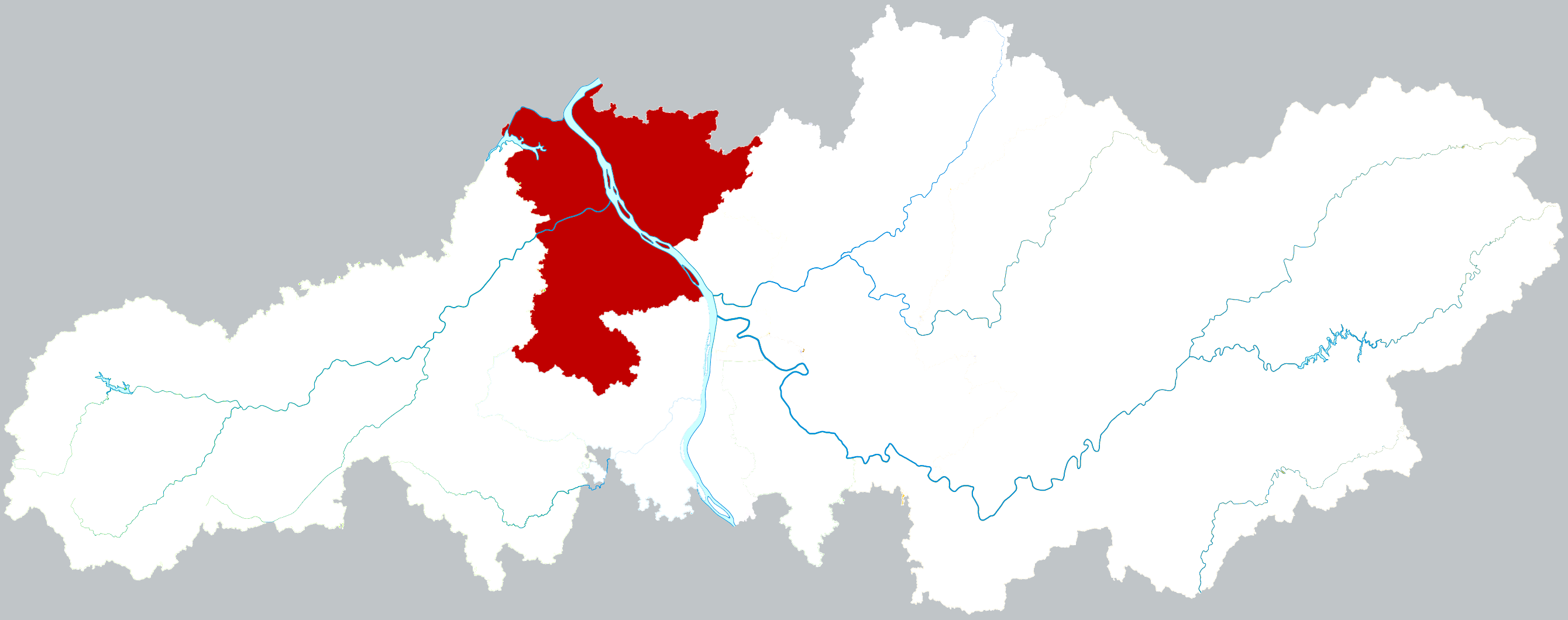
- Location of Wangcheng District within Changsha

- Location in Hunan
- Coordinates: 28°21′13″N 112°49′53″E
- Country: People's Republic of China
- Province: Hunan
- Prefecture-level city: Changsha
- Seat: Gaotangling

Area
  - Total: 951.06 km^{2} (367.21 sq mi)

Population (2011)
  - Total: 527,600
  - Density: 554.7/km^{2} (1,437/sq mi)
- Time zone: UTC+8 (China Standard)
- Website: www.wangcheng.gov.cn

Wangcheng District (simplified Chinese: 望城区; traditional Chinese: 望城區; pinyin: Wàngchéng Qū) is one of six urban districts of the prefecture-level city of Changsha, the capital of Hunan Province, China. It is the largest district of Changsha by area. The district is bordered to the north by Miluo City and Xiangyin County of Yueyang, to the west by Heshan District of Yiyang and Ningxiang County, to the south by Yuelu and Kaifu Districts, to the east by Changsha County. Located in the northsouth of the City proper in Changsha, Wangcheng covers 951.06 km^{2} (367.21 sq mi) with registered population of 560,567 and resident population of 562,100 (as of 2014). The district has 10 subdistricts and 5 towns under its jurisdiction, with its administrative centre at Gaotangling Subdistrict.

== History ==
Wangcheng was formed from a portion of Changsha County, dividing the Changsha County into two counties of Changsha and Wangcheng in 1951, remerging into the Changsha County in 1957, recreating in December 1977 based on the original area at its abolishment in 1957. The former Wangcheng County was reorganized to Wangcheng District of Changsha on 20 May 2011.

The name "Wangcheng" originated from the county seat where it was located in Wangchengpo (Chinese: 望城坡; pinyin: Wàngchéng Pō), on the west bank of the Xiang River in Changsha. At the time the county was formed, the county seat was transferred to Gaotangling (simplified Chinese: 高塘岭; traditional Chinese: 髙塘嶺; pinyin: gāo táng lǐng), the south side of the Wei River mouth in 1952.

== Geography ==
Located in the central north of Changsha, in the low reaches of the Xiang River, Wangcheng adjoins east to Changsha county, Miluo, north to Xiangyin, the Heshan District of Yiyang, west to Ningxiang, southwest to the Yuelu, southeast to the Kaifu. It covers an area of 951.06 sq. kilometers, accounting for 8.05% of Changsha; as one of six urban districts, it shares 49.8% of Changsha urban area.

== Subdivisions ==
According to the result on adjustment of township-level administrative divisions of Wangcheng District on November 19, 2015, Wangcheng has 10 subdistricts and 5 towns under its jurisdiction. They are:

10 subdistricts

- Baishazhou Subdistrict (白沙州街道)
- Dazehu Subdistrict (大泽湖街道)
- Dingziwan Subdistrict (丁字湾街道)
- Gaotangling Subdistrict (高塘岭街道)
- Huangjinyuan Subdistrict (黄金园街道)
- Jinshanqiao Subdistrict (金山桥街道)
- Leifeng Subdistrict (雷锋街道)
- Tongguan Subdistrict (铜官街道)
- Wushan Subdistrict (乌山街道)
- Yueliangdao Subdistrict (月亮岛街道)

5 towns

- Bairuopu (白箬铺镇)
- Chating (茶亭镇)
- Jinggang (靖港镇)
- Qiaokou (乔口镇)
- Qiaoyi (桥驿镇)

== Economy ==
According to preliminary accounting of the statistical authority, the gross domestic product of Wangcheng District in 2017 was 65,876 million yuan (9,757 million US dollars), up by 11.2 percent over the previous year. Of this total, the value added of the primary industry was 4,553 million yuan (674 million US dollars), up by 5.5 percent, that of the secondary industry was 46,742 million yuan (6,923 million US dollars), up by 11.4 percent and that of the tertiary industry was 14,581 million yuan (2,160 million US dollars), up by 12.4 percent. The value added of the primary industry accounted for 6.91 percent of the GDP; that of the secondary industry accounted for 70.95 percent; and that of the tertiary industry accounted for 22.13 percent. The per capita GDP by year-end household population in 2017 was about 109,000 yuan (16,144 US dollars).

Wangcheng Economic and Technological Development Zone (WETZ) was established on 13 July 2000, upgraded to an ETZ at state level on 15 February 2014. It covers Baishazhou, Huangjinyuan, Jinshanqiao and Wushan 4 subdistricts. It has an approved area of 6.33 km^{2} (2.44 sq mi) and a planning area of 59.6 km^{2} (23.0 sq mi). The dominant industries in the zone are non-ferrous metal new materials, food, electronic information and business logistics. As of 2015, there are 635 registered enterprises, 32 of the total are public or the global Top500 companies. The total industrial gross output in the zone hits 77 billion yuan (US$12.36 billion) and the industrial added value is 20 billion yuan (US$3.21 billion).
