= List of tallest buildings in Changsha =

Tall buildings in Changsha
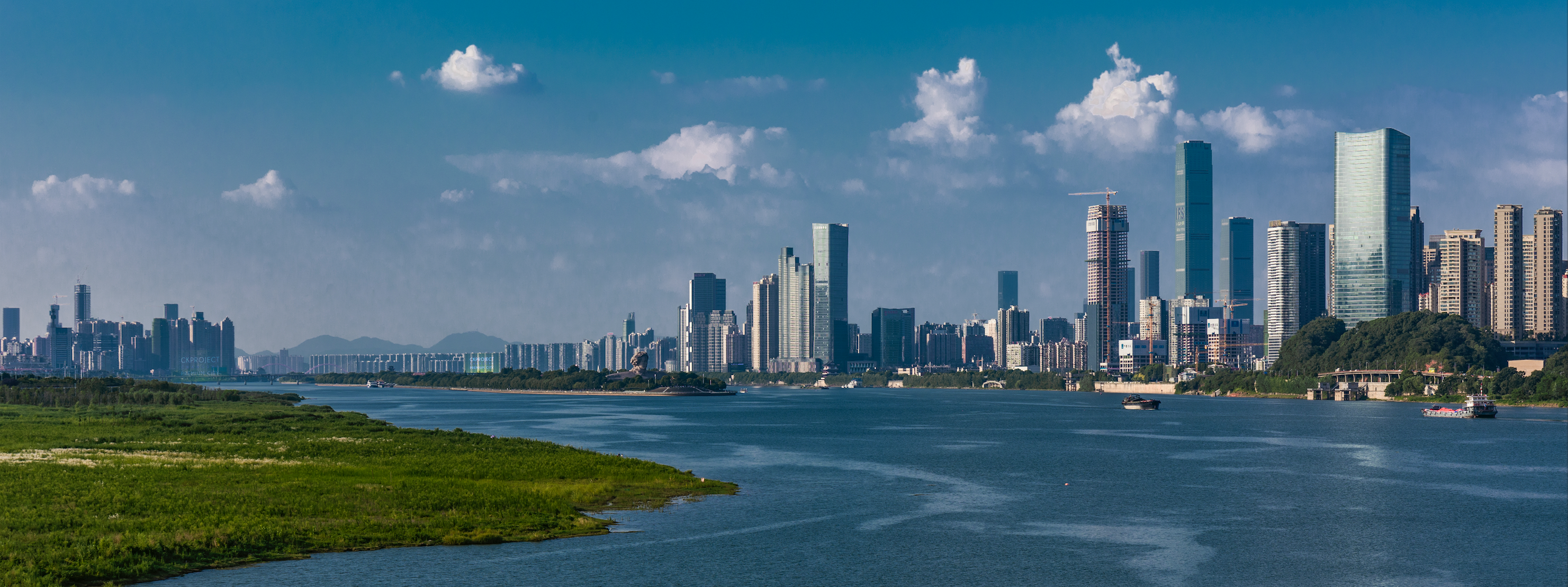
- Skyline of Changsha on the Xiang River
- Tallest building: Changsha IFS Tower T1 (2018)
- Tallest building height: 452.1 m (1,483 ft)
- First 150 m+ building: Agricultural Bank of China Tower (1984)

Number of tall buildings
- Taller than 150 m (492 ft): 85 (2025)
- Taller than 200 m (656 ft): 46 (2025)
- Taller than 300 m (984 ft): 6 (2025) (9th)
- Taller than 400 m (1,312 ft): 1

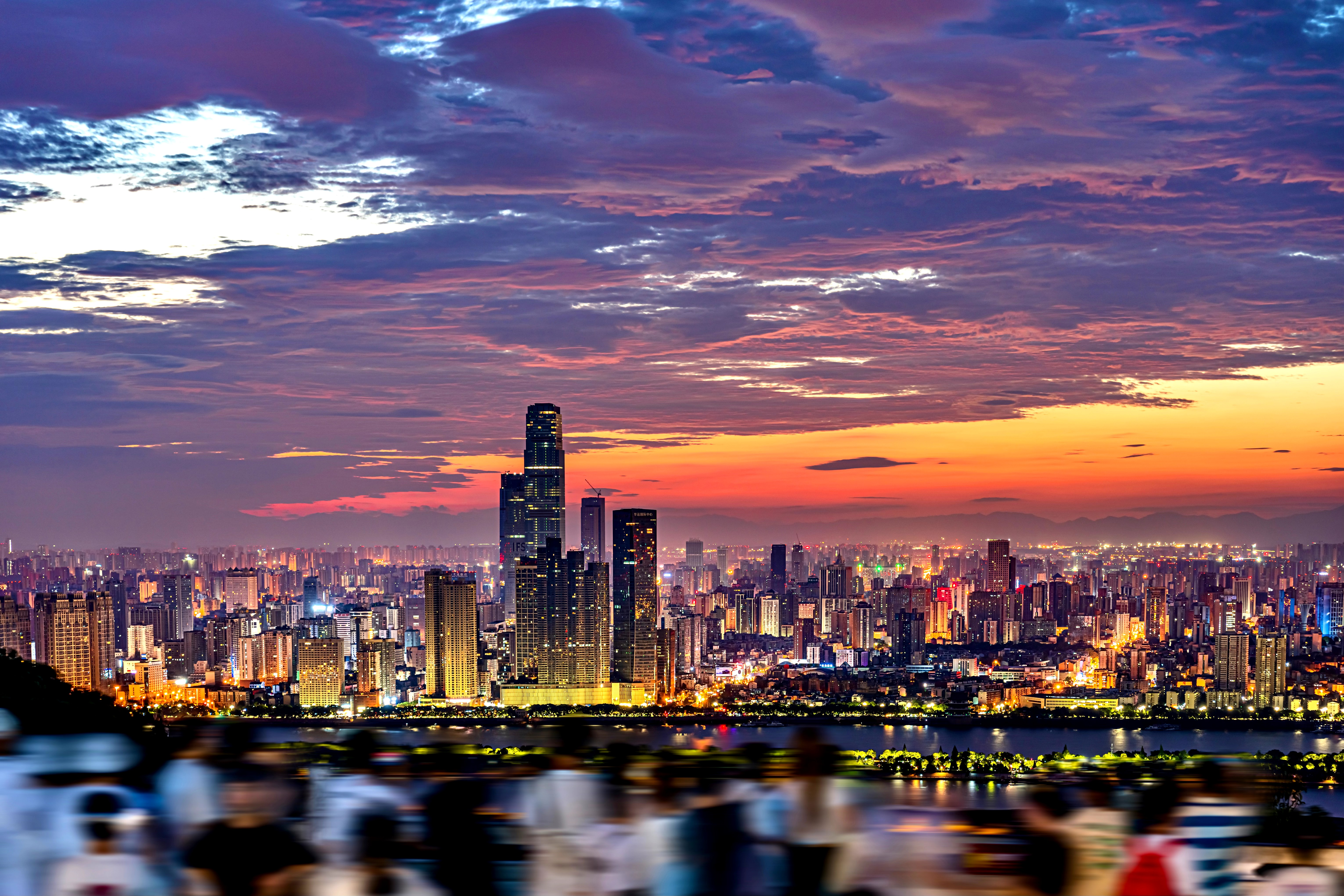
Changsha from Yuelu Mountain in 2023

The Chinese city of Changsha is home to 85 skyscrapers with a height of over 150 metres (492 feet) as of 2026, 46 of which are taller than 200 m (656 ft). Changsha is the capital and largest city of the Chinese province of Hunan, with a population of 10.5 million and an urban population of over 5.9 million. It is a major financial, industrial, and research center in southern China.

Few skyscrapers were built in Changsha before 2010, with the most significant being the Lotus Garden China Telecom Building, a 208 m (682 ft) office tower completed in 2003. Beginning from the mid-2010s, Changsha underwent a major high-rise boom, owing to the city's rapidly growing population. It has since seen a massive growth in the number of skyscrapers in the city. The record for the city's tallest building was broken several times between 2014 and 2018, when the current tallest building, Changsha IFS Tower T1, was completed. The office and hotel skyscraper is 452 m (1,483 ft) tall, and is the 20th tallest building in the world.

After the construction of its first supertall skyscraper (buildings measuring over 300 metres in height) in 2017, Huachuang International Plaza Tower 1, Changsha added four more supertall skyscrapers in a short span of four years. As of 2025, Changsha has six supertall skyscrapers; it is hence tied with Hong Kong, Kuala Lumpur, Moscow, and Nanning as the city with the ninth most supertall skyscrapers in the world.

Many of Changsha's skyscrapers can be found in the central districts of Kaifu and Furong, near the Xiang River. Additionally, there is a cluster of tall buildings located in the subdistrict of Meixihu, surrounding Meixi Lake, including the city's newest supertall building, the Meixi Lake Changsha Jinmao Building. Another notable high-rise is J57 Mini Sky City, which was built in 2015 in only 19 days. The developer, Broad Group, had previously planned to build a 838 m (2749 ft) building named Sky City, which would have been the tallest building in the world. The project stalled in 2013, and the site has been repurposed as a fish farm.

== Tallest buildings ==
The following table lists all skyscrapers in Changsha with a height above 200 meters (656 feet).

Was the tallest building in Changsha upon completion

Rank	Name	Image	Height	Floors	Year	Notes
1	Changsha IFS Tower T1		452.1 m	94	2018	Tallest building in Changsha.
2	Shimao Global Financial Center		343 m	74	2019	
3	Xiangjiang Fortune Finance Center Tower 1		327 m	65	2020	
4	Meixi Lake Changsha Jinmao Building		318.1 m	62	2024	
5	Changsha IFS Tower T2		308 m	63	2018	
6	Huachuang International Plaza Tower 1		300 m	66	2017	Tallest building in Changsha from 2017 to 2018.
7	Xinchu Qingtian Plaza Tower 1		299.9 m	58	2024	
8	Xinchu Qingtian Plaza Tower 2		285.8	62	2023	
9	Phase IV Grand Hyatt & Super Office Tower		263 m	60	2016	Tallest building in Changsha from 2016 to 2017.
10	First Financial City Tower 1		262 m	55	2021	
11	First Financial City Tower 2		262 m	55	2021	
12	Xiangjiang Fortune Finance Center Tower 2		261.9 m	52	2020	
13	Yunda Central Plaza Phase 3 Tower 1		249 m	65	2024	
14	Yunda Central Plaza Phase 3 Tower 1		249 m	65	2024	
15	Yunda Central Plaza - St. Regis Hotel		248.8 m	63	2016	
16	Shimao Riviera		240 m	53	2021	
17	Jinmao International Plaza Tower 1		238 m	51	2017	
18	Changsha Huarong Xiangjiang Bank Headquarters		238 m	42	2022	
19	Hunan Daily Media Center		238 m	54	2017	
20	Jinmao International Plaza Tower 2		236.8 m	52	2017	
21	Poly Nanhu Plaza 1		235 m	57	2015	Joint tallest building in Changsha from 2015 to 2016.
22	Changsha Xinhe Delta Office		235 m	47	2014	Tallest building in Changsha from 2014 to 2015; joint tallest from 2015 to 2016.
23	Westin Hotel		230 m	46	2018	
24	China Resources MixC Tower 1		228.7 m	54	2024	
25	Bofu International Plaza Office Tower		228 m	60	2014	
26	Huizhong Development Center Tower B		228 m	50	2020	
27	Huizhong Development Center Tower A		228 m	47	2020	
28	Phase III Townhouse Tower		224.3 m	65	2016	
29	Zhengrong Meixi Zique Terrace Tower 2		223.8 m	55	2023	
30	Changsha Fuxing World Financial Center T1		219 m	44	2017	
31	New Urbanism City		217 m	49	2016	
32	Changsha Yulin International Building C		214.6 m	44	2018	
33	BBK Star City Tower 1		213 m	-	2024	
34	Beichen Delta A3 Tower 1		212.5 m	58	2021	
35	Damei World Center		212.5 m	-	2024	
36	Changsha Ping An Fortune Center		211.2 m	49	2022	
37	Changsha No. 2 Telecom Hinge Building		208 m	42	2003	
38	J57 Mini Sky City		207.8 m	57	2015	
39	Yunda Central Plaza - Block B		206 m (Note: Height is an estimate.)	47	2022	
40	Emerald Bay Tower 1		205.8 m	45	2024	
41	Greenland Center T1		205.5 m	44	2019	
42	Excellence Zhonghuan Centre 1		205 m	44	2023	
43	Evergrande Junyue Residences Tower 1		205 m	50	2024	
44	Changsha Nanshan Shilimeixi Building C1		202.2 m	48	2023	
45	Hunan International Finance Building		200 m	43	1998	
46	Zhonglong International Jiaxi Center Tower A		200 m	45	2017	

== Tallest under construction or proposed ==
=== Under construction ===
This lists ranks skyscrapers that are under construction in Changsha that are expected to be at least 150 m (492 ft) tall as of 2026, based on standard height measurement. The “Year” column indicates the expected year of completion. Buildings that are on hold are not included.

Rank	Building	Height	Floors	Usage	Year	Notes
1	Shengtong International Headquarters Center Tower 1	279 m	55	Office	2025	
2	Qingxi Center	255.5 m	64	Office	2025	
3	Poly West Coast Tower 1	250 m	-	Office	2025	
4	Meixi Lake Centre Tower 1	245.9 m	69	Residential / Office	2025	
5	Minmetals Plaza Tower 1	242 m	-	Office	2025	
6	Beichen Yuejiangyang Tower 1	240.1 m	57		2025	
7	Zhongxin Times Square Tower 1	219.7 m	57	Office / Hotel	2026	
8	Shengtong International Headquarters Center Tower 2	219 m	53	Hotel / Residential	2025	
9	Greenland Intercity Station T2	206 m	42	Office / Hotel	2025	
10	Greenland Intercity Station T1	206 m	41	Office	2025	
11	Zhongxin Times Square Tower 2	202.8 m	47	Office	2026	
12	Poly West Coast Tower 2	200 m	-	Office	2025	

== Timeline of tallest buildings ==
Name	Image	Years as tallest	Height (m)	Floors
Agricultural Bank of China Tower		1984–1998	160	47
Hunan International Finance Building		1998–2003	200	43
Changsha No. 2 Telecom Hinge Building		2003–2014	208	42
Changsha Xinhe Delta Office		2014–2015	235	47
Poly Nanhu Plaza 1		2015–2016	235	57
Phase IV Grand Hyatt & Super Office Tower		2016–2017	263	60
Huachuang International Plaza Tower 1		2017–2018	300	66
Changsha IFS Tower T1		2018–present	452.1	94
