= Eco-cities in China =

Urban development projects in China

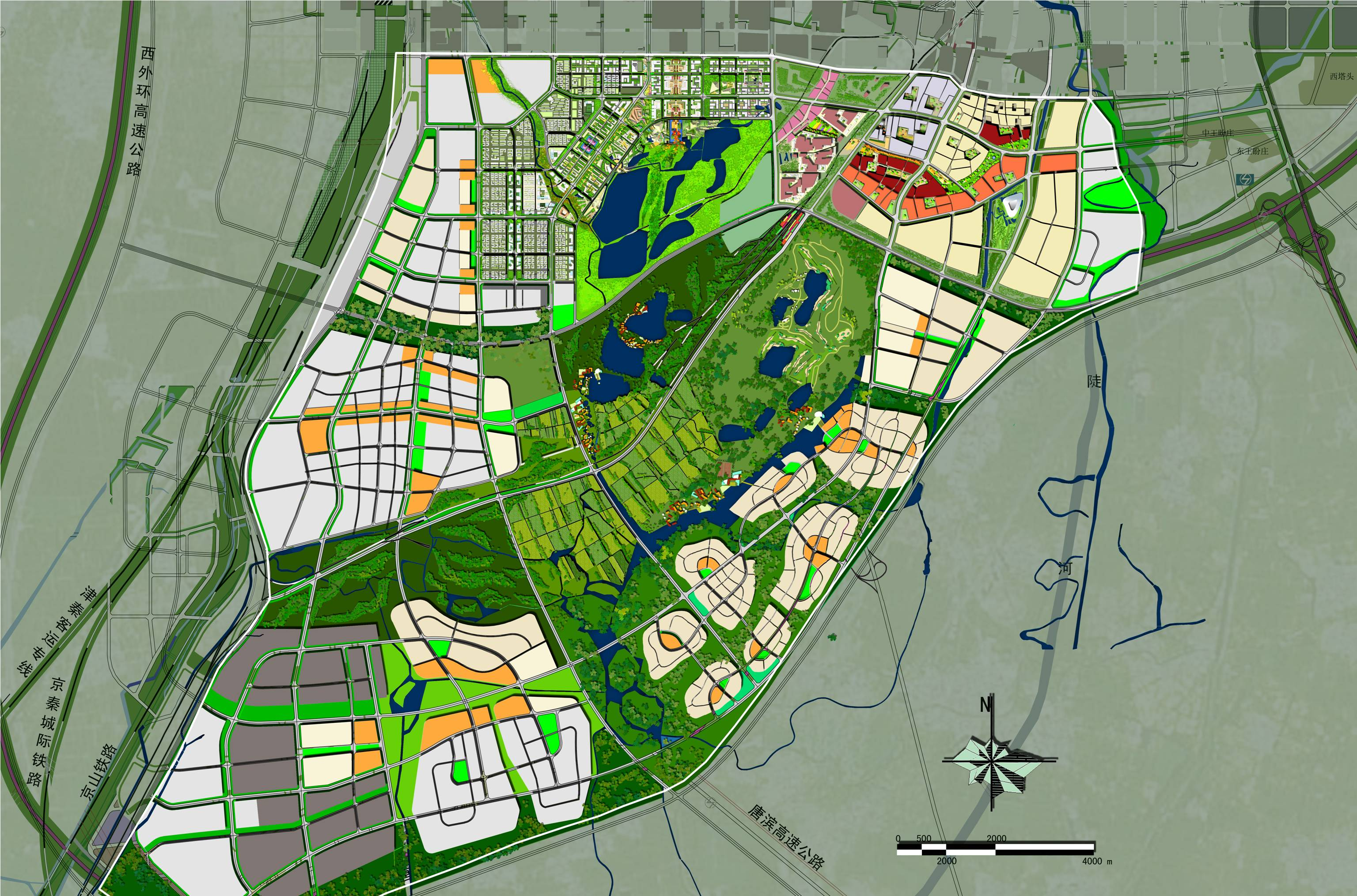
Design for the eco-city in Tangshan, China.

Eco-cities in the People's Republic of China are planned urban development projects that are envisioned as models of sustainable development, seeking to address challenges of rapid urbanization, environmental degradation, and resource constraints.

The concept of eco-cities in China gained significant attention and support from the government in the early 2000s, driven by the need to address the country's urbanization challenges, and combat pollution and resource depletion. The Chinese government, through various initiatives and policies, has encouraged the development of eco-cities across the country, promoting them as showcases of sustainable urban development and engines of economic growth. China now boasts the largest eco-city development program in the world.

Most Chinese eco-city projects remain under construction, limiting the ability to assess the overall efficacy of these programs. While proponents argue these cities represent innovative solutions to urban sustainability with the potential to reduce carbon emissions, enhance resource efficiency, and improve the quality of life for urban residents, some critics have raised concerns about the efficacy, funding, implementation gaps, and environmental impact of these projects.

== Concepts and trends ==
There is no singular, official definition of an eco-city; however, these developments generally strive to reduce fossil fuel consumption, carbon emissions, and dependence on natural resources while emphasizing the preservation of local ecosystems.

The creation of eco-cities in China parallels a global trend in urban sustainable development. However, these Chinese eco-cities also promote unique characteristics rooted in traditional Chinese cultural values that emphasize harmony with nature, similar to concepts like feng shui. Chinese ideologists insist that the achievements of Western industrial civilization contributed to the rapid development of industry in the New and Modern times, but the Eastern civilization, having assimilated its achievements, reawakened and revived the essence of Chinese traditional philosophy, which is the basis for modern eco-cultural construction in the PRC. In this regard, in order to solve modern problems, China must rely on traditional philosophy, accumulating the achievements of the past to solve the problems of the future. This concept is called "Five in One" (五位一体). According to it, eco-cities (also sometimes referred to as "green cities") in China should be developed based on the principles of sustainable development, combining in their nature the principles of economic, political, cultural, social and ecological construction. The government has promoted eco-cities as a means of achieving the goals of creating a harmonious society and an ecological civilization.

Others state that current Chinese eco-city development and China's overall relationship with the environment have far less to do with these beliefs, such as Confucianism, than ideologists claim, with current perspectives and design plans aligning more with western beliefs. This ideological incongruence has impacts on China's current and past eco-city projects, especially in regards to urban planning and development.

=== Common features ===
Chinese eco-cities are typically initiated as pilot projects led by local governments, often with sponsorship from the central government. This approach has resulted in a diverse patchwork of development strategies across different cities. Chinese eco-city development has generally favored the construction of new developments rather than retrofitting existing urban spaces.

Urban design in Chinese eco-cities frequently emphasizes compact, mixed-use layouts to reduce urban sprawl. These designs often aim to conserve farmland for increased food security and to encourage sustainable transportation by prioritizing walkability, implementing bike-share programs, and expanding public transit options.

Renewable energy usage is a key priority in eco-city development, with a focus on solar, wind, bioenergy, and hydropower. Efforts to improve energy efficiency encompass various initiatives, such as recycled heat systems, smart grids, and green buildings. Recycling programs are also commonly integrated into Chinese eco-cities.

These cities often seek to attract low-carbon industries and experiment with innovative approaches including circular economies, low-carbon ports and food production, and ecotourism. Environmental technology is often the primary means of meeting city sustainability goals, with eco-cities serving as testing grounds for new urban technologies.

=== Funding ===
Construction is typically managed through local pilot projects with central government sponsorship. As a result, funding mechanisms vary significantly, with some projects receiving robust national support and substantial foreign investment, while others rely on local funding or a combination of funding sources. Disparate funding sources have resulted in a wide range of characteristics among eco-cities, as local governments are encouraged to innovate and adopt different strategies.

Many eco-city projects engage international partners to secure funding. International collaboration allows eco-cities to tap into additional resources, leverage international knowledge and experience, and enhance brand value.

=== Comparison with global eco-cities ===
One key distinction between Chinese eco-city development and global programs lies in the level of central government involvement. While global eco-city projects are typically fragmented, singular projects initiated by local governments, Chinese eco-city development is actively encouraged and promoted by the central government, resulting in a large volume of projects. Unlike the bottom-up model commonly found in global projects, where local governments lobby for national recognition, Chinese projects follow a top-down approach by implementing local-level projects that respond to existing national targets and policies.

As a consequence, Chinese eco-city projects tend to be larger in scale. While global eco-city development often focuses on retrofitting existing urban spaces, China's initiatives predominantly involve building new cities from scratch. This approach is primarily driven by the need to address the challenges of rapid urbanization in the country. Due to their ambitious scale, Chinese eco-city projects typically have longer construction timelines and require larger investment and funding streams. Reliance on external investment, especially for long-term and large-scale funding, has presented challenges in completing many projects.

=== Ecological Island Carbon Neutrality Demonstration Zones ===
Ecological Island Carbon Neutrality Demonstration Zones are an extension of the eco-city concept that applies related environmental policies and infrastructure across entire island communities. Such projects typically focus on ecologically sensitive or geographically isolated areas, where planning can be implemented at the scale of the island as a whole. Chongming Eco-island is an example of this approach in China, while similar initiatives have been proposed or considered for other islands.

== History ==
Rapid changes in the Chinese economy and population have led to the adoption of eco-city construction as the primary strategy for urban development in China.

=== Background ===
Beginning in the late 1970s, the reform and opening up triggered a massive wave of urbanization, considered the largest migration in human history, with over 500 million people relocating from rural areas to cities since the 1980s. These reforms transformed China from a predominantly rural society to an urban one, resulting in significant environmental challenges and exacerbating climate change.

The country's rapid industrialization, driven by the expansion of heavy industries and manufacturing, has also had detrimental environmental consequences. Industrialization has resulted in high pollution and a substantial increase in greenhouse gas emissions which have made China the largest emitter of greenhouse gasses globally. The country's transition to a market-based economy further fueled urbanization, as the Chinese government has actively promoted urban migration to boost domestic demand and stimulate economic growth.

The construction of cities to accommodate the growing urban population has had adverse environmental impacts. The conversion of natural land into urban centers has led to the formation of heat islands and increased pollution. The construction of urban infrastructure, including roads and buildings, has also contributed to increased carbon emissions.

Supporting the burgeoning urban population has also contributed to increased carbon emissions, with cities accounting for the majority of Chinese emissions. Despite urban buildings typically being more energy-efficient, per capita emissions in urban areas surpass those in rural areas. Urbanization has further heightened China's energy demand. Construction and energy requirements for buildings alone account for approximately half of China's energy-related emissions. The rise of consumerism in China has also contributed to increased environmental impacts, with urbanization and consumer culture driving greater natural resource consumption, sedentary lifestyles, and changing diets which have also resulted in rising obesity rates and lifestyle diseases. The expansion of urban infrastructure and services to meet the needs of city residents has also intensified energy consumption and emissions.

These factors have encouraged the adoption of eco-city construction as a response to the ecological and social challenges stemming from China's rapid urbanization, industrial development, and economic growth. Eco-cities now serve as an official method for mitigating the impacts of urbanization and in China's climate change strategy.

Because its adoption is so encouraged, over the past 30 years interest in and research about eco-cities and their development has increased significantly in China. There has been a distinct focus on how to sustainably develop urban areas and create new green infrastructure as it relates to these urban areas.

=== Policies ===
Rapid urbanization in China has led to social and environmental challenges, but it has also provided an opportunity to embrace eco-cities to support urban growth and promote sustainable new cities that can cater to the expanding urban population for generations. Recognizing the need to reduce carbon emissions and address climate change, the Chinese government has embraced the concept of eco-cities as a means of achieving these national goals.

China and the United Kingdom in 2005 announced an initiative to jointly create "the world's first carbon neutral eco-city." The contemplated development, Dongtan Eco-City, was not ultimately completed. It later influenced other approaches to Chinese eco-cities.

In 2006, the Chinese government announced its commitment to climate issues through the 11th Five-Year Plan, which introduced a renewable energy plan, new regulations, and incentives for local governments. The 17th National Congress of the Chinese Communist Party in 2007 introduced the idea of a "low-carbon eco-city model" as part of a broader "eco-culture" framework, describing it as part of an effort to encourage sustained peace and common prosperity. Also in 2007, the government officially endorsed the concept of an "ecological civilization" and promoted the eco-city model for urban development.

The Ministry of Ecology and Environment initiated the first eco-city program in 2008, followed by the Ministry of Housing and Urban-Rural Development's introduction of the low-carbon eco-city program in 2009 and the National Development and Reform Commission's low-carbon city program in 2010.

The 12th Five-Year Plan's sustainable development agenda encouraged eco-city development. The commitment to eco-city development was reinforced in the 13th Five-Year Plan, which included requirements to increase green building construction and the incorporation of eco-city demonstration projects.

Government regulation restricts land-use changes to only state-approved development projects. Eco-cities provide a means to repurpose rural farmland abandoned due to urbanization, thereby promoting more local migration and reducing migration to Chinese mega-cities.

Eco-cities have become a cornerstone of China's environmental sustainability policies and also serve as a model for urban development for other cities in the country. They are also a crucial component of China's strategy to meet its targets under the Paris Agreement. As a result of policy implementation, China now hosts the largest scale eco-city program in the world.

=== Development ===
The first Chinese eco-city project was announced in 2004. The proposed Dongtan Eco-City in Shanghai was canceled before construction began, but the project's publicity inspired other cities to initiate their own eco-city projects.

China's 2009 economic stimulus allocated US$32.8 billion for low-carbon infrastructure, industry, and communities, which helped increase the development of eco-cities. By 2009, more than 100 Chinese eco-city projects had been announced. More than 90% of cities in China have revealed plans for eco-city projects, amounting to more than 250 eco-city projects. Construction remains ongoing for most Chinese eco-city projects.

Since then, some Chinese developers have tried to combine current smart technology with eco-city projects, creating the concept of a smart-eco city. These seek to combine advances in smart technologies with current efforts at eco-city construction in effort to provide more potential for economic growth within the eco-city sphere, a natural progression given the prohibitive cost of eco-city development. Technology developments like large scale 3D printing, which utilize construction waste and allow for quicker building times alongside cheaper costs, as well as evolution in nature based solutions may help in the development of eco-cities like these. Notable examples of this style of eco-city include the Sino-Singapore Tianjin Eco-City, which adopted smart city goals in 2013, or the Shenzhen eco-city, which has had smaller sectors favor smart eco-city style plans in the past. Like eco-cities overall, the development of these projects is still ongoing, with only a few hundred pilot cities announced by the Chinese government as of 2015.

== Programs ==
While several eco-city programs exist in China, there is currently no unified approach to managing eco-cities, nor an official definition of an eco-city. The absence of a centralized policy or guidelines from the central Chinese government has resulted in a diverse range of programs and projects. Three government agencies have introduced eco-city programs, which review applications from local governments and endorse projects as nationally recognized demonstration projects. However, these agency programs operate independently and often in competition with each other, rather than forming a cohesive national policy. Additionally, some local governments initiate their own eco-city projects without support or recognition from national agencies.

Each agency's program focuses on different priorities. The Ministry of Environmental Protection's eco-city program aligns with the agency's mission of overseeing environmental protection policies, with a primary emphasis on environmental preservation rather than energy and carbon efficiency. The National Development and Reform Commission's low carbon city program is driven by the agency's mandate to implement Five-Year Plans, with a strong emphasis on reducing carbon emissions to meet the targets set in these plans. The Ministry of Housing and Urban-Rural Development's low carbon eco-city program combines elements from the other programs, placing a higher priority on carbon and energy efficiency while also considering pollution reduction and social implications. As the agency responsible for urban and rural settlement, their low carbon eco-city program only recognizes new developments.

Each eco-city project has its own set of measurement and assessment criteria. For example, the Tianjin Eco-City project established its own specific measurement criteria, including 26 Key Performance Indicators that assess factors such as wetland preservation, water quality, and green building standards. However, some local governments do not meet their own stated sustainability metrics, and in some cases, performance may not be measured at all.

== Examples ==
=== Dongtan ===
Dongtan, located in Shanghai, was announced in 2004 as the world's first planned carbon-neutral city. The city aimed to achieve a 60% reduction in carbon emissions and a 66% reduction in energy consumption compared to traditional Chinese cities. Dongtan was planned to rely entirely on renewable energy sources such as solar and wind power, as well as utilizing rice husks for electricity generation. The city was designed with a compact, mixed-use urban layout, featuring low-energy buildings and green spaces, meant to provide a sanctuary for migratory birds, preserve existing neighboring agricultural spaces, and promote green transportation. Additional plans included recycled water systems, reducing landfill waste, and the encouragement of sustainable industry including ecotourism, environmental education institutions, and research facilities. The project was an international collaboration between China and the United Kingdom, with a projected population of 400,000 residents by 2050.

However, construction of Dongtan never commenced, and the project was officially canceled within a few years of its announcement. The ambitious nature of the plans, particularly a proposed ban on fossil-fuel transportation, likely discouraged investors. Additionally, concerns were raised about the city's ability to generate sufficient jobs and economic self-sufficiency. The project faced further setbacks after the imprisonment of Shanghai's mayor on corruption charges, which impacted its political momentum.

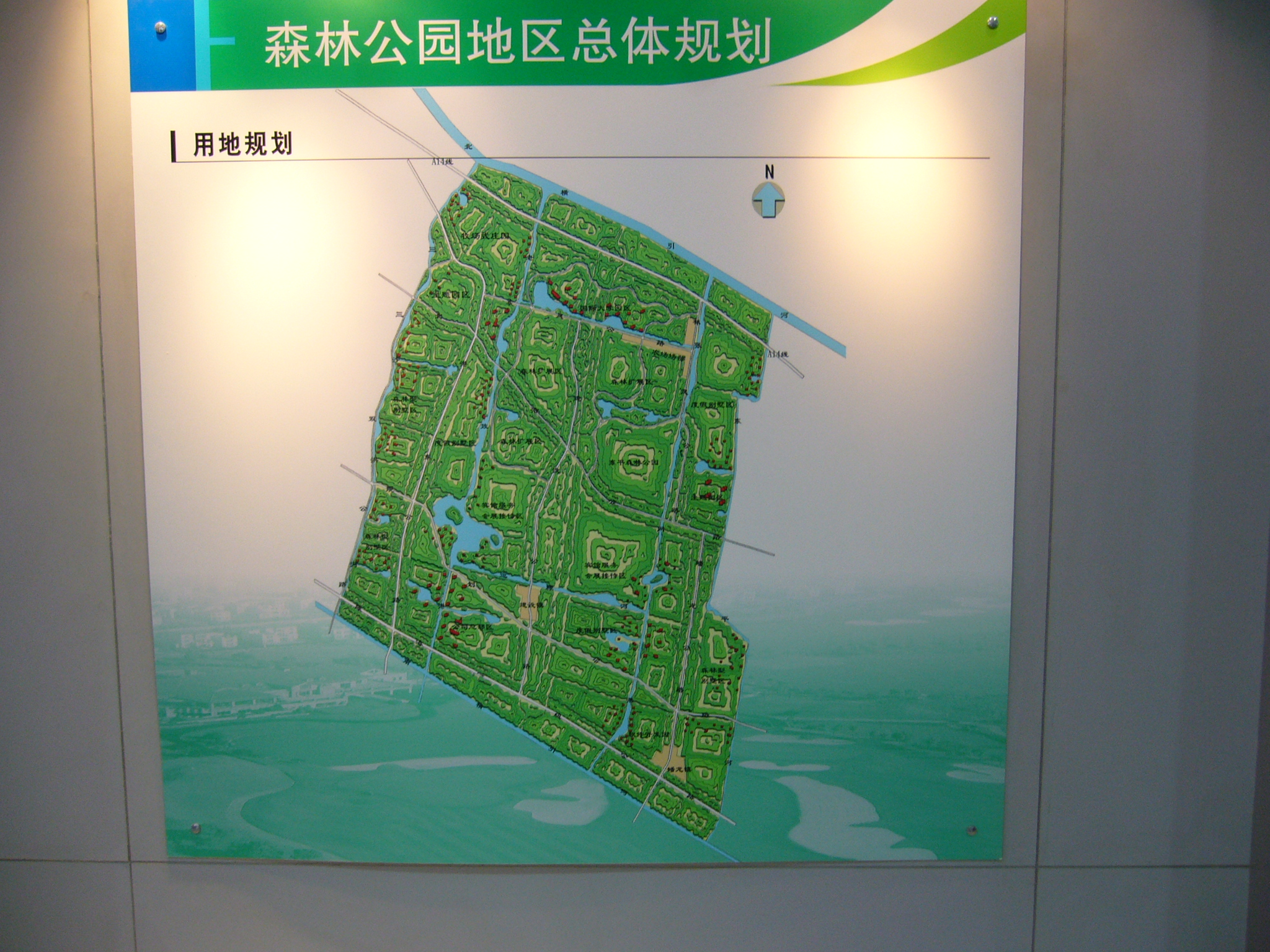
Plan of a forest park in the center of Chongming Eco-Island, part of early efforts at maintaining and adding forest cover.

=== Chongming Eco-Island ===
Even after the failure of the Dongtan eco-city, located on Chongming Island, the island as a whole began efforts to turn the entire island, as well as the two nearby islands of Changxing and Hengsha, into an eco-island, using similar plans to that of an eco-city. Some aspects of the Dongtan eco-city process were maintained, such as strengthening and expanding the native forests and wetlands, especially around where Dongtan was meant to be, though many aspects of the project differ. As an eco-island, Chongming aims to do much of what eco-cities do, reconcile urban development with green tech and ecological development, but on a larger scale. As time goes on, it moves towards further prioritizing environmental policy integration and integrating more green practices into its development, though it faces significant economic challenges as it does. It is the only project of this scale so far in China, though even at a larger scale it faces some of the same challenges of eco-city projects, like the above-mentioned economic challenges, with its development being government led and funded, or it being very close to a major urban center, Shanghai. It also faces different challenges, such as working with a large land mass with fragile, isolated ecosystems that need careful management, or preexisting populations being resistant to eco-city style changes. This project, like many of the eco-city projects within China, is still in development, though policy changes in 2018 threatened its status. Many eco-city projects, Chongming included, are difficult to accurately assess, especially since its goals are sometimes vague, so it is difficult to determine when a project is truly finished or how much progress has been made. News outlets still tout it as an eco-island, though few publications have discussed its progress in recent years.

=== Shenzhen International Low Carbon City ===
Shenzhen, also known as 'National Low Carbon Pilot City,' was originally established back in 1979 has gained a great amount of attention for multitude of reasons and has successfully become the third largest cities in China since. It has been able to reach such success as it was China's first "Special Economic Zone". This means that this city has distinct policies that push for economic growth, including the help from foreign powers. With the help and resources from the Netherlands, this city has been able to develop into one of the lowest carbon emitting cities. Through collaborative research, both countries have been able to rapidly develop the city's economy through greener integrations throughout the city and rapidly developed technology. Because of their focus on economic growth, there has been a green integration into the industry and production of energy to lower the ratio of carbon emissions to industries.

Eventually, this project attracted more international attention as other countries like the United States, Germany, France, Italy, and Australia have also joined in 2012 to push this pilot project to the heights it has achieved now, and the Netherlands move to become business partners with China in the private sector. Each of these countries had different contributions, one of these five sectors: policy and planning, knowledge transfer, research collaboration, physical development, and investment. Specifically for the United States, they focused their support through knowledge and research, by providing information communication technology and encouraging the use of research from multiple universities. These are both important contributions to transfer knowledge as the communication devices allow rapid communications about current statuses. For the Germans, they were focused on developing industries, contributing to the physical aspects of the project. French contributions were much lower in comparison with these other countries, but similar to the United States, provided research collaborations with the Chinese. Italian contributions were working in tandem with German counterparts to help plan their industrial developments through architecture firms. The last to join the contributions in this project was Australia, which focused on development. Unlike the Germans and Italians, they were focused on building education through a joint institute forming a research hub for the region.

Many of these changes are works in progress, however are very sustainable and continue to see improvement in the near future. Many of the projects come directly from the policy makers in China, and recruit help from different experts, including Sino-Dutch research teams and green collar workers. As these changes are created top-down, it has allowed a lot of policies to take effect in the city.

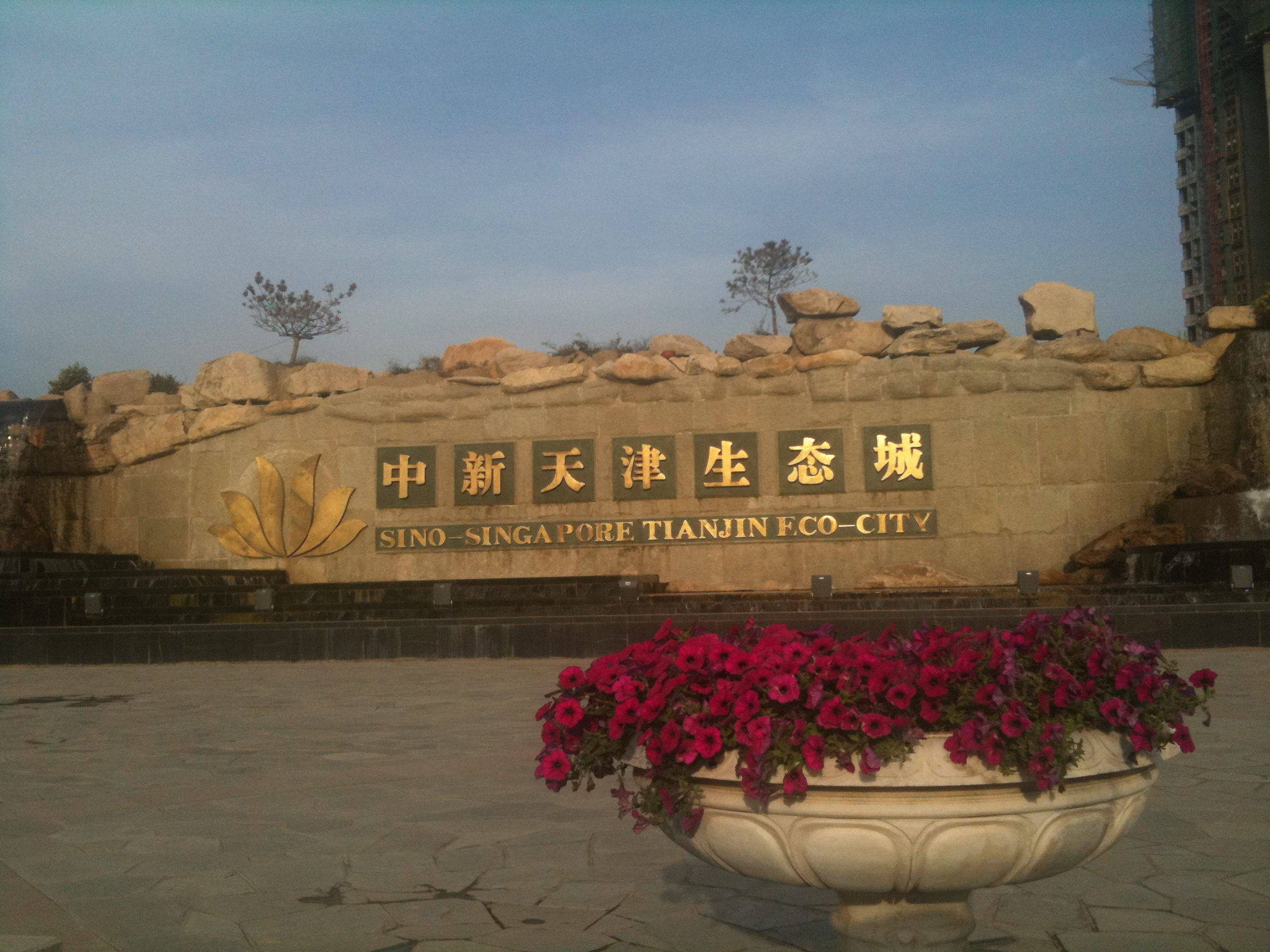
Tianjin Eco-City sign.

=== Sino-Singapore Tianjin Eco-City ===
The Tianjin eco-city is a joint venture between China and Singapore, with construction starting in 2008 and an expected completion date in the early-to-mid 2020s.

City plans incorporate 26 performance assessment factors based on Chinese, Singaporean, and international standards. Sustainable materials and building designs are utilized in the construction, and the city aims to fulfill at least 20% of its energy needs through renewable sources, recycle 60% of waste, meet half of water demand through desalination and recycled water, and reduce car usage by 90%. The location of the city was chosen as an example of ecological transformation by constructing a city that could withstand the water-related challenges in the arid region.

The Tianjin Eco-City is one of the most well-known and high-profile eco-city projects in China. It has received significant support from the central government, has been adequately funded, and is touted by the government as an example of the successful implementation of an eco-city. However, construction and population growth have fallen short of the projected targets, and there have been some criticisms questioning the city's adherence to principles of sustainability. While it was expected to accommodate 350,000 residents by 2020, as of 2017, the population had only reached 70,000. Insufficient public transportation and job opportunities have likely contributed to the lower-than anticipated growth of the city.

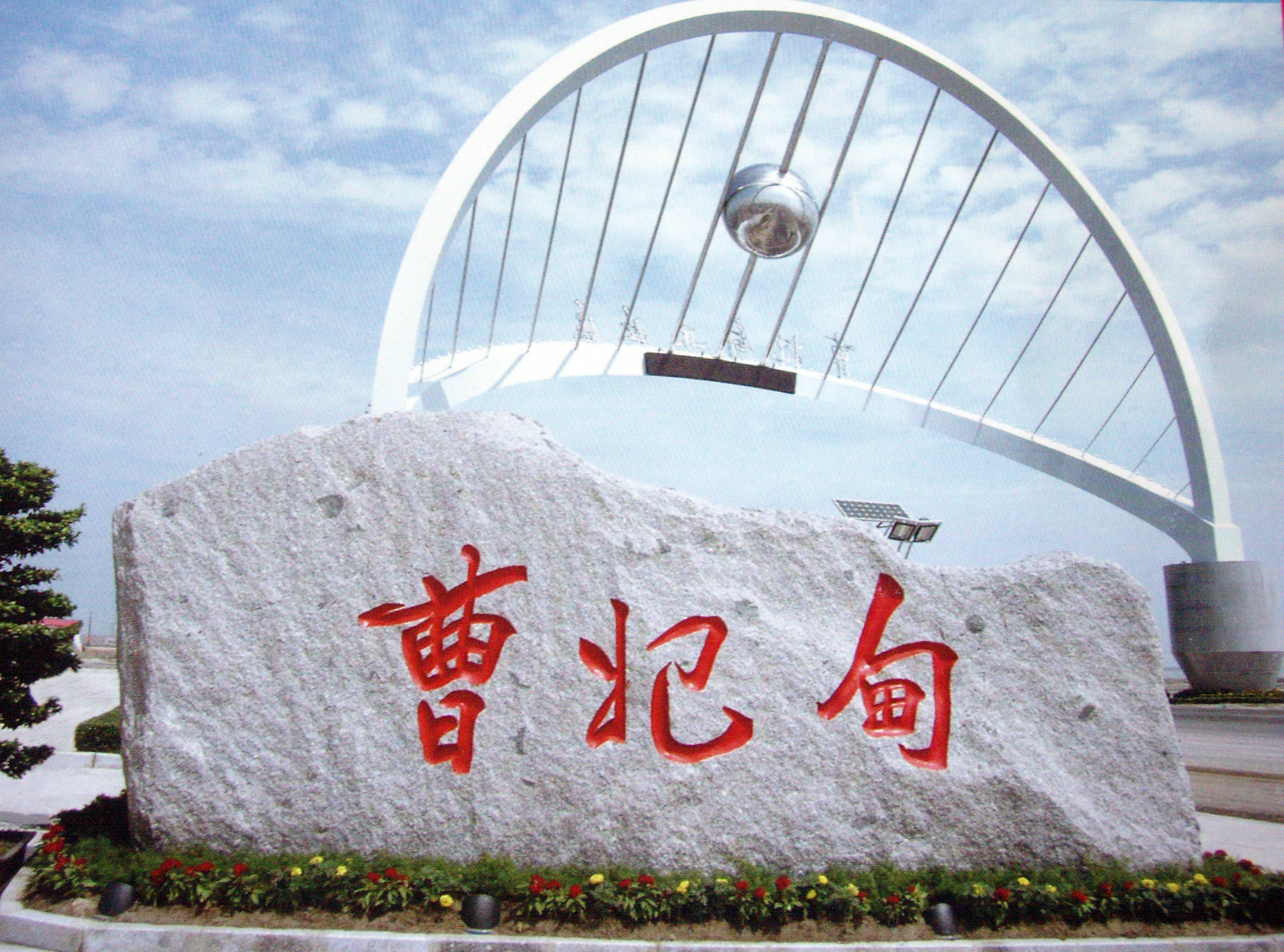
Caofeidian city sign.

=== Caofeidian Eco-City ===
The Caofeidian Eco-City, located in Tangshan, is a planned joint venture with Swedish urban design firms. The project began in 2007 with the aim of accommodating the relocation of heavy industry into the region from Beijing by providing housing for the necessary workforce and creating a circular economy to offset industrial pollution and emissions. However, the project has faced challenges in securing investment to cover high construction costs, earning the city a reputation as a "ghost city."

=== Chenggong District ===
The Chenggong District in Kunming is a development planned to incorporate low-carbon industries, renewable energy production, and green architecture and technologies. While the district was initially expected to house one million residents, it has earned a reputation as a large ghost city due to high vacancy rates and the prevalence of unfinished construction sites. However, city activity has reportedly begun to pick up in 2022.

=== Chengdu Tianfu New Area ===
The Tianfu New Area is a sustainable development initiative designed to integrate the rural agricultural areas surrounding Chengdu with the city's urban core. City plans include a reduction in carbon intensity, utilization of green energy sources, industrial pollution reduction, and recycling of sewage and waste. The area has been marketed as a "car-free city" due to the creation of a public transit network which is intended to account for half of travel, although cars are not banned. Furthermore, the Tianfu New Area is designed as a sponge city to mitigate flooding and recycle rainwater. It is expected to house 80,000 residents.

=== Other ===
- Nanhui New City
- Sino-French Wuhan Ecological Demonstration City
- Sino-Swedish Wuxi Eco-City
- Baoding low carbon city
- Xiong'an New Area
- Qingdao Sino-German Eco-Park
- Guiyang national eco civilization demonstration area, Guizhou
- Meixi Lake Eco-city, Hunan

== Efficacy and criticism ==
The scale and duration of construction in eco-city projects have left many still in development. Proponents argue that these cities are long-term investments and their success will take decades to measure. However, according to early reports from the Chinese government, carbon intensity in eco-cities has been decreasing at a faster rate than the national average.

=== Challenges ===
Several Chinese eco-cities have faced challenges in fully realizing their goals. The first planned eco-city in Dongtan was ultimately canceled, the Caofeidian Eco-City has been described as "essentially bankrupt", and the Chenggong District has been labeled a ghost city. Even the Tianjin Eco-City, which has been hailed as a success by the Chinese government, has fallen short of growth targets.

Funding has been a barrier to successful implementation for many cities. Eco-city developments typically require substantial upfront costs, making it challenging for many cities to secure the necessary capital investment. The long construction timelines, high investment costs, uncertainty about generating sufficient returns on investment to sustain the cities, and lofty plans have deterred investors, rendering some projects economically infeasible.

However, more than 250 Chinese eco-city projects remain ongoing.

Another challenge aside from finances is the governance and policies that come with these eco-cities. One of the reasons for pressure comes from the country's goal to combat the climate crisis, as their 11th Five Year Plan has caused the country to reinforce their policies to prevent more environmental damages and encourage the general population to take action in the climate crisis. The design of the government and its support also prove to be difficult as they work from a top-down perspective. The division of power of the three levels of government, from local, provincial, and national at times can render those on the bottom of the chain more powerless. The national government has the most power in diplomacy and allocates the funding and resources to the local regions to create these projects. On the other hand, the local government is more involved with their governing region and the needs of the people. However, they are not capable of handling such large projects alone and require the national government. Hence, many of these projects are proposed at the national government level, but support is very short-lived. For example, one of the first eco-cities in China, Dongtan was considered a failure for this very reason. This city started strong with the heavy support from the London-based firm of Arup and their creation of the masterplan. However, the Chinese government suspended the project launch in 2008 due to corruption of the Shanghai's previous Party Secretary, causing the political momentum to come to a stop.

In addition to said policies, there has not been significant changes in certain aspects of lowering the carbon emissions in certain cities. Under a case study of Shenzhen, the eco-city still struggles from lowering their emissions from their transportation. Carbon emissions from transportation are one of the highest contributors to the global CO_{2} levels, and Shenzhen is not an exception to this. Travel is a necessity for daily life, whether that is for work, leisure, or more. To illustrate, from 2005 to 2021, the carbon emission from the Shenzhen metro's operation alone has increased by 9.5 megatons. Many of the recommended policies are to focus on the transportation aspect and improve the energy efficiency while operating these public systems. This would then also include the access to said public transportation so more people are able to travel with these systems, and not increase the carbon emissions through personal vehicles.

The second challenge of governance is that many of these cities are a form of collaboration with foreign countries, enterprises, or other individuals, like with the Shenzhen Sino-Dutch Low Carbon city and Sino-Swedish Wuxi Eco-City. These contributions are seen through a series of resources, including funding, research, and physical resources. By providing these, there is an expectation and agreement how these resources will be utilized to complete the said goal. These international negotiations can vary in length based on the countries' priorities and the policies of implementing the project.

=== Criticism ===
==== Greenwashing ====
The funding mechanisms and government incentives associated with eco-city projects have been criticized for encouraging greenwashing. These projects often align with government economic goals, and the performance of local leaders is often evaluated based on economic growth, leading to concerns that projects prioritize economic development over environmental sustainability.

Eco-city projects have also been accused of using sustainability as a marketing tactic to secure funding. As new developments without an existing residential population or established industries, these projects have been criticized for promoting themselves as sustainable while not fully committing to more expensive and effective measures that could conflict with economic growth. The lack of a uniform standard for designating a project as an "eco-city" has been seen as enabling the use of the label as a marketing tool for real estate interests. The large number of eco-city and urbanization initiatives across the country has created competition between cities to attract residents, employers, and investments, leading to a focus on measures that maximize competitiveness rather than sustainability.

As a result, many eco-city targets have been criticized for prioritizing economic goals over environmental objectives, with eco-targets sometimes resembling the targets set for traditional cities. The construction of eco-cities has also been criticized for relying on conventional land development methods rather than adopting sustainable strategies. Some eco-cities have been accused of relying too heavily on technological fixes and green capitalism to promote economic development rather than addressing underlying social factors that inhibit sustainability.

==== Ecological harm ====
Some studies examining the environmental impact of eco-cities have criticized them for producing more harm than the benefits they confer, often prioritizing political rather than ecological considerations.

Eco-cities have been seen as symptomatic of urbanization rather than a solution, perpetuating harmful urbanization and development practices. The greenhouse gas emissions resulting from new construction have been cited as potentially offsetting the benefits of these projects, especially when compared to retrofitting existing urban spaces. In some projects, emissions from construction were not even included in performance assessments, with reviews only conducted after construction was completed.

New construction has also been associated with the creation of sparsely populated, sprawling cities that are challenging for public transportation systems to serve and decrease walkability, resulting in low adoption of sustainable transportation.

Several projects have been accused of utilizing environmentally disruptive planning. Land reclamation in certain projects has been cited as disrupting coastal ecosystems. The construction of cities like Chenzhou has faced criticism for bulldozing local mountains, while the construction of Pingliang City has been accused of polluting local ecosystems. The selection of certain locations has also been questioned, with Tianjin and Caofeidian's placement in a water-stressed region potentially exacerbating groundwater depletion, and Dongtan's proposed location potentially disrupting a sensitive wetland ecosystem.

==== Insufficiency ====
Critics argue that many eco-city developments only represent marginal improvements over existing cities. For instance, the Tianjin Eco-City's target of a 20% renewable energy mix has been criticized as only a slight improvement over national plans, which require 15% renewable energy generation by 2015. Another critique argued that the Tianjin Eco-City set such low targets that even the city of London would have exceeded city goals without any additional sustainable development required.

Additionally, the implementation of some projects have fallen short of stated sustainability goals. Some projects have been accused of prioritizing superficial changes like tree planting or the incorporation of technology that could be counterproductive to the principles of sustainability. The lack of standardized guidelines combined with implementation gaps have resulted in discrepancies between goals and outcomes. For example, the city of Tianjin was criticized for only including a single light rail line to support the city's transportation needs, despite setting a target of 90% green transportation adoption. Mandates for minimum green space have also been seen as counterintuitively reducing walkability and hindering the implementation of efficient green transportation, therefore promoting automobile use and offsetting many of the benefits of other sustainability measures. Many cities additionally lack institutional monitoring mechanisms or have no regular performance assessments.

==== Eco-enclaves ====
Chinese eco-cities have been labeled by some critics as "eco-enclaves" due to their disconnect from the surrounding areas and local conditions, often functioning as self-contained sustainability islands. The physical locations of these eco-cities often clash with the surrounding environment, where continued development of heavy industry and urbanization often outpace the benefits from eco-city construction. Many cities are situated in Special Economic Zones that encourage heavy industry and promote consumption of consumer goods. Consequently, eco-cities have been criticized for representing exceptions to the impacts of surrounding urbanization and industrialization, rather than as solutions that promote sustainability in nearby cities.

Top-down city planning has been criticized as disconnected from the realities of local conditions, disregarding the needs of future inhabitants and hindering the success of eco-city projects. City development is often led by government officials and state-owned corporations, with plans often lacking social mobilization and public participation. Performance targets often prioritize technical performance rather than considering sustainability from the perspective of city residents. Many residents may lack the motivation or technical knowledge to adopt sustainable technologies. For example, low energy prices sometimes lead residents to engage in energy-intensive activities, and the promotion of green transit in Dongtan and Tianjin has faced challenges due to the prevalence of the automobile as a status symbol in Chinese culture.

Eco-city planning often overlooks local community concerns such as affordable housing. While eco-cities are often presented as a means of supporting rural-to-urban migration, housing costs are often prohibitive for former farmers. Similarly, city locations are often selected without community input, leading to the construction of cities in inappropriate areas, resulting in empty cities that struggle to attract residents. The focus on marketability has led to the creation of expensive residential areas suitable only for elites, creating enclaves that exclude the majority of the population from benefitting. The involvement of foreign design firms has also been criticized for relying on Western building practices that may not be suitable for Chinese cities and for emphasizing Western architecture that does not incorporate Chinese aesthetics and culture.

==== Over-ambitiousness ====
It has been estimated that only one-fifth of eco-city projects meet their sustainability targets, with a high number never reaching completion. Many plans have been criticized as overly ambitious, resulting in the failure to achieve their aims or secure adequate funding. The high costs required for construction have also been seen as feasible only for the most prosperous cities capable of attracting substantial investment, making the projects impractical and non-scalable for all but the largest and richest cities.

== See also ==
- Urbanization in China
- Urban planning in China
- Urban planning in Communist countries
