= Jinxing station =

Jinxing station may refer to:

- Jinxing station (Chengdu Metro), metro station of Chengdu, Sichuan Province, China, on Line 19 of Chengdu Metro
- Jinxing station (Hangzhou Metro), metro station of Hangzhou, Zhejiang Province, China, on Line 5 of Hangzhou Metro
- Jinxing station (Kunming Metro), metro station of Kunming, Yunnan Province, China, on Line 2 of Kunming Metro
- Jinxing Road station, metro station of Changsha, Hunan Province, China, on Line 2 of the Changsha Metro
