= Luyun =

Luyun or Lüyun may refer to:

- Luyun Road station, a subway station in Yuelu District, Changsha, Hunan, China
- Chen Luyun (1977–2015), a Chinese basketball player)
- Su Lüyun (蘇綠筠), a character insinuated for Imperial Noble Consort Chunhui in Chinese television drama Ruyi's Royal Love in the Palace
- Yu Luyun
- Irene Chou (周綠雲; pinyin: Zhou Luyun; 1924–2011), a Chinese artist

== See also ==
- Cruise Terminal light rail station (Chinese: 旅運中心站; pinyin: Lǚyùn Zhōngxīn) is a light rail station of the Circular Line
