= Xiangjiang Fortune Finance Center =

Skyscraper in Changsha, Hunan, China

- 湘江财富金融中心
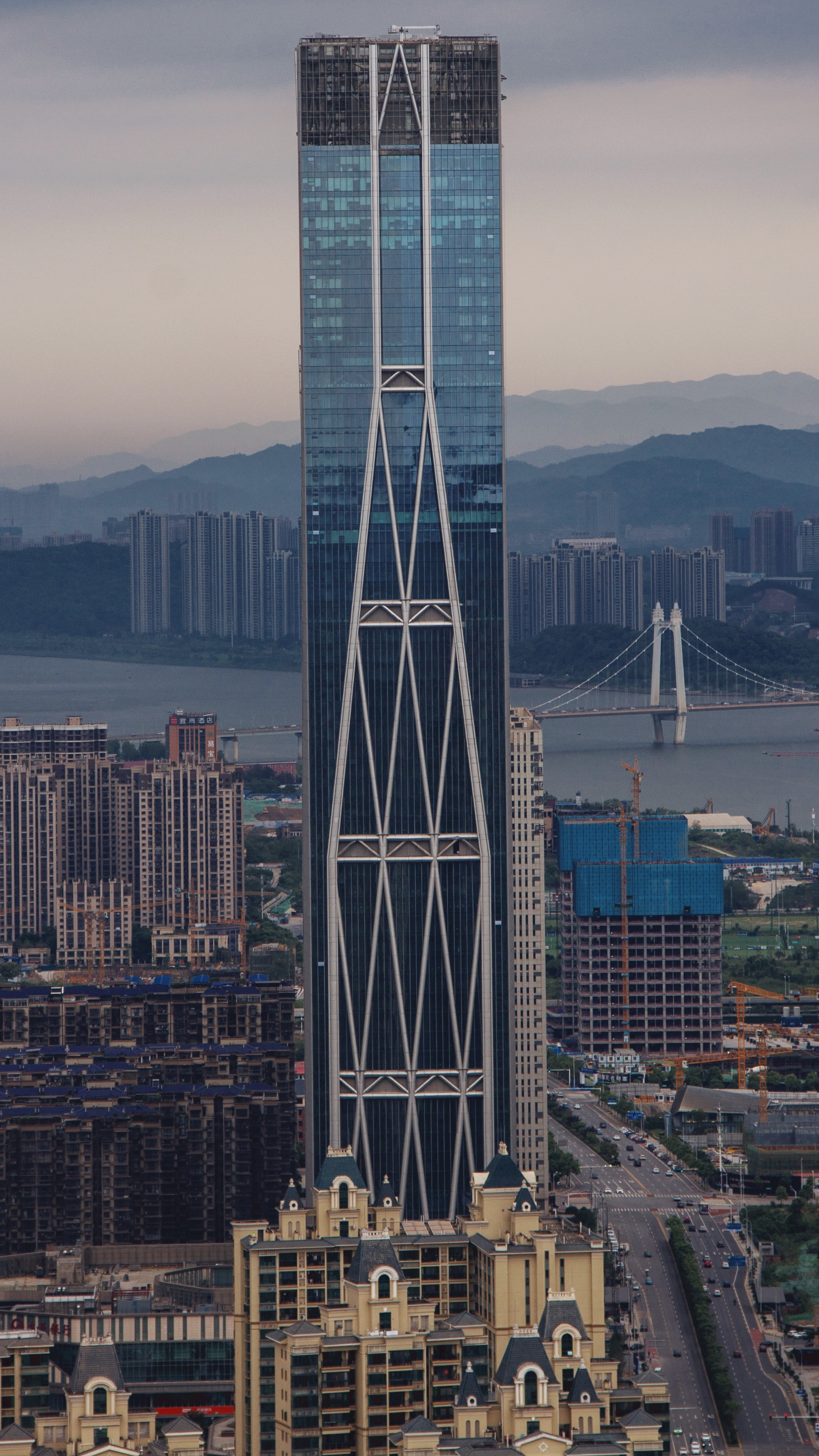
- Interactive map of the Xiangjiang Fortune Finance Center area

General information
- Status: Completed
- Type: Mixed-use, Hotel, Office, Residential
- Location: Changsha, China, 6XR4+VQ8 Xiaoxiang North Road, Yuelu District, Changsha
- Coordinates: 28.24282°N 112.95604°E
- Construction started: 2015
- Completed: 2020 (Tower 1 and 2); 2018 (Tower 3 and 4)
- Owner: Changsha Pilot Investment Holdings Group Co., Ltd.

Height
- Roof: 327 m (1,073 ft) (Tower 1); 262 m (860 ft) (Tower 2); 156 m (512 ft) (Tower 3); 149 m (489 ft) (Tower 4)

Technical details
- Structural system: Reinforced concrete
- Floor count: 65 (Tower 1); 52 (Tower 2); 38 (Tower 3); 35 (Tower 4)
- Floor area: 580,000 m^{2} (6,240,000 sq ft) (entire complex)

Design and construction
- Architect: Woods Bagot
- Developer: China State Construction Engineering

The Xiangjiang Fortune Finance Center (Chinese: 湘江财富金融中心) (also known as the Binjiang IFC) is a mixed-use building complex in Changsha, China. Built between 2015 and 2020, the complex consists of two four towers with the tallest one (Tower 1) standing at 327 m (1,073 ft) tall with 65 floors. Two of the towers serve the function of office buildings, one shares a hotel and an office building, and one serves as a residential building.

== History ==
=== Architecture ===
The complex is located in the Yuelu District of Changsha in the proximity of the Xiang River. The Tower 1 landmark which stands at 327 metres tall is the third building by height in the city. Alongside the main tower, is a smaller, but geometrically similar one which stands at 262 metres tall. The retail entry on the west is located at the center of the east–west green belt axis and faces the river, resembling the entrance to a canyon with podium walls carved to mimic erosion by a river or stream.

Among the four main towers, the Xiangjiang Fortune Finance Center also feature a Marketing Display Center. The 2,000-square-metre building complements the mixed-use development, occupying a prime location in a landscaped park. The idea for the façade was inspired by the river's flow, featuring surfaces that show the dynamic layering of the structure, along with lighting louvers suggesting motion. The building invites guests and customers to its well-organized areas, show room, workspaces, relaxation areas, exclusive rooms, bar, and outdoor green terrace and gardens. Intended for conservation, the center will eventually transition into a lasting cultural pavilion within the park.

== Buildings ==
Name	Image	Height m (ft)	Floors	Function	Ref
Tower 1		327 m (1,073 ft)	65	Office	
Tower 2		262 m (860 ft)	52	Hotel/Office	
Tower 3		156 m (512 ft)	38	Residential	
Tower 4		149 m (489 ft)	35	Office	

== See also ==
- List of tallest buildings in China
- List of tallest buildings in Changsha
