= Lucky Knot Bridge =

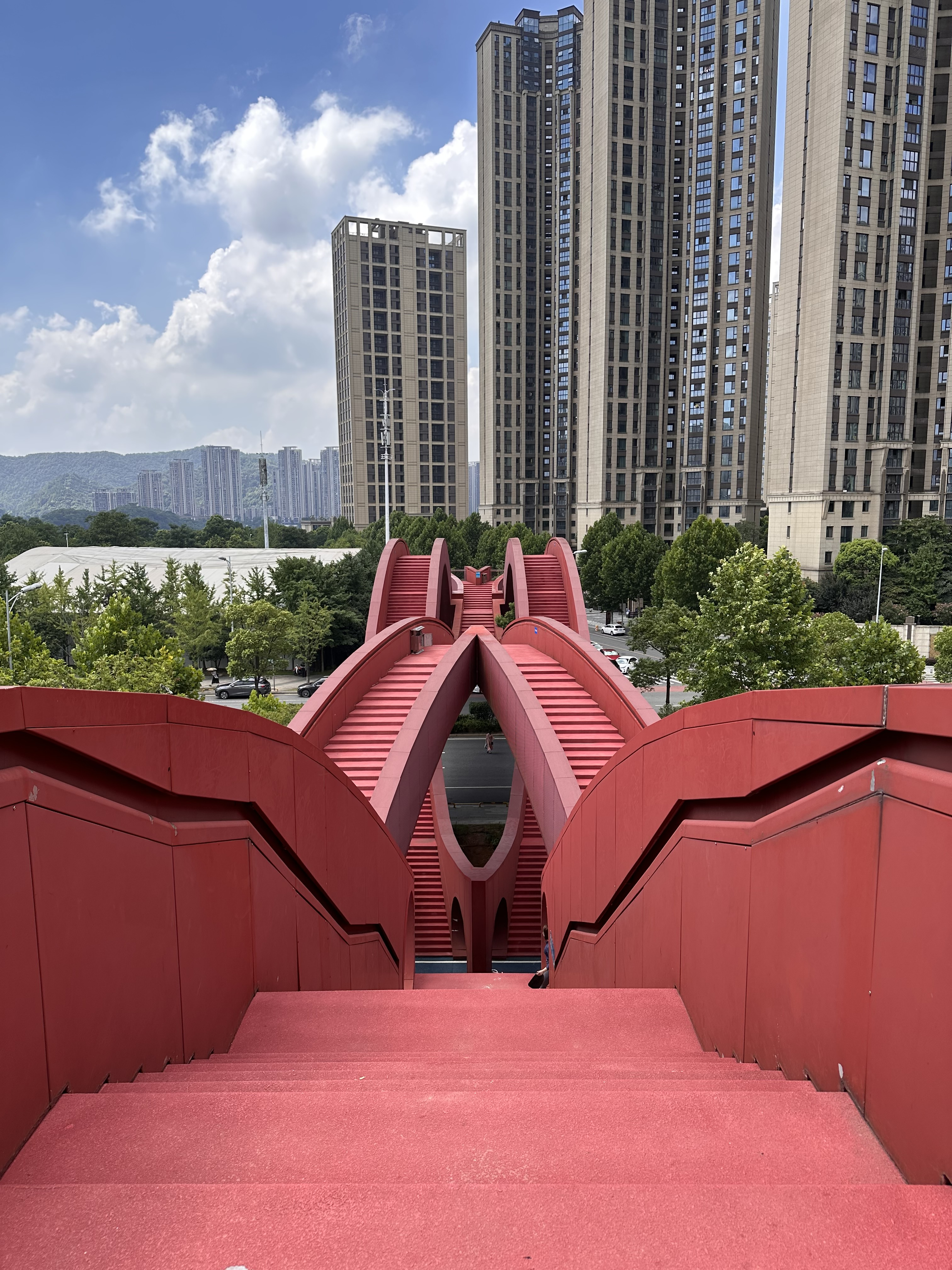
- Coordinates: 28°11′35″N 112°52′49″E
- Carries: Footbridge
- Locale: Meixi Lake District, Changsha

Characteristics
- Design: Truss
- Material: Steel
- Height: 24 m (79 ft)
- Longest span: 185 m (607 ft)

History
- Designer: Next Architects
- Construction start: 2013
- Construction end: October 2016

Location
- Interactive map of Lucky Knot Bridge

Lucky knot bridge (or knot bridge or knot footbridge) spans the Dragon King Harbor River in Meixi Lake District, Changsha, China. The 185 m long and 24 m high pedestrian truss bridge, which is bright red in colour, was designed by NEXT architects based in Amsterdam and Beijing and completed in October 2016. The bridge, which started out as a design for an international competition in 2013, was designed keeping tourist activities in mind. The design is inspired by a Möbius strip as well as Chinese knotting. However, mathematically, the bridge forms a two-sided surface, in which the top side of one of its pathways loops back to form the bottom side of the other pathway, so it is not a true Möbius strip.

External image
- NEXT Architects Lucky Knot Photography Julien Lanoo
