= Wangchengpo station =

Subway station in Changsha, China

Coordinates: 28°09′14″N 113°05′30″E

Wangchengpo (West Bus Station) 望城坡（汽车西站）
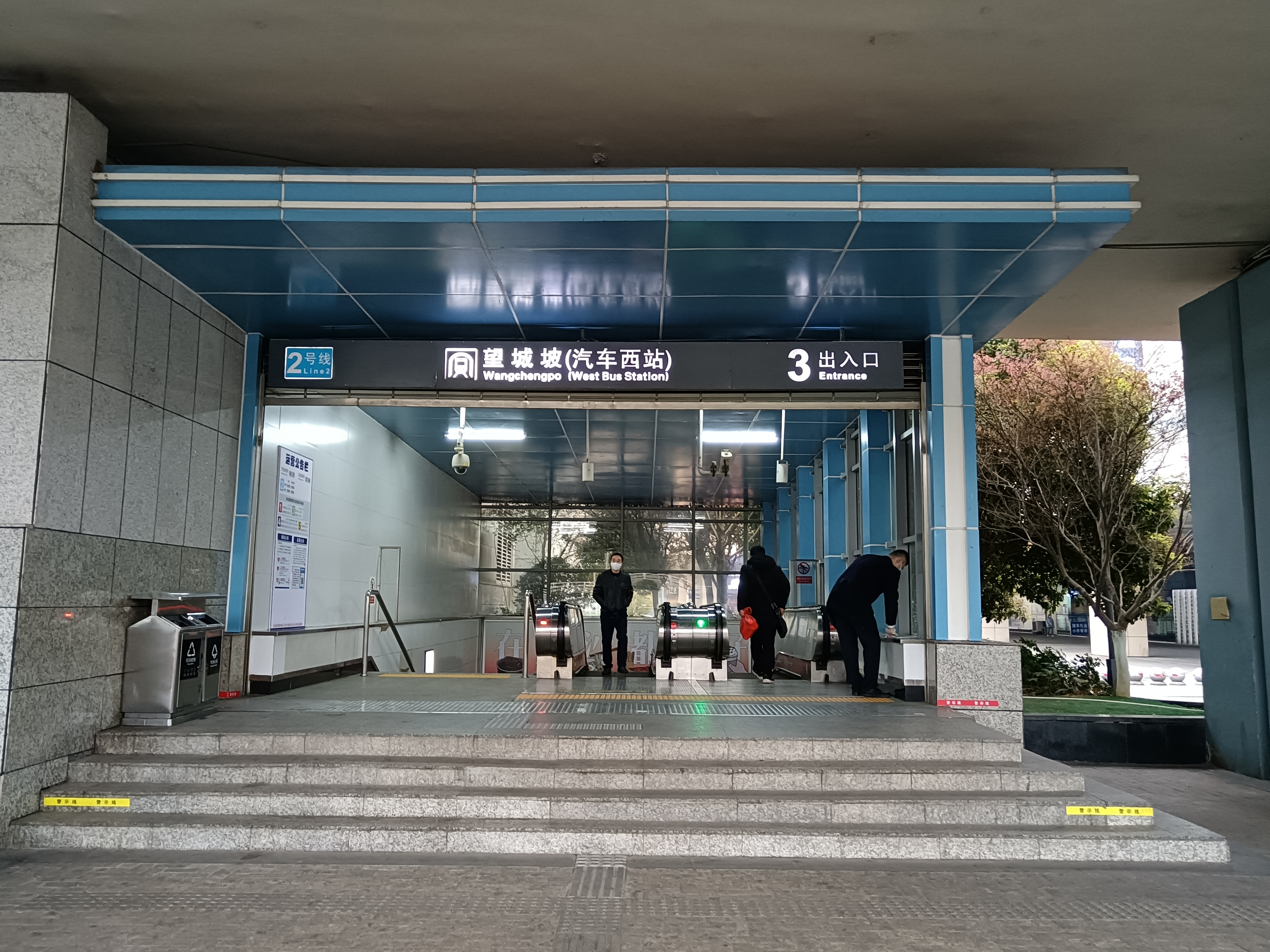
- Entrance No.3

General information
- Location: Yuelu District, Changsha, Hunan; China
- Operated by: Changsha Metro
- Line(s): Line 2
- Platforms: 1 island platform

Other information
- Station code: 205

History
- Opened: 29 April 2014

Services
Preceding station	Changsha Metro	Following station
East Meixi Lake towards West Meixi Lake	Line 2	Jinxing Road towards Guangda

Wangchengpo (West Bus Station) is a subway station in Changsha, Hunan, China, operated by the Changsha subway operator Changsha Metro.

== Station layout ==
The station has one island platform.

G		Exits
LG1	Concourse	Faregates, Station Agent
LG2	←	Line 2 towards West Meixi Lake (East Meixi Lake)
LG2	Island platform, doors open on the left
LG2		Line 2 towards Guangda (Jinxing Road)	→

== History ==
The station opened on 29 April 2014.

== Surrounding area ==
- Hunan College of Finance and Economics
- Hunan First Normal University
- Changsha West Bus Station (Chinese: 长沙汽车西站)
- Lugu Science and Technology Park (Chinese: 麓谷高新科技园)
