= East Meixi Lake station =

Metro station in Changsha, China

East Meixi Lake Station 梅溪湖东站
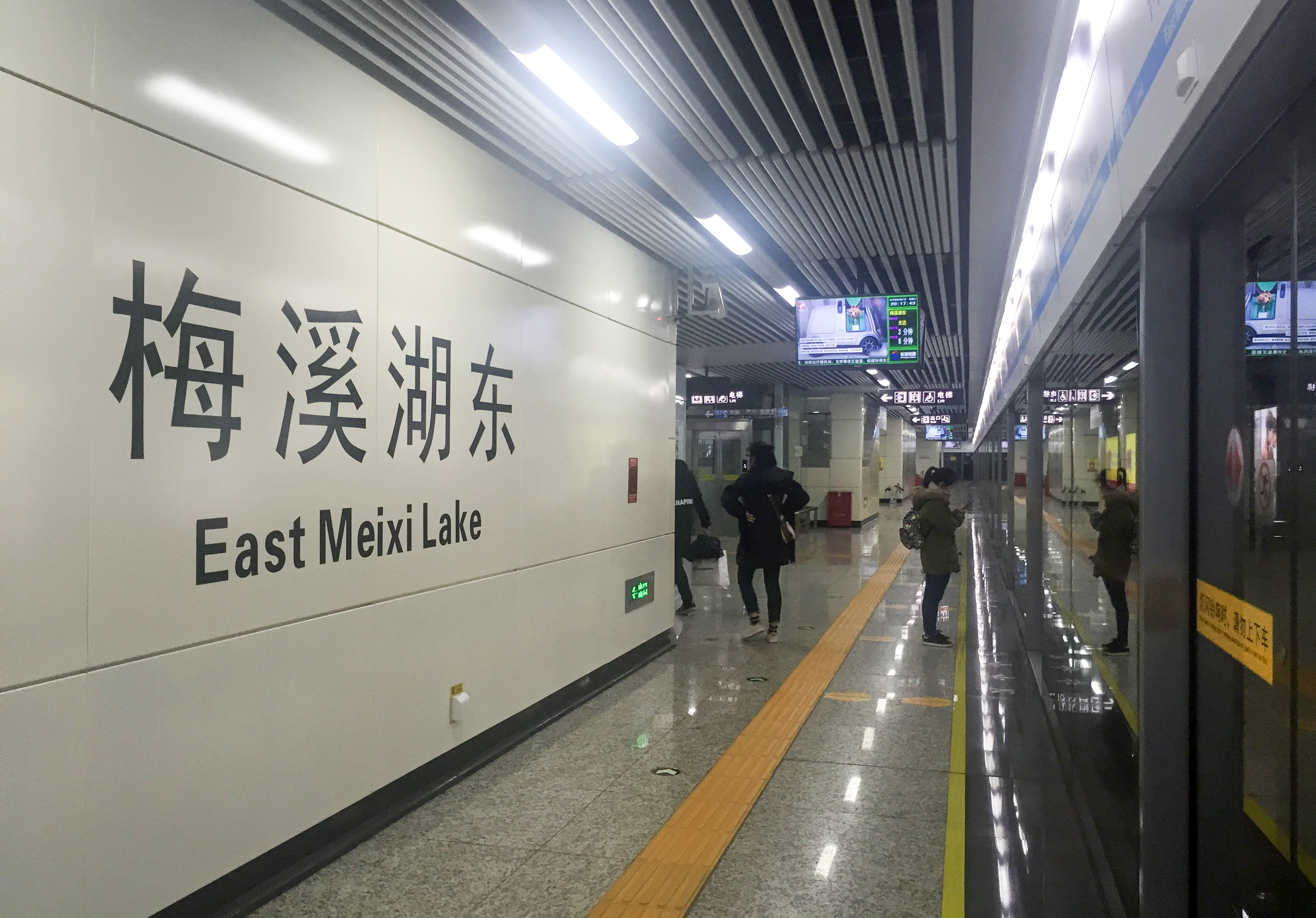

General information
- Location: Yuelu District, Changsha, Hunan; China
- Coordinates: 28°12′28″N 112°54′53″E
- Operated by: Changsha Metro
- Line: Line 2
- Platforms: 2 (1 island platform)

Other information
- Station code: 204

Services
Preceding station	Changsha Metro	Following station
Culture and Arts Center towards West Meixi Lake	Line 2	Wangchengpo towards Guangda
Location

East Meixi Lake station is a subway station in Yuelu District, Changsha, Hunan, China, operated by the Changsha subway Changsha Metro. It entered revenue service on December 28, 2015.

== History ==
The station opened on 28 December 2015.

== Layout ==
G		Exits
LG1	Concourse	Faregates, Station Agent
LG2	←	Line 2 towards West Meixi Lake (Culture and Arts Center)
LG2	Island platform, doors open on the left
LG2		Line 2 towards Guangda (Wangchengpo)	→

== Surrounding area ==
- Entrance No. 1: Babazui Community, Meixi Lake
- Entrance No. 2: Luyanghejing Village
- Entrance No. 2: Hunan Aerospace Information CO., Ltd., Yuelu School
- Entrance No. 4: International Culture and Arts Center of Meixi Lake, Meixi Lake
