= Huachuang International Plaza =

Skyscraper in Changsha, Hunan, China

- 华创国际广场
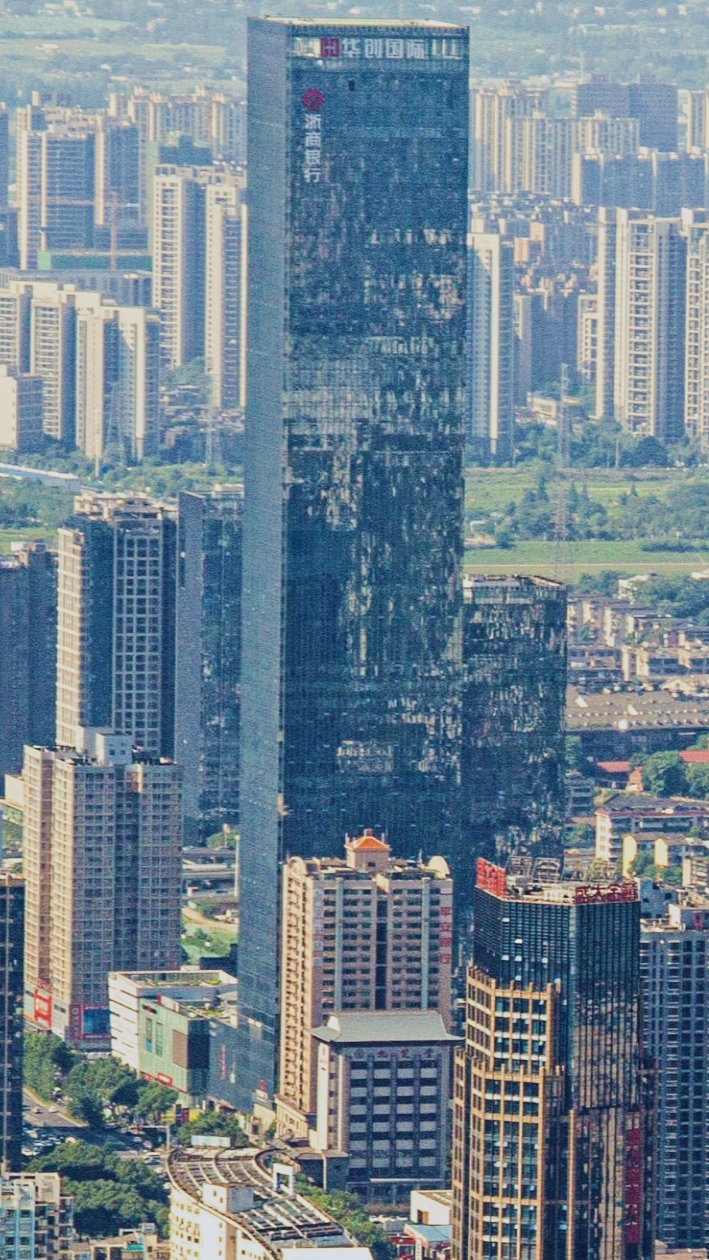
- Interactive map of the Huachuang International Plaza area

General information
- Status: Completed
- Type: Mixed-use, Office, Hotel
- Location: Changsha, China, 6XFQ+P8F Furong Middle Rd, 伍家岭商圈 Kaifu District, Changsha 410008
- Coordinates: 28.22439°N 112.98828°E
- Construction started: 2013
- Completed: 2017
- Owner: Marriott International, Inc. (Hotel)

Height
- Roof: 300 m (980 ft) (Tower 1); 140 m (460 ft) (Tower 2); 100 m (330 ft) (Tower 3)

Technical details
- Structural system: Reinforced concrete
- Floor count: 66 (Tower 1); 30 (Tower 2); 22 (Tower 3)
- Floor area: 206,200 m^{2} (2,220,000 sq ft) (entire complex)
- Lifts/elevators: Kone (elevators)

Design and construction
- Architect: Central-South Architectural Design Institute Co.
- Structural engineer: Jangho Group Co. (cladding)

The Huachuang International Plaza (Chinese: 华创国际广场) is a mixed-use building complex in Changsha, China. Built between 2013 and 2017, the complex consists of three towers with the tallest (Tower 1) standing at 300 m (980 ft) tall with 66 floors, currently the 5th tallest building in Changsha. All three towers main function is of office buildings, while Tower 1 also shares it with the hotel function.

== History ==
=== Architecture ===
The complex is situated in the Kaifu District of Changsha. The three towers are connected by a podium which is occupied by a multi-level shopping center, thus the entire complex occupies a total usable area of 206,200 m^{2} (2,220,000 sq ft). Some of the tower's tenants are China Life Insurance, Ping An Insurance, Standard Chartered, China Zheshang Bank, Deloitte, PwC, Otis Worldwide and Juneyao Air.

== See also ==
- List of tallest buildings in China
- List of tallest buildings in Changsha
