= Consumer culture of China =

Consumer culture of China refers to the emergence of social arrangements with Chinese characteristics in which the relations between lived culture and social resources are mediated through the rapid marketization of China. This type of consumption is situated in contexts experienced primarily in mainland China such as China's one-child policy.

== History ==
Consumer culture emerged in China in the final years of Qing Dynasty, when China's self-imposed autarky was gradually demolished by a series of foreign invasions. Along with western industrial capitalist enterprises came manufactured goods from the west and Japan, hence the emergence of consumer culture, Lifestyles were radically transformed when industrial products became readily available at much cheaper prices than local goods made in traditional ways. Consumerism in the late imperial and Republican eras were heavily intertwined with the process of establishing China as a nation, despite the absence of tariff tools due to China ceding its sovereignty to major world powers after substantial military failures.

The Republican era saw the establishment of commercial advertisements and brand hierarchies, especially globally famous brands. When the Chinese Communist Party (CCP) came to power in 1949, trade with foreign countries was cut or greatly reduced due to the Korean War and subsequent sanctions, leading to the diminishing of foreign brands in China, although existing users still cherished items such as Parker pens, Singer sewing machines, and numerous Swiss wristwatches, and many items still found their way to China during the Mao era in smaller quantities.

Consumerism and consumer culture did not demise during the Mao era. Brand hierarchies were replaced by a series of Chinese brands run by state-owned enterprises. During this period, forms of consumer culture altered in response to the country's political atmosphere, which emphasizes hard work and frugal living (艰苦朴素). Fetishism, or the worship of commodities, continued to exist in various forms. For instance, ownership of a wristwatch was connected to privileged social status, since watches were not only expensive but also required coupons. For women, mastery in using sewing machines was considered to be highly favorable, as being able to sew would indicate the likelihood of being a better wife. Throughout the Mao era, uneven distribution of industrial products continued to enlarge the three main social differences: urban vs. rural, industrial vs. agricultural, and intellectual vs. manual labor (三大差别) that the party claimed it would try to bridge.

After the reform and opening, China underwent drastic economic changes that fueled the emergence of a large, vibrant, and diverse commodity economy and the rise of consumer culture, including a growing interest in luxury brands. However, the rise of consumerism came with a range of negative externalities, including economic inequalities that increased as a new elite class rise through rent-seeking and privatization of state assets. Within two decades China transformed from a poor but rather economically egalitarian socialist country to a market economy in which Gini coefficients, a measure of income inequality, keep rising.

== Rise of consumerism ==
=== Late imperial and republican era ===
==== Emergence of imported goods and the disintegration of natural economy ====
Before 19th century China was largely in autarky, characterized by a self-sustainable natural economy. The Qianlong Emperor made a very famous comment on the issue when he spoke to an embassy led by George Macartney in 1793: "The celestial empire......has all kinds of exotic and valuable items as you have seen......We do not need to trade with you for anything."^{[1]} At that time China showed no interest to British goods or foreign goods in general, but the situation soon began to change in 19th century.

Industrially manufactured goods like cloth flooded into China after the Opium War due to the much lower tariff rate specified in the unequal Treaty of Nanking and the following tax agreement in 1843. Tariff for British textile range from 13.38% to 29.93% previously but were slashed to 5.56 to 6.95% after 1843.

Technological superiority is another major reason for the vast popularity of imported goods. From 1788 to 1840, costs of textile lowered for more than 90% in England, making imported cloth much cheaper than domestic products, and they were much better in quality. Imported English cloth had vivid colors and dense fiber, making them very comfortable to wear. Wide availability of imported textile gave rise to a gradual but definitive change in garment styles. Western style garments infiltrated the vast majority of China, not limited to coastal regions or large cities. Prior to 1894, garments in China mostly retained their traditional forms and design, but gradual change began to take place as foreign materials became readily available, contact with foreigners increased, and importers started to work more on promoting their products.

So were foreign utensils. Mechanically produced safety matches, referred to as "foreign fire" by Chinese users, were easier to use than traditional fire-making tools and soon replaced the traditional lifestyle of making fire. Imported kerosene also replaced peanut oil in daily illumination as they were brighter and cheaper. Kerosene became widely used by Chinese households starting from 1880s as they were imported to China in bulk. In 1887 kerosene make up 1.3% of the total value of imported goods, in 1894 it was already 4.9%, more than tripled in seven years. In terms of volume, it was 23 million gallons in 1886, and tripled to 69 million gallons in 1894, also tripled.

This can be seen in the evolution of new words containing "foreign" (洋). Famous reformist writer and thinker Zheng Guanying listed around 50 words that contain "foreign" in his famous 1893 book Words of Warning to a Prosperous Age, all of them point to an imported product. The popularity of "foreign" containing words suggest people have been very familiar with imported products, if not all of them had experienced the goods.

Better quality/performance and relative cheap price soon made imported goods vastly popular especially in coastal regions of China after 1870s. Before the consumption of imported goods were limited to rich people in coastal regions, but as traffic infrastructure improves over time, imported goods spread to more remote areas, even in the countryside, rendering traditional handcrafts useless. As of 1936, only 24.4% peasants still weave their own cloth.

==== New forms of commerce ====
Came with new products were new forms of commerce, like advertisements and department stores. The popularity of imported goods is also partly due to meticulous marketing techniques adopted by manufacturers and importers. Importers of foreign goods made good use of advertisements, as the newspapers and magazines sprouted after 1895. From 1898 to 1912, the number of Chinese newspapers and magazines skyrocketed from approximately 100 to more than 500. Including those have demised, the number would be from 700 to 800. As of 1913, 51 million copies of newspapers and magazines had been shipped.

Approximately 60% to 70% of all the newspaper advertisements belonged to foreign companies or their agents. In larger cities like Shanghai, Tianjin, Wuhan and Guangzhou (Canton), outdoor billboards are also very common. As of 1934, there are more than 4000 square meters of billboards in Shanghai. Sometimes there were also promotion teams wielding advertisements on the street, giving out small samples of products or merchandises like calendars, posters or diaries.

A revolution in retailing, department stores appeared in western Europe and North America in late 19th century and made their way to large cities in China shortly afterwards, bringing into China new forms of consumerism. Traditional retail modes emphasize specialization and letting customers find items they need as quickly as possible, viewing shopping as a must-do chore that should be finished quickly. Department stores are built around exactly opposite philosophy. They are dedicated to make shopping become an experience by itself through carefully arranging the shopping space in a way that picking items offer an all-around sensory stimulation. Department stores also became pioneers in employing advanced technology like elevators and air conditioning to create a modern and comfortable shopping environment.

Shanghai, with its large numbers of rich or middle-class people and convenient transportation, was the most notable place in nurturing new consumption forms. From 1920 to 1949, at least 82 shopping sites in Shanghai identify themselves as department stores. They came in various sizes, having one feature in common: they sell a wide range of products. It is worth noting that some specialized dealerships like Chinese Underwear (中国内衣) and Yongsheng Children's Clothing (永生童装) also call themselves department stores, but this suggests the name "department store" itself was considered new, fashionable and sought after. Among them four were the most prominent: Xianshi (先施), Yongan (永安), Xinxin (新新) and Daxin (大新), together they were referred to as the "Four Majors" (四大). Most department stores located on the Nanking Road, at the core of the International Settlement, where traffic is dense. The erection of department stores also established the area's figure as modern and luxurious, as department stores provide goods and services that are usually associated with "modernity", like timepieces, glasses, cigarettes and jewelry while driving "traditional" businesses like catering, bath houses and home improvements out of the area. In this way, department stores not only redefined consumption, but also reshaped Shanghai's landscape and powered a surge in consumption.

==== Consumption and ideology ====
Imported goods flooding into China also gave rise to new thoughts, the most notable being worries and bitterness towards China's lack of industrial power. People began to increasingly define their own identities through consuming branded commodities, those concerns evolved into a prolonged political movement in 1930s, dedicated to establishing China as a nation state. Commonly referred to as the National Products Movement (国货运动), it is a series of loosely connected thoughts that divides products into "national" and "foreign", thus promoting, sometimes coercing consumers to buy "national goods". Consumption of national goods were considered to be beneficial to the country, while foreign goods were considered to be hostiles and should be boycotted.

Many influential figures have been avid promoters of national products. From government officials to famous writers to industrialists, people wrote in militant and provocative languages to portray foreign goods and those who sell them as invaders, while national goods were pivotal to the country's survival from the perspective of promoting capital growth. One quintessential example is Yu Dafu, a famous writer and poet, who wrote in his article On the Usage of National Goods (关于使用国货) in 1936: "Unless you are in urgent need of something that is only made available by foreign manufacturers, like books and stationeries, otherwise you should use national goods as long as they are available." He also pointed out he saved a fortune through buying brushes and Chinese crude paper instead of western stationeries.

Views on national goods often contain a gendered perspective. Urban women and students used to spend a significant amount on imported cosmetics and garments, but ubiquitous propaganda, sensations of nationalism and public opinion pressure soon led to women being major advocates of national goods. Women organizations also provided convenience for buying national goods. Shanghai Women's Association (上海妇女会) established the Women's National Goods Consumption Union (妇女国货消费合作社), making national goods available at cheaper prices and more places. Actresses and female singers like Hu Die would actively endorse national goods and personally buy them to promote their popularity.

Despite comprehensive efforts from various parties, the elevation of Japanese invasion in 1937 interrupted Chinese plans to promote national goods and industrial capitalism.

=== China in the Mao era ===
Conventional ideas usually perceive Mao era as being frugal and anti-capitalism, but consumerism have survived the Mao era in various forms, despite CPC claimed to eliminate capitalism and establish an egalitarian socialist country. Core processes of consumerism that emerged before Mao era—mass production of commodities, promotion through mass media, and creating identities through commodities, have continued in Mao era and expanded as a side effect of CPC's industrialization goals. The state exerted comprehensive control over industrial production, corresponding with planned allocation of manufactured goods. Prioritizing accumulation of industrial capital, the state suppressed individual desires on consumption, or channeled individual consumption to where the state considers "beneficial to the society". Theoretically the state controls who gets what, but in reality, this is impossible, as the state gives out contradictory signals about consumption. The best example of this kind of contradiction is embodied by the manufacturing and distribution of three major luxury items known as the "big three" (三大件): sewing machine, wristwatch and bicycle.

Before late 1950s the "big three" are very hard to get in China, their use was limited to rich families as they were mainly produced by foreign companies. But as the country's industry recovers from prolonged warfare and increased state control on economy, the big three became more and more available, even in remote areas. Production of the big three expanded dramatically in later years of the Mao era, satisfying many peoples' desires to own them. Taking wristwatches as an example, in 1968 annual watch production in Shanghai exceeded 1 million for the first time, doubled to 2.28 million in just 2 years in 1970. At the same time, the state's policies and narrative about consumption changed from promoting frugalism to encouraging consumption. As "the big three" become increasingly popular in China, they have lost their initial elite status, and eventually replaced by the "new big three" after the reform and opening: television, refrigerator and washing machine.

== Setbacks of the growth of consumerism ==
=== Extreme markets ===
The rise of consumerism and production in China that began after the economic changes led to the reemergence of markets that existed before the communist era in China and the rise of extreme markets in China.

These extreme markets would include wet markets that sell wild animals for consumption, and well as underground sex shops. The introduction of extreme markets in China would emerge soon after the end of the Cultural Revolution in China and economic reforms started being made that would advance consumer culture in Chinese society. During the Mao Era, most markets were eliminated, and it was extremely difficult for the Chinese population to buy necessities for themselves in order to survive. These extreme markets show the negative consequences of consumer culture's rise in China, as these markets have reached the point where they can no longer be controlled by the Chinese government, despite many efforts being made to do so. Due to the lack of regulation from the government, these markets would sell the services of wet nurses, sex workers, human organs, illegal drugs, young brides and even children. They would lead to the rise of human trafficking becoming a more common occurrence in the country, the adoption created a new consumer market in China, wet markets causing harm to the environment, and the rise of the sexual awakening in China. The rise of extreme markets in China is also a symbol that mass consumerism and consumer culture in China is now seemingly out of control.

==== Wet markets ====
During the last decade of the Mao Era, around 36 million people in the Chinese population died from famine. However, after Deng Xiaoping started to make economic reforms in order to reduce famines, Chinese farmers were to privately grow and produce their own source of food, and were allowed to directly sell their products to consumers. As the state no longer controlled food production and set fixed prices on products, this led to agricultural production and consumption in China increased rapidly. However, many farmers chose to hunt wildlife in order to provide for themselves and sell, and this led to the rise of wet markets in China. Often, these wild animals would be kept in poor conditions and caged close to one another. The transfer of diseases from animals to one another would become quite common as a result due to these poor regulations in these wet markets. These wet markets would also create damage to the environment and ecosystem as many endangered animals who were already at risk of being extinct were now being sold off for consumption. Rising incomes as a result of the new economic reforms, that allowed for more people to purchase rare animals in these wet markets. The consumption of these endangered animals in banquets was portrayed as a symbol of wealth and luxury, a lifestyle that was valued highly in China's new consumer culture. Many who also consumed the meat of these endangered animals may believe in superstitions where the consumption of these animals' meat would enhance certain behavior. Animals from all around the world, not just local Chinese wildlife, such as the Bengal Tiger, Asian leopards, lynx, otters, pangolin, bears, turtles, and Brazilian lizards are a few examples of animals that are sold at these markets. Smuggling rings started to transfer the skin and meat of these animals to wet markets despite the Chinese government's effort to reduce the number of endangered animals sold at these markets. These smuggling rings will extend from China to regions all the way in South America. Over 5000 different endangered animals have been found to be sold in these smuggling rings. The Wildlife Protection Law that was passed in 1989 is one example of the Chinese government trying to regulate extreme markets like the wet market, however failed. This law made it illegal to buy or consume animals that were internationally protected and endangered, but consumption still continued. This has contributed to many animals like Tigers and Himalayan black bears almost going extinct due to excessive Chinese consumption. Due to these markets and the poor conditions animals face, China is met with international pressure from animal rights groups and European Parliament.

==== Human trafficking ====
The women and children sold in these extreme markets are victims of human trafficking that has become a common occurrence in China. Many children who are left unsupervised for a short period of time are at risk of being kidnapped and sold in these extreme markets, even if they are in their own homes. Many parents who are victims of having their children go missing often have to make organizations among themselves in order to find their children. Many parents who have reported their child's disappearance to the authorities or even government officials.

=== Negative impacts on the environment ===
The rise of consumerism in China has helped boost the market and raise China's economy but has played a part in severe damage to the environment and air pollution in China and the rest of the world. During the Mao Era, being wasteful was heavily looked down upon and it was encouraged that the Chinese population be frugal with their belonging. Personal consumption was heavily looked down upon and people often reused their personal belongings due to the mass amount of poverty that plagued China during the Mao Era. The Chinese population also had to deal with a scarce amount of products being available to purchase. By the 1990s however, people were free to easily deposit and buy as much goods and products as they pleased as the emergence of a wider variety of products due to higher production rates within China. However, the rise of consumer culture has led to the rise of wasteful habits as well as pollution. For example, by the 1990s, chopsticks were given out to be used and disposed off frequently. While this seems like a minor change in Chinese society, the easy disposal of chopsticks millions of trees being cut down to produce these disposable chopsticks that are handed out every day in China. However, disposable products instead of reusable ones became a symbol of a civilized lifestyle, particularly by China's middle class that could afford this behavior. Many food markets and eating establishments have been switching to disposable products like chopsticks since the 1980s. Also, due to economic changes introduced back in the end of the 1970s, the Chinese population has grown accustomed to eating large proportions of food, especially meat. The consumption of meat was now considered in Chinese society to be a symbol of luxury, which was life that many people in China desired to have and showcase to their peers. Meat like beef, pork, and chicken is extremely common in almost every Chinese meal today, and this results in an increasing amount of livestock to be raised for future consumption. Due to constant grazing, many areas that were one grassland have turned to deserts in China with nearly a million acres of land in China being turned to a desert. This allows for more loose soil and dust to be picked up by the wind and travel around in the air, causing more population.

Also the rise of production has led to high releases of carbon emissions in the air as many factories spread across China burn fossil fuels like coal in order to produce goods to satisfy the growing demand of products by consumers in China and around the world. The buildup of carbon emission in the air contributes to the Green House effect in the Earth's lower atmosphere layer and ozone layer as carbon is a heat trapping gas. By the year 2018, China was known to be the largest producer of heat trapping emission in the world, with carbon emissions from the country exceeding emissions from the United States and Europe combined. China also burned the most coal in industrial production, as well as everyday uses like cooking or heating than the rest of the world's use combined, as well as recorded to have used about 2.8 billion tons of coal being used in 2008. The burning of coal takes up around 68.7% of the country's total energy consumption. The rise of pollution has also led to heavy smog to pollute cities constantly and make the air quality in China almost insufferable to deal with. Around 64 people in China die each day due to poor air quality and thousands of people in the population die from premature deaths each year due to heavy toxic gases polluting the air in urban areas. The burning of coal in heavy production and other human activity in China also resulted in a mass amount of sulfur dioxide gas, methane, nitrous oxide, and fluorinated gases released into the air. The increasing amount of sulfur dioxide gas in the air has resulted in multiple cases of acid rain to occur in China.
