= Meixi Lake Park =

Park in Changsha, China

- 梅溪湖公园
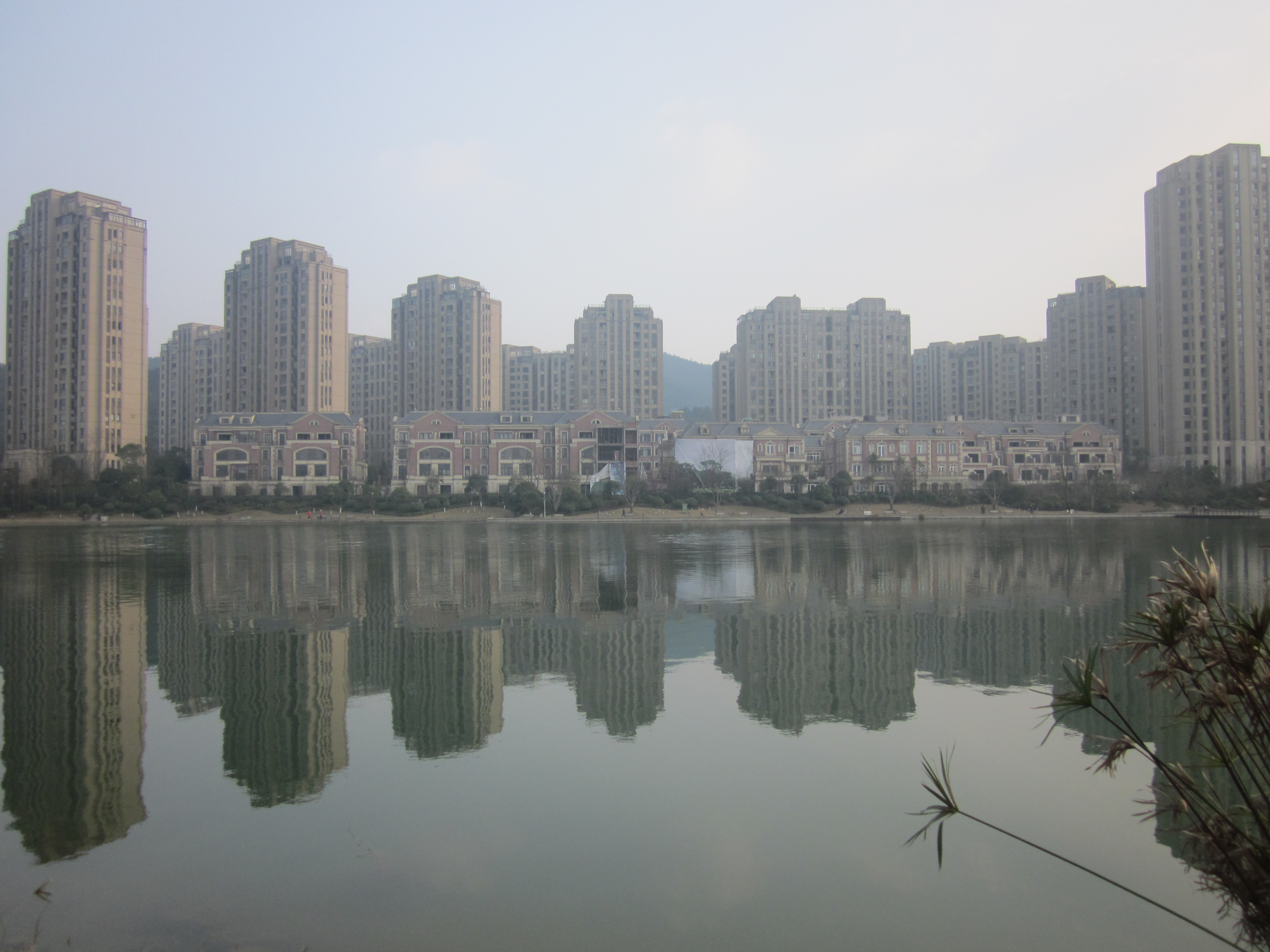
- Buildings near the Meixi Lake.

- Location within Hunan Location within China
- Type: Public park, urban park
- Location: Yuelu District, Changsha, Hunan, China
- Coordinates: 28°11′37″N 112°54′13″E
- Area: 14.8-square-kilometre (5.7 sq mi)
- Created: 2012
- Operator: Changsha government
- Status: Open all year

Meixi Lake Park (simplified Chinese: 梅溪湖公园; traditional Chinese: 梅溪湖公園; pinyin: Meíxīhú Gōngyuán) is a public, urban park in Yuelu District of Changsha, Hunan, China. Covering an area of 14.8 square kilometres (5.7 sq mi), the park was established in 2012 and opened to the public in 2016. Meixi Lake Park is bordered by West Fenglin Road (枫林西路) on the North, Third Ring Road (三环线) on the West, Taohualing scenery spot (桃花岭景区) on the South, and West Second Ring Road (西二环) on the East. It is a multifunctional botanical garden integrating recreation, physical activities, plant species collection and display as well as tourism.

== Tourist attractions ==
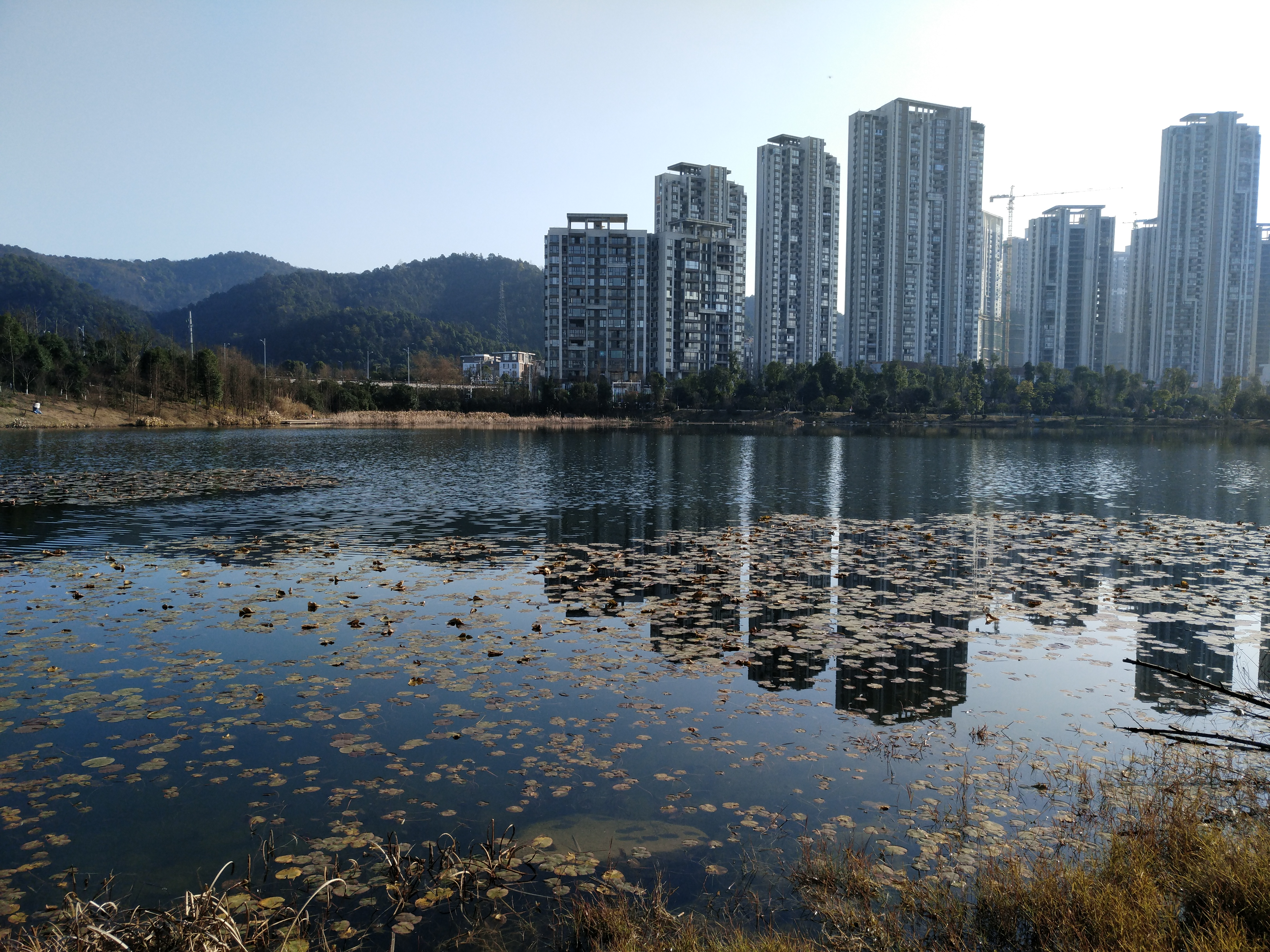
Leaves floating on the Meixi Lake.

The Meixi Lake Park is divided into several scenic areas, including Taohualing scenery spot, Meixi Lake, International Culture and Arts Center, Changsha Children's Playground, Peach Islet, Jieqing Islet, Ginkgo Park, and Waxberry Park.

=== Meixi Lake ===
The Meixi lake (梅溪湖) is 5.5 km (3.4 mi) long and its surface area is 18.05 km^{2} (6.97 sq mi).

=== Jieqing Islet ===
The Jieqing Islet (节庆岛) is 900 m (3,000 ft) long and 90 m (300 ft) wide, covering an area of 83,000 m^{2} (890,000 sq ft).

=== Peach Islet ===
The Peach Islet (桃花岛) also known as Cultural Islet (文化岛), is located in the north of Meixi Lake. The name comes from the peach trees which planted on the islet. Its area is 15,000 m^{2} (160,000 sq ft).

=== International Culture and Arts Center ===
The International Culture and Arts Center (国际文化艺术中心) covers 100,000 square metres (1,100,000 sq ft), with a building area of 120,000 square metres (1,300,000 sq ft), consists of a Grand Theatre and an Art Gallery.

=== Tanying Lake ===
The Tanying Lake (潭影湖) is renovated from Hongsi'an Reservoir (洪寺庵水库). Its surface area is 133,333.3 m^{2} (1,435,188 sq ft).

=== Ginkgo Park ===
The Ginkgo Park (银杏公园) also known as Sports Park (体育公园), is located in the north of Meixi Lake and has an area of 45,000 square metres (480,000 sq ft). It serves multiple functions, including recreation, physical activities and tourism.

=== Waxberry Park ===
The Waxberry Park takes its name from the park's arbutus. It is bordered by Lusong Road (麓松路) on the West, Xiuchuan Road (秀川路) on the North, and Xiaohe Road (肖河路) on the Southeast. Its area is 27,000 m^{2} (290,000 sq ft).

=== Chinese Knot Footbridge ===
The Chinese Knot Footbridge (中国结步行桥) was completed in May 2015, which is a joint design by John van de Water and Jiang Xiaofei. The Chinese Knot Footbridge stretches 183.95 m (603.5 ft), at a height of 20.425 m (67.01 ft) above water. In 2013 it was rated as one of the world's 10 "sexiest" footbridges by CNN for its sinuous design.

== Transportation ==
- Take subway Line 2 to get off at West Meixi Lake station, Luyun Road station, Culture and Arts Center station or East Meixi Lake station.
