= Luyun Road station =

Metro station in Changsha, China

Luyun Road Station 麓云路站
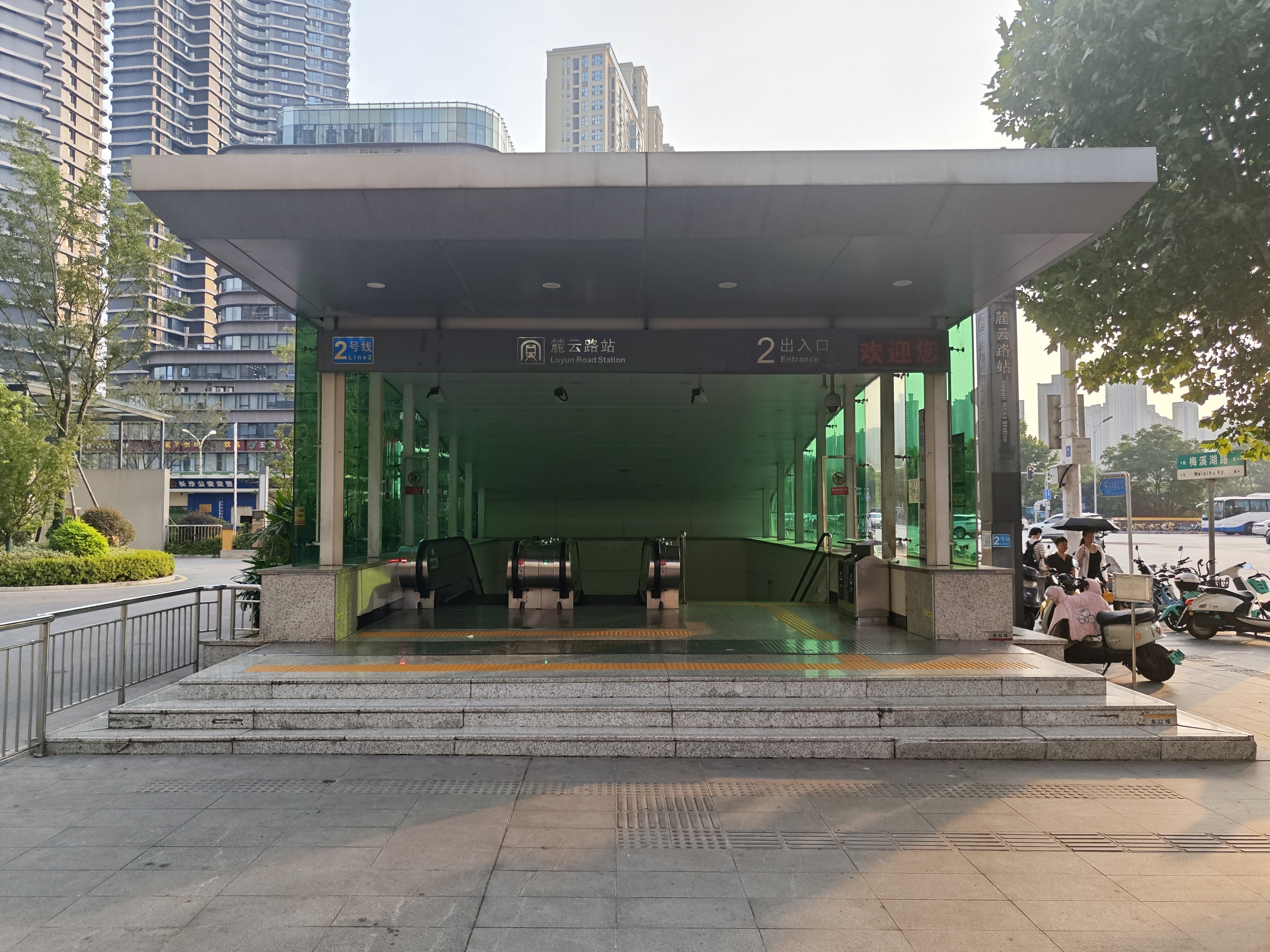
- Entrance No. 2 of Luyun Road Station

General information
- Location: Yuelu District, Changsha, Hunan; China
- Coordinates: 28°11′48″N 112°53′56″E
- Operated by: Changsha Metro
- Line: Line 2
- Platforms: 2 (1 island platform)

Other information
- Station code: 202

Services
Preceding station	Changsha Metro	Following station
West Meixi Lake Terminus	Line 2	Culture and Arts Center towards Guangda
Location

Luyun Road station is a subway station in Yuelu District, Changsha, Hunan, China, operated by the Changsha subway operator Changsha Metro. It entered revenue service on December 28, 2015.

== History ==
The station opened on 28 December 2015.

== Layout ==
G		Exits
LG1	Concourse	Faregates, Station Agent
LG2	←	Line 2 towards West Meixi Lake (Terminus)
LG2	Island platform, doors open on the left
LG2		Line 2 towards Guangda (Culture and Arts Center)	→

== Surrounding area ==
- Entrance No. 1 and No. 2: Meixi Lake
- Entrance No. 3: Baijiatang, Jinmaoyue
