= Culture and Arts Center station (Changsha Metro) =

Metro station in Changsha, China

Culture and Arts Center Station 文化艺术中心站
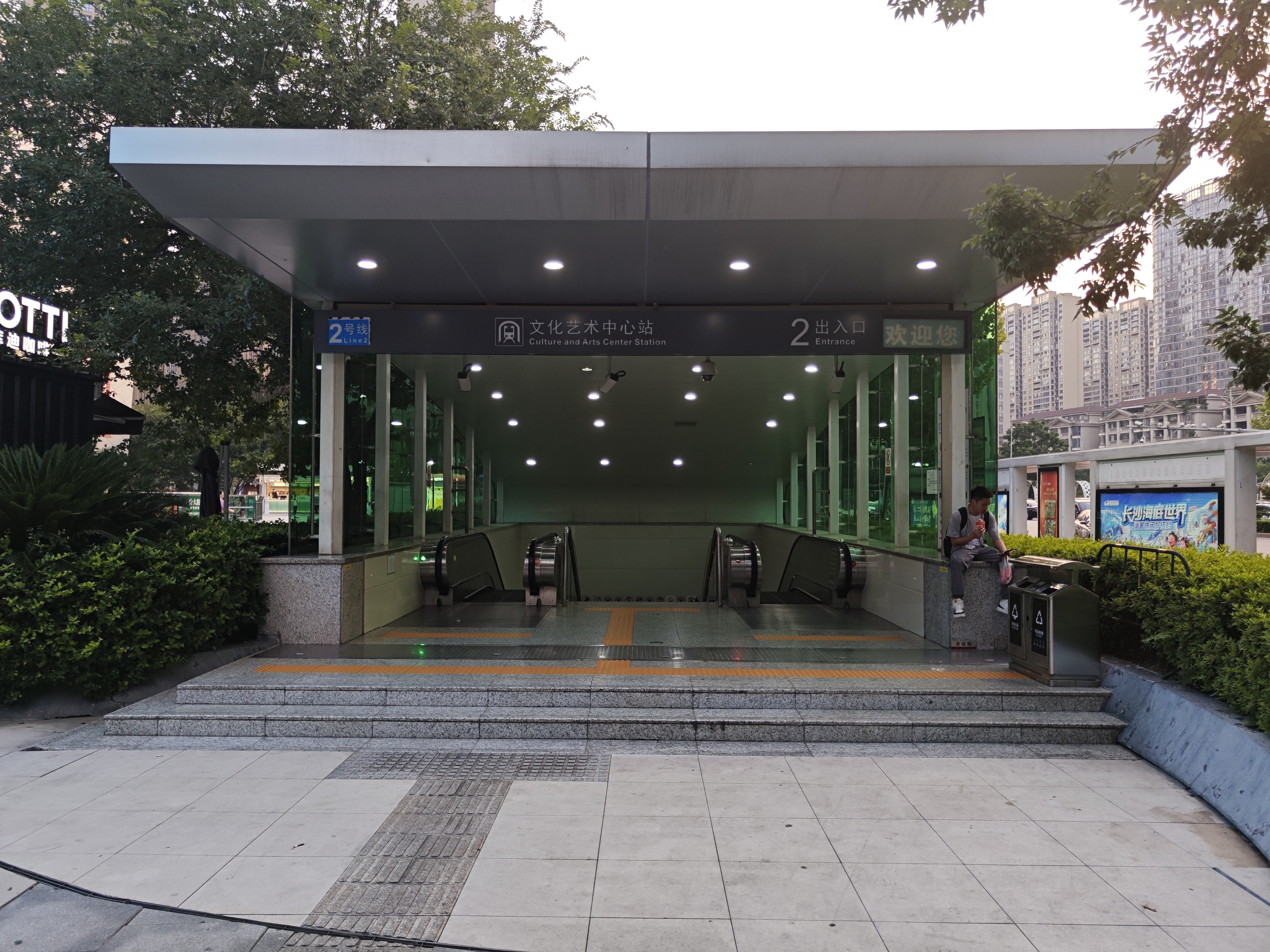
- Entrance No. 2 of Culture and Arts Center Station

General information
- Location: Yuelu District, Changsha, Hunan; China
- Coordinates: 28°12′10″N 112°54′25″E
- Operated by: Changsha Metro
- Line: Line 2
- Platforms: 2 (1 island platform)

Other information
- Station code: 203

Services
Preceding station	Changsha Metro	Following station
Luyun Road towards West Meixi Lake	Line 2	East Meixi Lake towards Guangda
Location

Culture and Arts Center station is a subway station in Yuelu District, Changsha, Hunan, China, operated by the Changsha subway operator Changsha Metro. It entered revenue service on December 28, 2015.

== History ==
The station opened on 28 December 2015.

== Layout ==
G		Exits
LG1	Concourse	Faregates, Station Agent
LG2	←	Line 2 towards West Meixi Lake (Luyun Road)
LG2	Island platform, doors open on the left
LG2		Line 2 towards Guangda (East Meixi Lake)	→

== Surrounding area ==
- Entrance No. 1 and No. 2: International Culture and Arts Center of Meixi Lake
- Entrance No. 4: Meilifang, Zhenyecheng
