= Jinxing Road station =

Metro station in Changsha, China

Coordinates: 28°12′44″N 112°56′07″E

Jinxing Road 金星路
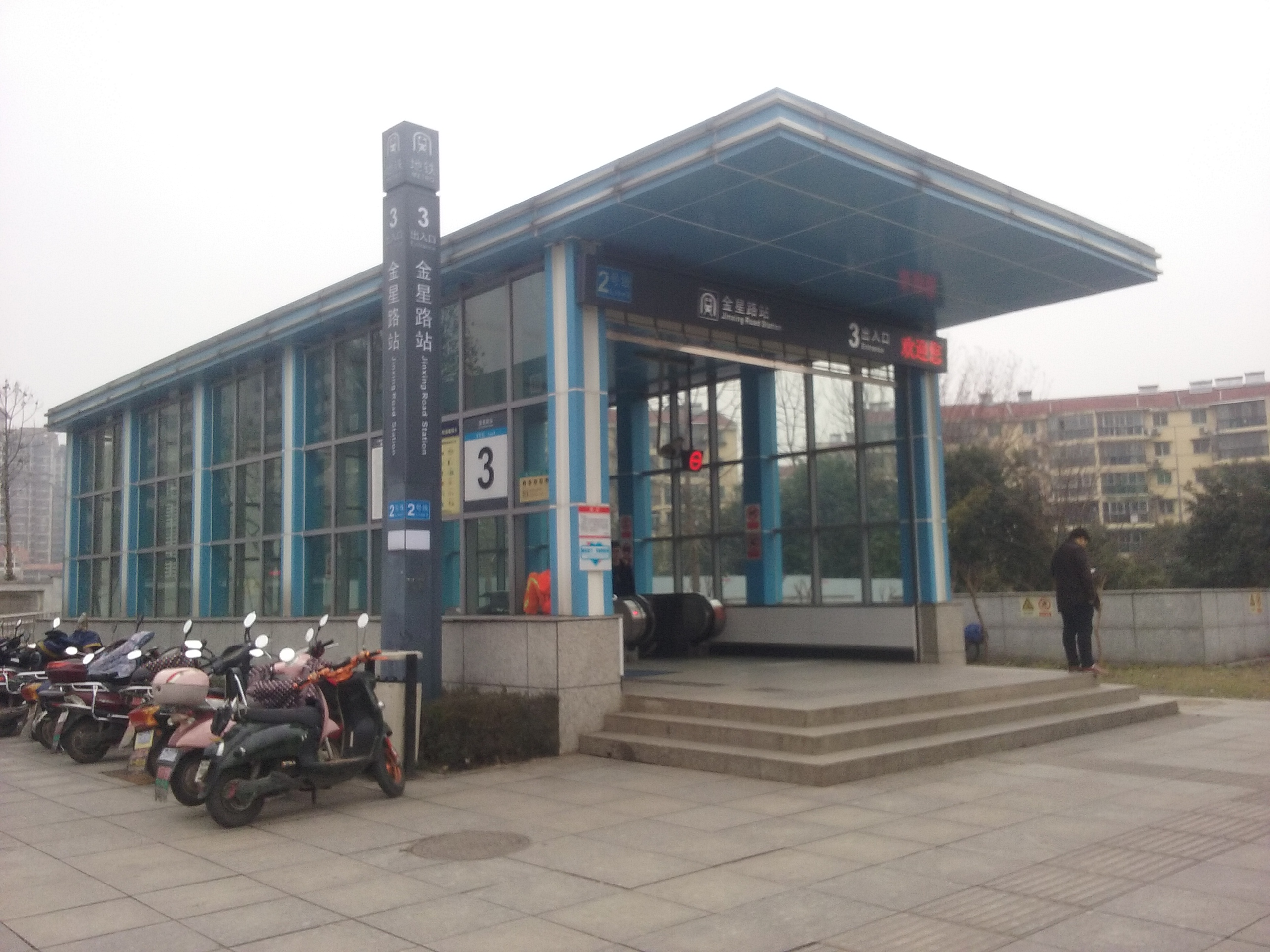

General information
- Location: Yuelu District, Changsha, Hunan; China
- Operated by: Changsha Metro
- Line(s): Line 2
- Platforms: 1 island platform

Other information
- Station code: 206

History
- Opened: 29 April 2014

Services
Preceding station	Changsha Metro	Following station
Wangchengpo towards West Meixi Lake	Line 2	Xihu Park towards Guangda

Jinxing Road station is a subway station in Changsha, Hunan, China, operated by the Changsha subway operator Changsha Metro.

== Station layout ==
The station has one island platform.

G		Exits
LG1	Concourse	Faregates, Station Agent
LG2	←	Line 2 towards West Meixi Lake (Wangchengpo)
LG2	Island platform, doors open on the left
LG2		Line 2 towards Guangda (Xihu Park)	→

== History ==
The station opened on 29 April 2014.

== Surrounding area ==
Huxiang Cancer Hospital of Traditional Chinese Medicine (Chinese:湖湘中医肿瘤医院)
