= Changsha IFS Tower =

Supertall skyscraper in Changsha, Hunan, China

Coordinates: 28°11′44″N 112°58′24″E

- 长沙国金中心
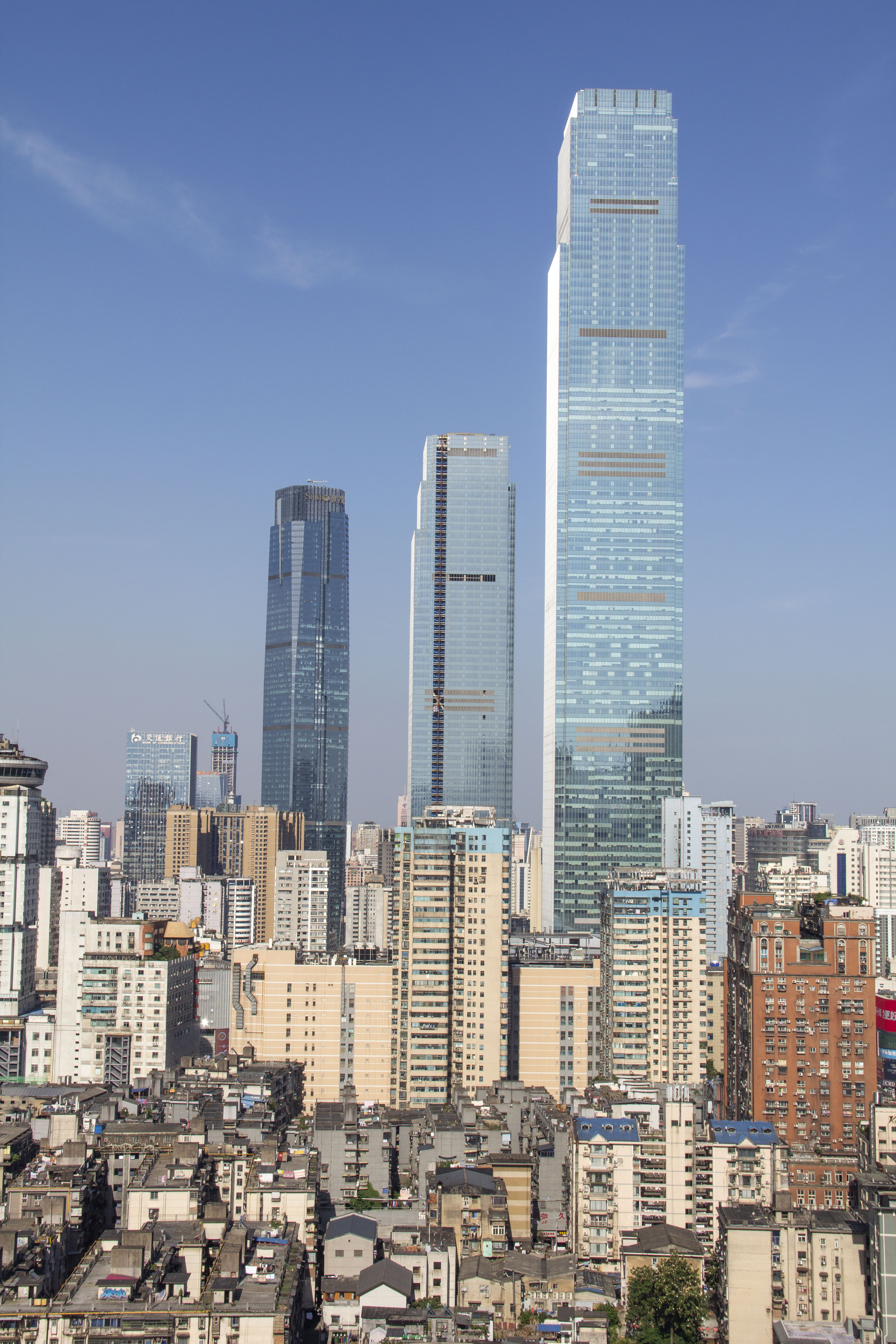
- Changsha IFS Tower in June 2021
- Interactive map of the Changsha IFS Tower area
- Former names: Hunan Province Twin Towers

General information
- Status: Completed
- Architectural style: Modern, contemporary
- Location: Furong District, Changsha, Hunan, China
- Groundbreaking: September 23, 2011
- Construction started: March 6, 2013
- Completed: April 8, 2018
- Opened: 2018
- Owner: The Wharf (Holdings)
- Landlord: The Wharf (Holdings)

Height
- Architectural: 452 metres (1,482.9 ft)
- Top floor: 431 metres (1,414.0 ft)

Technical details
- Floor count: 95
- Floor area: 300,000 m^{2} (3,200,000 ft^{2})

Design and construction
- Architecture firm: Wong Tung & Partners / Wong & Tung International Ltd
- Structural engineer: East China Architecture Design & Research Institute
- Main contractor: China Construction Second Engineering Bureau Ltd

Website
- www.csifs.cn

Changsha IFS Tower
- Simplified Chinese: 长沙国际金融中心
- Traditional Chinese: 長沙國際金融中心
Transcriptions
Standard Mandarin
- Hanyu Pinyin: Chángshā Guójì Jīnróng Zhōngxīn

Changsha IFS Tower is a pair of skyscrapers in Changsha, Hunan, China, with Tower 1 rising 452 metres and Tower 2 rising 315 metres. Construction started in 2013 and completed in 2017. It is the 20th tallest building in the world and the tallest in Hunan. IFS stands for "International Finance Square".

This twin-tower development is based on Harbour City, a hyper-connected retail development in Hong Kong. The Changsha complex sports an underground network of linkages to an interchange hub (Wuyi Square Station) for Changsha metro lines 1 and 2. The same underground passageway connects with one of the busiest pedestrian streets in China — Huangxing Road Pedestrian Shopping Street.

The rectangular form of the glass-clad towers is interrupted by a series of metal fins that add a hint of complexity to their appearance and reduce glare for the interior office spaces. Tower 1 features a crown that incrementally sets back by several metres at three points. Like many towers that break the 400-metre barrier, reduced floor plate sizes at the top are best suited for hotel uses—with guest willing to pay a premium for accommodations at such heights.

At the base, a block-sized podium contains a mega mall of 230,000 square metres. Changsha IFS Tower 1 also has 700 metres of retail street frontage, greater than that of its likeness, Harbour City. The retail mall, among the largest in Changsha and Central China, offers amenities spanning entertainment, lifestyle, culture, and dining.

== See also ==
- List of tallest buildings in China
