= Xiangjiang New Area =

Area of Changsha, China

The Xiangjiang New Area (Chinese: 湘江新区; pinyin: Xiāngjiāng xīnqū) is a new area at state level in Changsha City, Hunan Province, China. Created on 8 April 2015, it is the 12th state-level new area approved to establish by the State Council. Xiangjiang New Area is located in the west of the Xiang River and covers parts of Yuelu, Wangcheng and Ningxiang. According to the official reply of the State Council, the new area has an area of 490 km^{2} (190 sq mi). The Hunan CPC Party Secretary Xu Shousheng and Hunan Governor Du Jiahao attended the opening ceremony of the new area held in Changsha, 24 May 2015.

In 2015, Xiangjiang New Area covers a built-up area of 126 square kilometres (49 sq mi), it has a population of roughly 1,340,000, its GDP reaches CNY 160.25 billion (US$25.73 billion), and its GDP per capita is CNY 119,500 (US$19,186).

== Geography ==
According to the Development Planning of Xiangjiang New Area approved by the Government of Hunan Province on May 22, 2016, it has a planned area of about 1,200 square kilometres (460 sq mi) with a core zone of 490 square kilometres (190 sq mi), the planned area covers the whole Yuelu District, the total area on the south of the Wei River and the west of the Xiang River of Wangcheng District, parts of Ningxiang County.

=== Core zone ===
The core zone of Xiangjiang New Area consists of most of Yuelu District, the total area on the south of the Wei River and the west of the Xiang River of Wangcheng District, Jinzhou Town of Ningxiang County.

- 17 subdistricts of Yuelu Districts: Dongfanghong, Guanshaling, Hanpu, Juzizhou, Lugu, Meixihu, Pingtang, Tianding, Wangchengpo, Wangyuehu, Wangyue, Xihu, Xianjiahu, Xueshi, Yanghu, Yinpenling and Yuelu subdistricts. of which Lugu Subdistrict is entrusted to manage by Changsha High-Tech Industrial Development Zone (CSHTZ).
- 9 subdistricts and towns of Wangcheng District: Bairuopu, Baishazhou, Dazehu, Gaotangling, Huangjinyuan, Jinshanqiao, Leifeng, Wushan and Yueliangdao 9 subdistricts and towns. of which Leifeng Subdistrict is entrusted to manage by CSHTZ.
- Jinzhou Town of Ningxiang County. Jinzhou is home of Ningxiang High-tech Industrial Park.
