= Wangyuehu =

Wangyuehu 望月湖街道
- subdistrict
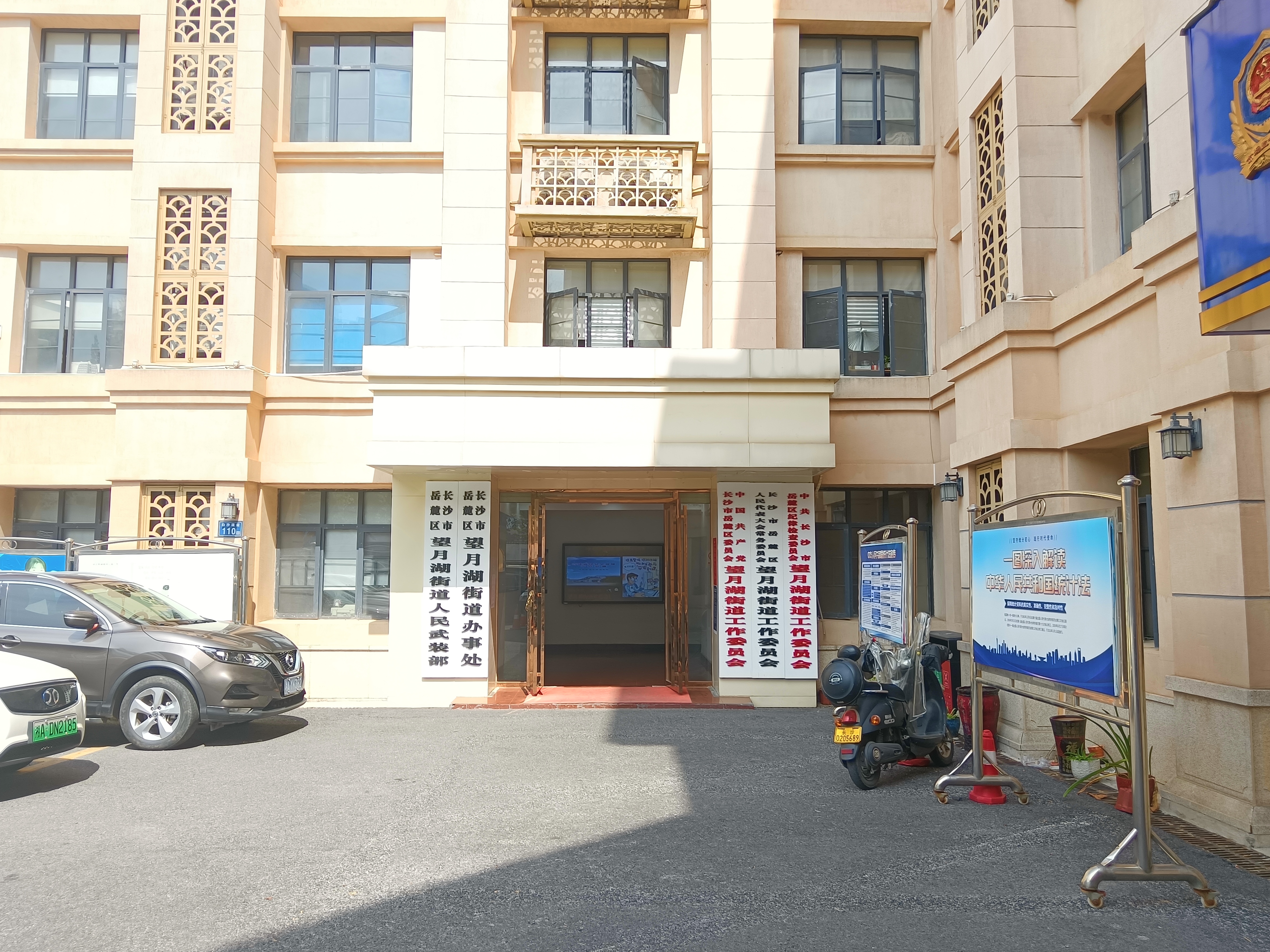
- Government Building of Wangyuehu Subdistrict

- Location within Hunan
- Coordinates: 28°12′05″N 112°57′09″E
- Country: People's Republic of China
- Province: Hunan
- Prefecture-level city: Changsha
- District: Yuelu District

Area
  - Total: 1.57 km^{2} (0.61 sq mi)

Population (2015)
  - Total: 52,000
  - Density: 33,000/km^{2} (86,000/sq mi)
- Time zone: UTC+8 (China Standard)
- Area code: 0731
- Languages: Standard Chinese and Changsha dialect
- Website: http://www.yuelu.gov.cn/wyhjd/index.html

Wangyuehu Subdistrict (Chinese: 望月湖街道; pinyin: Wàngyuèhú Jiēdào) is a subdistrict of Yuelu District in Changsha, Hunan, China. The subdistrict has an area of 1.57 square kilometres (0.61 sq mi) with a permanent population of about 52,000 (as of 2015). The subdistrict has six communities under its jurisdiction.

== History ==
The subdistrict was part of Yuewen Township (Chinese: 岳文乡) in 1949. The subdistrict of Yingwanlu (Chinese: 溁湾路街道) was established in 1956 and it was renamed to the present name in 1988.

The two communities of Zhongnan (Chinese: 中南社区) and Xingling (Chinese: 湘陵社区) were enclaves of Yuelu District located in Gaotangling of Wangcheng District, which were under jurisdiction of Wangyuehu Subdistrict. On December 6, 2017, the two communities were transferred to Gaotangling Subdistrict of Wangcheng District from Yuelu District.

== Geography ==
The subdistrict of Wangyuehu is located to the south of the Longwanggang River, east of Wanqiao Road (Chinese: 湾桥路), north of Juzizhou Bridge (Chinese: 橘子洲大桥) and Fenglin Road (Chinese: 枫林路), adjacent to the Xiang River. It is bordered by Yinpenling to the north, Xihu to the west and Juzizhou to the south.

== Subdivisions ==
6 communities

- Hudong Community (Chinese: 湖东社区)
- Huzhong Community (Chinese: 湖中社区)
- Ronghua Community (Chinese: 荣华社区)
- Ronglong Community (Chinese: 荣龙社区)
- Yingwanzhen Community (Chinese: 溁湾镇社区)
- Yuelong Community (Chinese: 岳龙社区)
