= Bafang Community =

Community in Changsha, Hunan, China

Bafang 八方小区
- Community
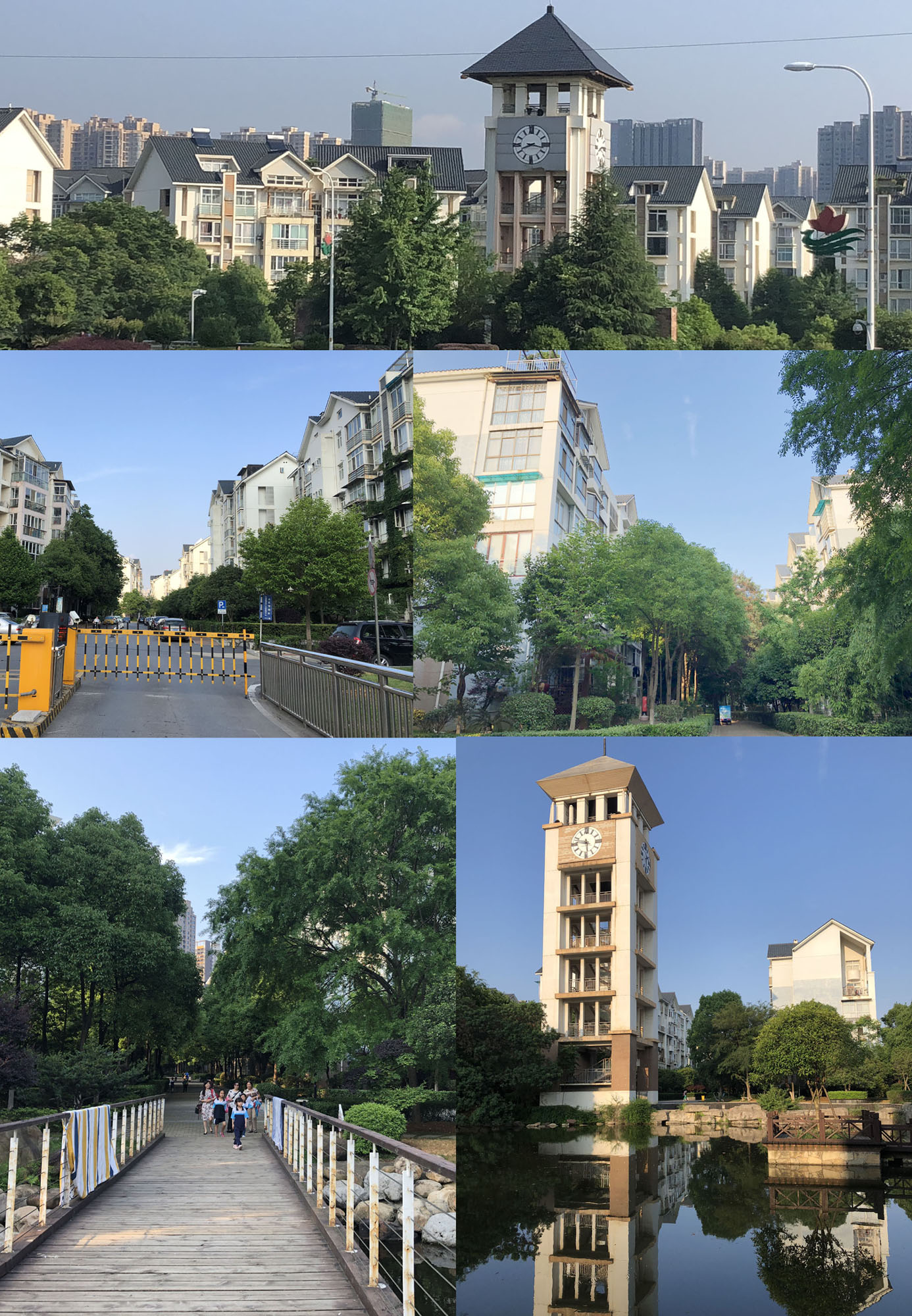
- The exterior of Bafang Community in Changsha

- Location within Hunan
- Coordinates: 28°14′18″N 112°56′30″E
- Country: People's Republic of China
- Province: Hunan
- City: Changsha
- District: Yuelu District
- Subdistrict: Wangyue

Area
  - Total: 0.8 km^{2} (0.31 sq mi)
- Time zone: UTC+8 (China Standard)
- Area code: 0731
- Languages: Standard Chinese and Changsha dialect

Bafang Community (Chinese: 八方社区; pinyin: Bāfāng Shèqū) is a community of Wangyue Subdistrict in Yuelu District, Changsha, China.

The community is located in the northeast of Wangyue Subdistrict and the east of Yuelu District, it is a pure residence with 4 blocks of residential area named Bafang Residential Area (Chinese: 八方小区) surrounded by four roads. The residential area of Bafang was named after Bafang Mountain (Chinese: 八方山), it was invested and developed by Changsha Jingfa Real Estate (Chinese: 长沙经发房地产) under Chanfine Group (Chinese: 长房集团). The community is bounded by Jinxing Road to the west, Chazishan Road to the north, Yuehua Road to the east and Dujuan Road to the south, it covers an area of about 0.8 square kilometers with households of 11,017.

== History ==
In 2001, the Government Buildings of Changsha was transferred to Yuelu Anvenue in Yuelu District from Panzheng Street in Furong District, the core area in the east of Xiang River. In order to promote the development in the west of Xiang, ease the traffic pressure in the city proper and facilitate work and life of civil servants, after researching and reporting to Hunan Province Commission for Discipline Inspection, a decision was made to support the construction of commercial housing residence for civil servants.

The residential site is located at the junction of Wangyue and Guanshaling subdistricts in Yuelu District. The total land area is 97.73 hectares (1,466 mu). The project is implemented in two phases. The first phase includes 2 blocks of A and D. The project started in 2002 and the main building was completed in 2005. its main facilities include a kindergarten, a primary school and a middle school. The second phase of the project are 2 blocks of B and C. The project started in 2015 and the building was completed in 2017.

== First phase of project ==
The project of first phase includes Block A and D of Bafang Residential Area, which are characterised by low-rise five - storey buildings. Including Heyuan Park located in the southeast of Block D, there are 2,543 households in Bafang Residential Block A and D.

When the project was completed in 2005, there were hardly any roads, public transportation and commercial facilities around. Plus, the price of the first-period house was much higher than the price of the surrounding real estate. For example, the Residential Area of Xianjia Xincun (Chinese: 咸嘉新村小区) is less than one kilometer away from the south of Bafang, its location is closer to the central urban area, and the supporting infrastructure around the community was very complete at that time. The opening price of its real estate is only 900-1,000 yuan (109-121 US dollars) per square meter in 2002. In the same period, the real estate of Bafang opened at 1,380 yuan (167 US dollars) per square meter. At the time of delivery, the developer violated the contract by raising the price by 180 yuan (22 US dollars) per square meter. At last, the number of civil servants actually purchasing the house was lower than expected.

In the first five years, the occupancy rate after purchase had been very low. Around 2006, the surrounding roads, public transportation, kindergarten and other supporting facilities were gradually normalized. Especially after the opening of primary school in 2006, the occupancy rate of homes had gradually increased, but at most less than one-third. In general, the occupancy rate did not become normal and exceeded 70% until the start of the second phase of construction in 2014.

=== Heyuan Park ===
The Heyuan Park (Chinese: 八方和园) is a non-civil servants residential area, it is a part of Block D. The property was invested and developed by the same developer, Changsha Jingfa Real Estate under Chanfine Group, it is called as Changfang Heyuan (Chinese: 长房和园). The real estate is located in the southeast of Block D, it covers an area of 27,547 square meters (41.3 mu) with a total construction area of about 80,000 square meters. there are 6 buildings of 13-17 story pure plate-type high-rise with a total of 483 households and a large area of 130-260 square meters per household. The exterior of its building is dark brown and the landscape is mainly based on educational themes.

== Second phase of project ==
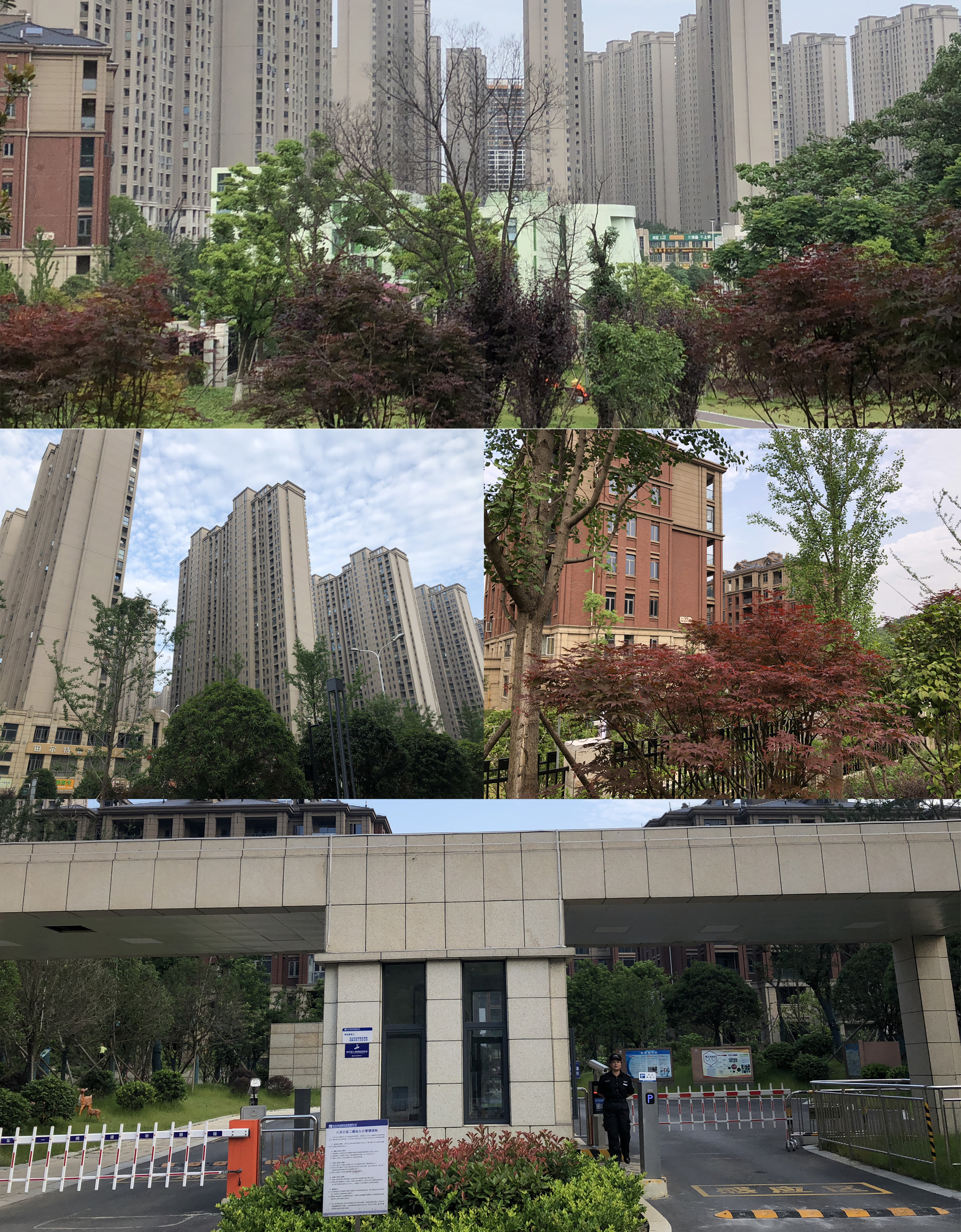
Bafang Residential Area Second phase of project

The second-phase project covers an area of 430,000 square meters and the total building area is 1.83 million square meters. The project includes Block B and C, which are mainly characterised by high-rise 31 to 33 - storey buildings. Including the Residential Area of Senior Officials or Mayor Building (Chinese: 市长楼) located in the northwest of Block B and to the northeast side of Bafang Park (Chinese: 八方公园), there are 8,742 households in Block B and C.

Block B has a total of 18 high-rise (32-33 floors) and 15 multi-storey (3-7 floors) buildings, its gross area is 703,550 square meters. There are a total of 29 high-rise (31-33 floors) and 9 multi-storey (2-4 floors) buildings in Block C, the gross area is 951,732 square meters (excluding the large supermarket).

== Supporting facilities ==
=== Senior Citizens Activity Center ===
Changsha Senior Citizens Activity Center (Chinese: 长沙市老干部活动中心) is located at the central part of Bafang Community and at the southeastern corner of Bangfang Park. The activity center is surrounded by the Bangfang Park and Guansha Road from west to east, the second kindergarten and Hanguang Road from north to south. It covers an area of 23,970 square metres (258,000 sq ft) with a gross area of about 20,000 square metres (220,000 sq ft). The center was officially opened in 2012. Its facilities in Bafang Community include an outdoor basketball court, an indoor badminton court, a table tennis room, a fitness center, and chess and card activity rooms.

=== Bangfang Park ===
Bangfang Park runs from Jinxing Road in the west to the Residential Area of Senior Officials and the Senior Citizens Activity Center in the east, to Chazishan Road in the north, and to Hanguang Road in the south. It covers an area of about 22 hectares, it was completed and opened on April 27, 2017. The park is a comprehensive mountainous park integrating tourism, leisure, fitness and entertainment. The park is not very large with the most complete functions. It is introduced a large lawn dedicated to kites for children and middle-aged people. Recreational and fitness venues, as well as direct drinking water that can be tapped to open the door, are specially designed for young adults to climb the mountain.
