= Ganzi Village =

Ganzi Village 鑒子村
- village
- Location within Hunan
- Coordinates: 28°02′09″N 112°47′52″E
- Country: China
- Province: Hunan
- City: Changsha
- District: Yuelu District
- Subdistrict: Hanpu

Area
  - Total: 8.2 km^{2} (3.2 sq mi)

Population (2017)
  - Total: 2,590
- Time zone: UTC+8 (China Standard)
- Area code: 0731
- Languages: Standard Chinese and Changsha dialect

Ganzi Village (Chinese: 干子村; pinyin: Gànzǐ Cūn or Jianzi Village (Chinese: 鉴子村; pinyin: Jiànzǐ Cūn) is a village of Hanpu Subdistrict in Yuelu District, Changsha, China. The village is an enclave of Yuelu District located between Yuhu District of Xiangtan and Ningxiang. It covers an area of 8.2 km^{2} (3.2 sq mi) with about 730 households and a population of 2,590 (as of 2017). The village has 25 groups, its villagers' committee is at Yangliutang (Chinese: 杨柳塘).

== History ==
The village was originally named "Jianzi Village" (simplified Chinese: 鉴字村; traditional Chinese: 鑒字村; pinyin: Jiànzì Cūn or simplified Chinese: 鉴子村; traditional Chinese: 鑒子村; pinyin: Jiànzi Cūn). The local Changsha dialects for Chinese characters "鉴字", "鉴子" and "干子" are homophones and are pronounced as "Ganzi". Although their different Chinese character writings, the local dialect pronunciation is the same, but it is quite different in standard Chinese pronunciation. Mainly because of the Chinese character "干子" easier to write, the name of the village gradually evolved from "Jianzi" to "ganzi" in standard Chinese pronunciation with differences in writing Chinese characters.

== Geography ==
Ganzi Village is located in the west of Jin River between Heling Town (Chinese: 鹤岭镇) of Yuhu District and Daolin Town of Ningxiang. It is bordered with Jingxin Village (Chinese: 晶鑫村) of Heling Town to the north, Xiaojing Village (Chinese: 小荆村) of Heling Town across the Jin River to the east, Jinqiao Village (Chinese: 金侨村) of Heling Town to the south, Longquanhu Village (Chinese: 龙泉湖村) of Daolin Township to the west. Ganzi Village is high in the west and low in the east with a long strip of its land. It is 5 kilometers long from east to west, 2 kilometers long from north to south, it has an area of 8.2 square kilometers and 150.495 hectares (2256.3 mu) of arable land.

== Infrastructure ==
Ganzi Village is located in the center of the Changsha-Zhuzhou-Xiangtan City Cluster, but it is an enclave of Yuelu District. It is surrounded by Xiangtan on three sides of the north, south and east. The whole village is powered by Xiangtan, it has been poor infrastructure. In 2013, Local authorities of Changsha and Xiangtan invested 8 million yuan (about 129 million US dollars) to transform the power supply in the village. The transformer was upgraded from the previous 220 kilowatts to 1,520 kilowatts. In 2014, Ganzi Primary School and public kindergarten were incorporated into the educational facilities of Yuelu District and they were formally enrolled in the autumn of 2015.

== Primary school and kindergarten ==
The Ganzi Primary School (Chinese: 干字小学) and its sub-kindergarten project is invested by the government of Yuelu District. It is built in 6 classes of primary school and 3 classes of kindergartens. The construction area is approximately 500 square meters, including the primary school teaching building, kindergarten, canteen and teacher turnover room. Sports field and so on. Its construction began on 4 December 2014 and students officially met in September 2015. In 2016, there were 119 students and 9 faculty members.

The school and its ancillary facilities are planned to cover a total area of 31 mu (20,677 square meters), and the construction area of school buildings and teacher turnover houses is approximately 5,000 square meters. After the completion of the school, the primary school will have 6 classes and 3 classes of kindergartens, which can accommodate 400 students to study at the same time, fully satisfying the needs of the village and surrounding education.

== 2014 Changsha School Bus Accident ==
The 2014 Changsha School Bus Traffic Accident (Chinese: 长沙市岳麓区7·10重大交通(校车)事故) occurred at 16:35 on 10 July 2014. Zheng Youhua (Chinese: 郑友华), a driver of Lelewang Kindergarten (Chinese: 乐乐旺幼儿园) located in Jinqiao Village of Xiangtang Township (Chinese: 响塘乡; modern Heling Town) drove a school bus to the children's home in Changsha, the vehicle crashed into a pond in Shitang'ao (Chinese: 石塘坳) of Ganzi Village. The incident caused the death of all 11 people in the vehicle, including the driver, and direct economic losses of 6.57 million yuan (about 1.07 million US dollars).

The accident resulted in four persons being held criminally liable and 21 people under administrative scrutiny. The incident directly led to a national school bus safety hazard investigation and treatment, it accelerated the standardized management of school buses. The implementation of the school bus safety management responsibility has formed the main focus of the government, and a model for joint management of schools, families and society.
