= Changsha Experimental Primary School =

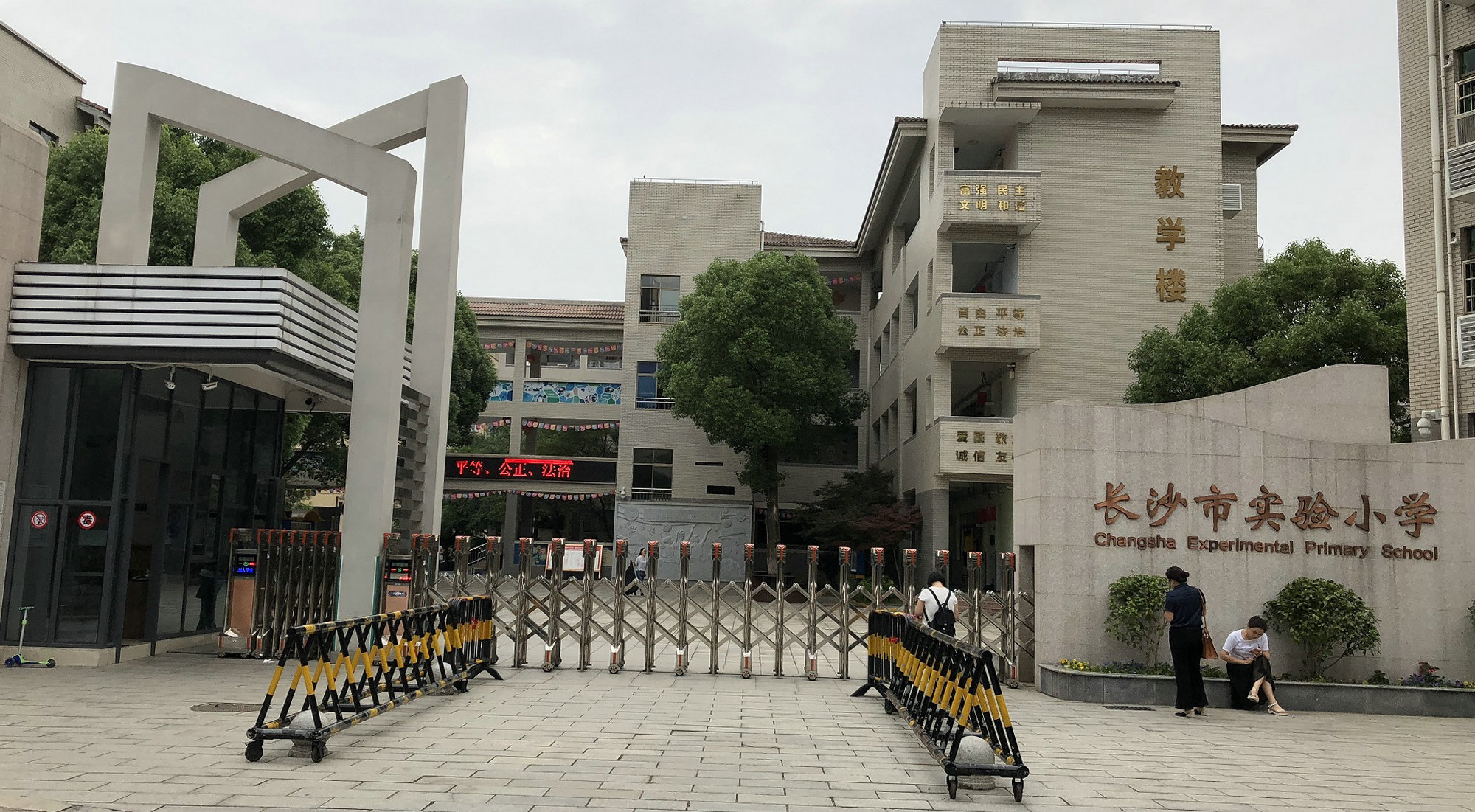

Location
- Bafang Community, Yuelu District, Changsha, Hunan; China
- Coordinates: 28°14′07″N 112°56′39″E

Information
- Former name: First Elementary School of Hunan
- Type: public primary school
- Established: 1905
- Website: http://www.csssyxx.com

Changsha Experimental Primary School (Chinese: 长沙市实验小学; pinyin: Chǎngshāshì Shíyàn Xiǎoxué) is a six - year public primary school located in Wangyue Subdistrict, Changsha, Hunan. It was formerly known as the First Elementary School of Hunan Province (湖南官立初等第一小学堂) founded in 1905 (31st year of Qing dynasty Guangxu). In December 1983, it was approved to change to the present name by the Changsha Municipal Government. It is an experimental, scientific and exemplary window school, the school is located at Block D of Bafang Residential Area, it is directly managed by the Changsha Municipal Bureau of Education.

== History ==
The Changsha Experimental Primary School was founded in 1905 and it began as the First Elementary School of Hunan Province. The school has more than 100 years of history and has changed the school names for nine times. On December 27, 1983, the Changsha Municipal Government decided to take back the Shunxingqiao Primary School (顺星桥小学) of the former East District as an experimental school directly administered by the Changsha Municipal Bureau of Education. On June 23, 1984, the Changsha Municipal Bureau of Education formally decided to take Shunxingqiao Primary School back under its direct administration. On July 1, 1984, the school was officially renamed Changsha Experimental Primary School, the present name. In August 2006, under the unified deployment of the Changsha Municipal Bureau of Education, the school relocated from No. 38, Shunxingqiao (or Shunxing Bridge), Cai'e Road, Furong District, to Block D of Bafang Community, Yuelu District. The school is one of group members of the China Education Association, an experimental base of modern elementary mathematics and a model school of the Chinese Academy of Sciences, an experimental school of the Hunan Normal University Research Center for the Basic Education Curriculum Reform of the Ministry of Education, a demonstration school in Changsha, and Changsha Modern Education Technology Experimental School and Chairman Unit of Changsha Mathematical Teaching Professional Committee.

== Campus ==
The school's first-phase project is located in the northwestern corner of Block D of Bafang Community, north of Hanguang Road and west of Guansha Road. It covers an area of 21,200 square meters and a building area of 16,953.58 square meters. The school site is fully functional with seven buildings including a teaching building, a science and technology building, an office building, and a living building. The campus has 200 meters of circular track, more than 3,500 square meters of plastic playground, basketball court and sports equipment area and other places suitable for primary school students to carry out sports activities. The school is equipped with a campus network, closed-circuit television system and security monitoring system, classrooms and function rooms are equipped with advanced multimedia teaching platform. As of 2015, the school has 36 teaching classes, 2,231 students and a total of 108 school employees.

=== Expansion project ===
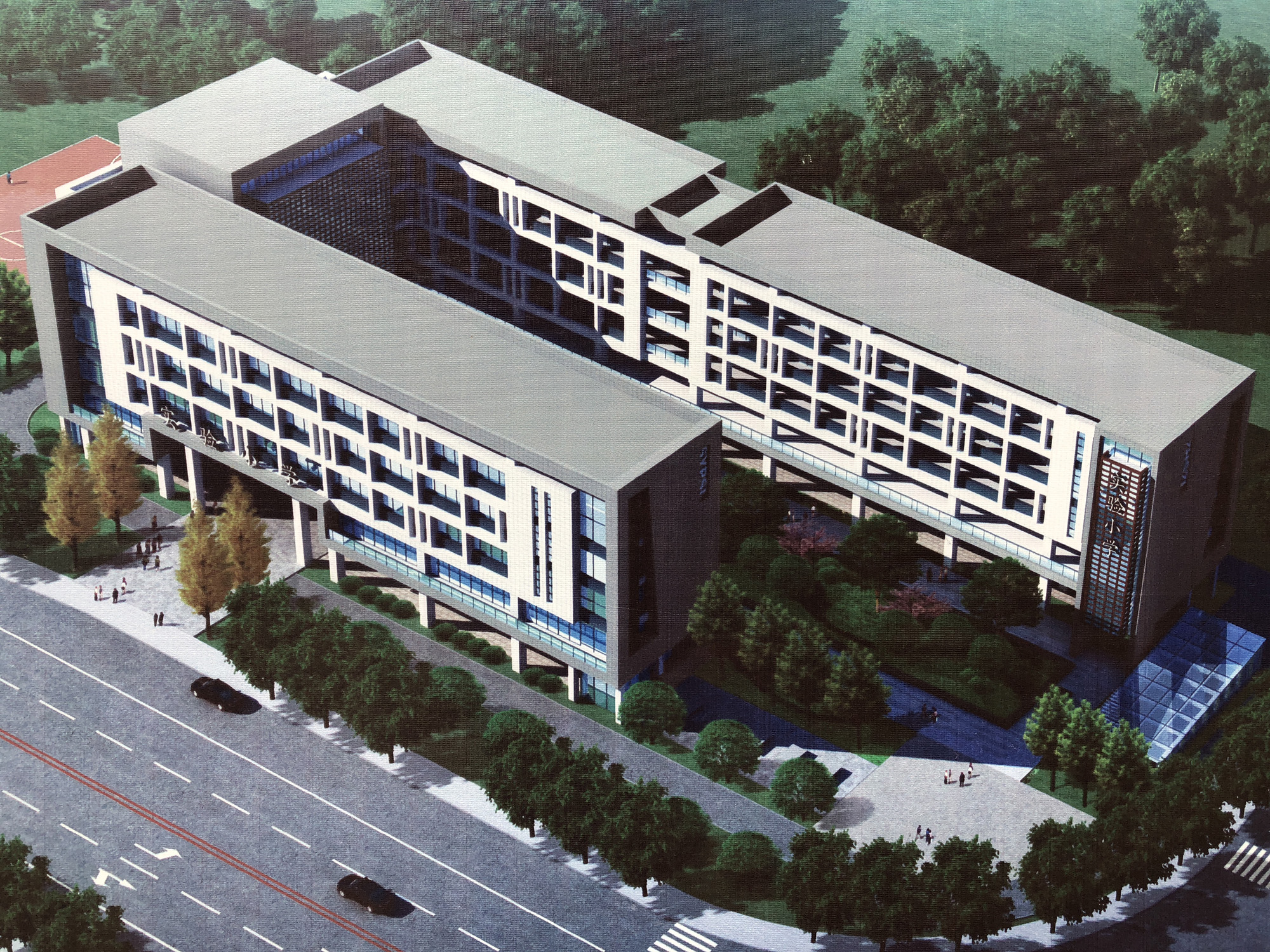
The school of front entrance, facing Hanguang Road, Rendering of its expansion project in 2018

The expansion project is located in the southeastern corner of Block B in Bafang Community, north of Hanguang Road, west of Guansha Road, the project officially launched on March 16, 2018. It covers a total land area of 17,392 square meters, a net land area of 7,529 square meters and a total construction area of 14,806 square meters. The construction content includes a teaching building, a comprehensive building, a report Hall, corridors, an underground garage and so on. The floor area of which about 10,807 square meters, basement construction area of about 3,999 square meters. Its total project Investment estimated 110.01 million yuan (about 17.46 million US dollars), of which the project cost of 61.44 million yuan (about 9.75 million US dollars), the construction of other costs 11.33 million yuan (about 1.80 million US dollars).
