= Waterways of Tongxi Creek =

Watercourses in Hunan, China

Coordinates: 28°03′16″N 112°55′26″E

The Waterways of Tongxi Creek (Chinese: 桐溪港水系) are a group of small lakes and streams located in the left (western) bank of Xiang River, Yuelu District, Changsha, Hunan, China. The Tongxi Creek is the main stream and it is a seasonal river, its headwaters rise in the Shifeng Mountain (Chinese: 狮峰山) of Pingtang Subdistrict. The creek flows about 3 kilometres (1.9 mi) east and merges into Xiang River at Dongxigang (Chinese: 桐溪港).
