= Longwanggang River =

River in Hunan, China

Coordinates: 28°12′30″N 112°57′31″E

Longwanggang River (Chinese: 龙王港) is a left-bank tributary of the Changsha section of Xiang River in Hunan Province, China. The river has two source streams, the north and south sources. Leifeng River is the north source stream, which rises in Liaojiaping. The south source is regarded as the main stream, it originates from Nanjiaoling (Chinese: 南角岭), which is located in the eastern side of Wufeng Mountain (Chinese: 五丰山) of Lianhua, Yuelu District.

Longwanggang River has a length of 31 kilometres (19 mi), its drainage basin covers 173 square kilometres (67 sq mi). It runs generally west to east through Lianhua, Leifeng, Tianding, Meixihu, Wangchengpo and Xihu, joins Xiang River at Yingyinqiao Briage (Chinese: 溁银桥) between Yinpenling and Wangyuehu subdistricts.
