= Wangchengpo =

Wangchengpo 望城坡街道
- subdistrict
- Location within Hunan
- Coordinates: 28°12′17″N 112°55′01″E
- Country: People's Republic of China
- Province: Hunan
- City: Changsha
- District: Yuelu District

Area
  - Total: 4.96 km^{2} (1.92 sq mi)

Population (2015)
  - Total: 80,000
  - Density: 16,000/km^{2} (42,000/sq mi)
- Time zone: UTC+8 (China Standard)
- Area code: 0731
- Languages: Standard Chinese and Changsha dialect
- Website: http://www.yuelu.gov.cn/wcpjd/index.html

Wangchengpo Subdistrict (Chinese: 望城坡街道; pinyin: Wàngchéngpō Jiēdào) is a subdistrict of Yuelu District in Changsha, the capital of Hunan, China. It was formed in 1998. The subdistrict has an area of 4.96 square kilometres (1.92 sq mi) with a permanent population of about 80,000 (as of 2015). The subdistrict has 10 communities under its jurisdiction.

== Etymology ==
Wangcheng (Chinese: 望城) means to be able to see the city in Chinese, overlooking the city. Po (Chinese: 坡) means hill, hillside. Here, the meaning of Wangchengpo refers to the hill that can look at Changsha City. Wangchengpo was historically a hill, and it was named because people could see Changsha City there. In ancient times, it used to be the starting point in Changsha for the ancient courier routes connecting Guizhou and Sichuan, and it had been gathering for thousands of years.

It is worth mentioning that the real Wangchengpo Old Street (Chinese: 望城坡老街) is in Xidamen Community (Chinese: 西大门社区) of Xianjiahu Subdistrict. When Wangcheng County (Chinese: 望城县) was built in 1951, here was the seat of Wangcheng County, and the county was named after its seat. The seat's location of Wangchengpo Subdistrict is called Kafangling (Chinese: 卡防岭) in the past. Also, the location of the current Changsha West Bus Station (Chinese: 长沙汽车西站) is called Sanlilong (Chinese: 三里垅).

== History ==
The subdistrict of Wangchengpo was established in 1998. It was amalgamated by the former two villages of Jiantang (Chinese: 涧塘村) and Wangxin (Chinese: 望新村) from Tianding Township (Chinese: 天顶乡). In April 1999, it was also included in the Hejiawan Villager Group (Chinese: 何家湾组) of Yanshan Village (Chinese: 燕山村) in Tianding Township.

== Geography ==
Wangchengpo Subdistrict is located in the middle of Yuelu District, 1.5 kilometers away from Changsha Municipal Government. There are more than 70 provincial and municipal units in its territory including Hunan University of Technology and Commerce, Changsha Meteorological Bureau, Changsha West Bus Station, more than 110 small enterprises and more than 3,000 individual industrial and commercial households. The subdistrict is situated in the core area of Xiangjiang New Area, adjacent to Meixihu International Functional Service Area and Changsha High-Tech Industrial Development Zone.

The transportation in the area is convenient. Changsha West Bus Station (Chinese: 长沙汽车西站) is located in it. Changsha Comprehensive Transportation Hub (Chinese: 长沙综合交通枢纽) and Wangchengpo Metro Transfer Station are in the center, The main trunk lines of Second Ring Road (Chinese: 二环线), Leifeng Avenue (Chinese: 雷锋大道), Yuelu Avenue (Chinese: 岳麓大道), Jinxing Avenue (Chinese: 金星大道), Xianjiahu West Road (Chinese: 咸嘉湖西路), Fenglin Road (Chinese: 枫林路) and Tongzipo Road (Chinese: 桐梓坡路) constitute the “three vertical and three horizontal” of its traffic lines.

== Subdivisions ==
10 communities

- Changhua Community (Chinese: 长华社区)
- Jiangongshan Community (Chinese: 箭弓山社区)
- Jiantang Community (Chinese: 涧塘社区)
- Laohuling Community (Chinese: 老虎岭社区)
- Nanjiatang Community (Chinese: 南家塘社区)
- Shangmaocheng Community (Chinese: 商贸城社区)
- Wanglu Community (Chinese: 望麓社区)
- Wangxin Community (Chinese: 望新社区)
- Xiangyi Community (Chinese: 湘仪社区)
- Zhumatang Community (Chinese: 竹马塘社区)

== Transport ==
- Wangchengpo station
