= Tongxi Temple =

Buddhist temple in China

- 桐溪寺
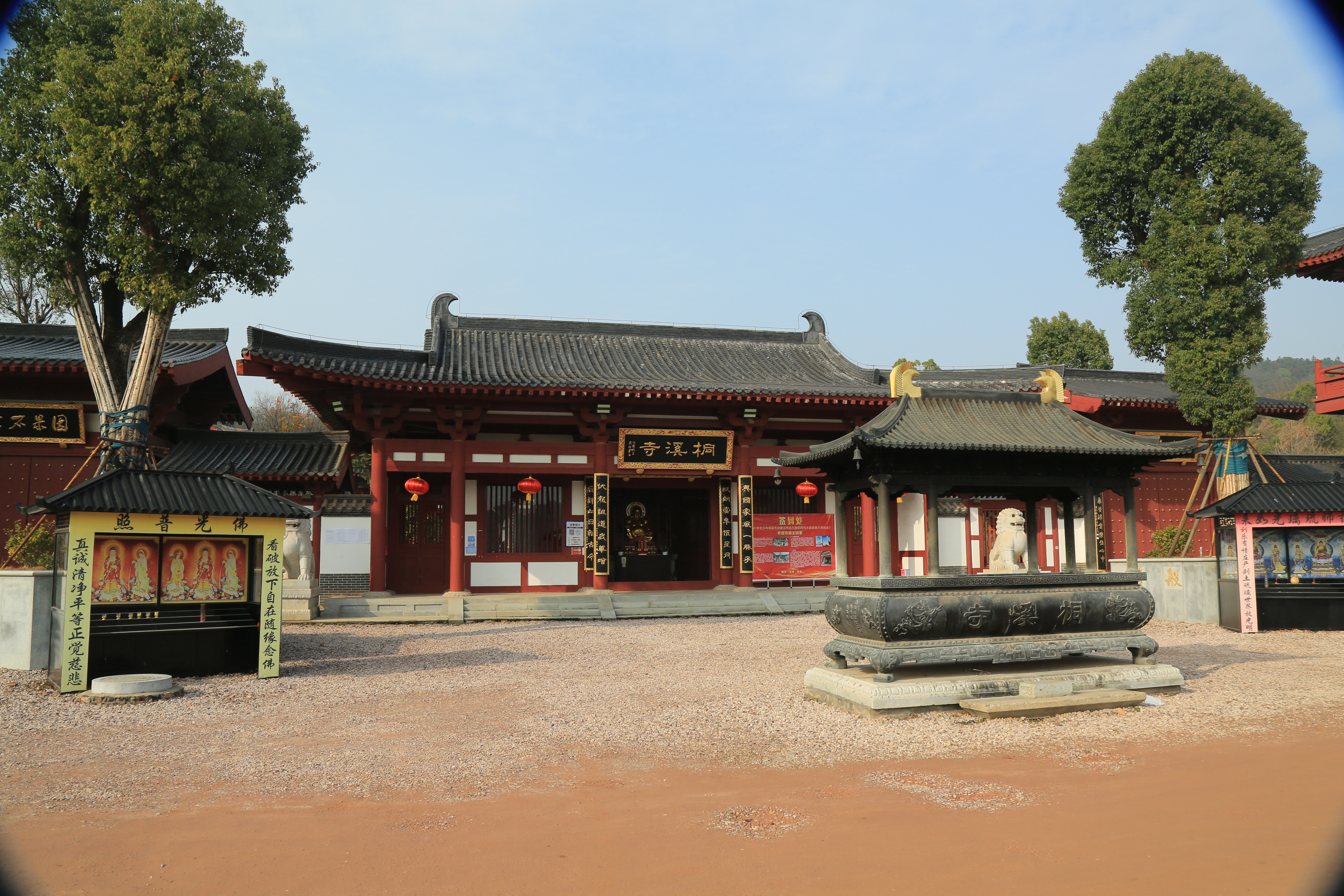
- Four Heavenly Kings Hall, Tongxi Temple

- Location within Hunan

Religion
- Affiliation: Buddhism
- Sect: Chan Buddhism
- Leadership: Shi Rongchan

Location
- Location: Pingtang Subdistrict of Yuelu District, Changsha, Hunan, China
- Interactive map of Tongxi Temple
- Coordinates: 28°05′01″N 112°54′31″E

Architecture
- Style: Chinese architecture
- Established: 791
- Completed: 2005 (reconstruction)

Tongxi Temple (Chinese: 桐溪寺; pinyin: Tóngxī Sì) is a Buddhist temple located in Pingtang Subdistrict of Yuelu District, Changsha, Hunan, China.

== History ==
The temple was built in 791 by Chan master Zhenlang (振郎禅师), a disciple of Qingyuan Xingsi, under the Tang dynasty (618–907). At that time it bore the name "Xingguo Temple" (兴国寺). Since Emperor Wuzong (814-846) believed in Taoism, he ordered to demolish Buddhist temples, confiscate temple lands and force monks to return to secular life. The temple was completely destroyed during the Great Anti-Buddhist Persecution.

The temple was built in the Song dynasty (960–1279) and renamed "Fulong Temple" (伏龙庵; 'Taming Dragon Temple'), and was smashed during wars in the late Ming dynasty (1368–1644).

In the Qing dynasty (1644–1911), Chan master Tianyan Yingshi (天岩应适) led his disciples to rebuild the temple and changed its name to "Tongxi Temple". In 1874, Zeng Guofan was buried at Fulong Mountain (伏龙山; 'Taming Dragon Mountain') behind the temple.

During the Republic of China, Tongxi Temple, Lushan Temple, Kaifu Temple, Gaoshan Temple (杲山寺), Shanglin Temple (上林寺), Baoning Temple, Hualin Temple (华林寺), and Lingyun Temple (灵云寺) were collectively known as the "Eight Temples of Changsha" (长沙八大丛林). In 1944, the well-known poet-monk Wan Xiu (万休) died at Tongxi Temple.

During the ten-year Cultural Revolution the Red Guards had attacked the temple in 1966. Volumes of scriptures, historical documents, and other works of art were either removed, damaged or destroyed in the massive socialist movement. In 2005, when reading the Buddhist Annals of Changsha (长沙市佛教志), Shi Rongchan (释容禅) saw the records of Tongxi Temple and wanted to visit the temple, but found that only two old Podocarpus macrophyllus and a Ginkgo biloba were left in front of the temple gate. He vowed to rebuild the temple under the Podocarpus macrophyllus. In 2005, with the support of Buddhist believers, Tongxi Temple was rebuilt and was officially opened to the public.

== Architecture ==
In the 1960s, Tongxi Temple still had 108 rooms and houses, from the mountainside to the foot of Fulong Mountain, but during the Cultural Revolution, the Red Guards razed it to the ground.

After the reconstruction, now the extant buildings include the Free Life Pond, Four Heavenly Kings Hall, Mahavira Hall, Guanyin Hall, Buddhist texts library, Bell tower, Drum tower and other ring-rooms.

== Gallery ==
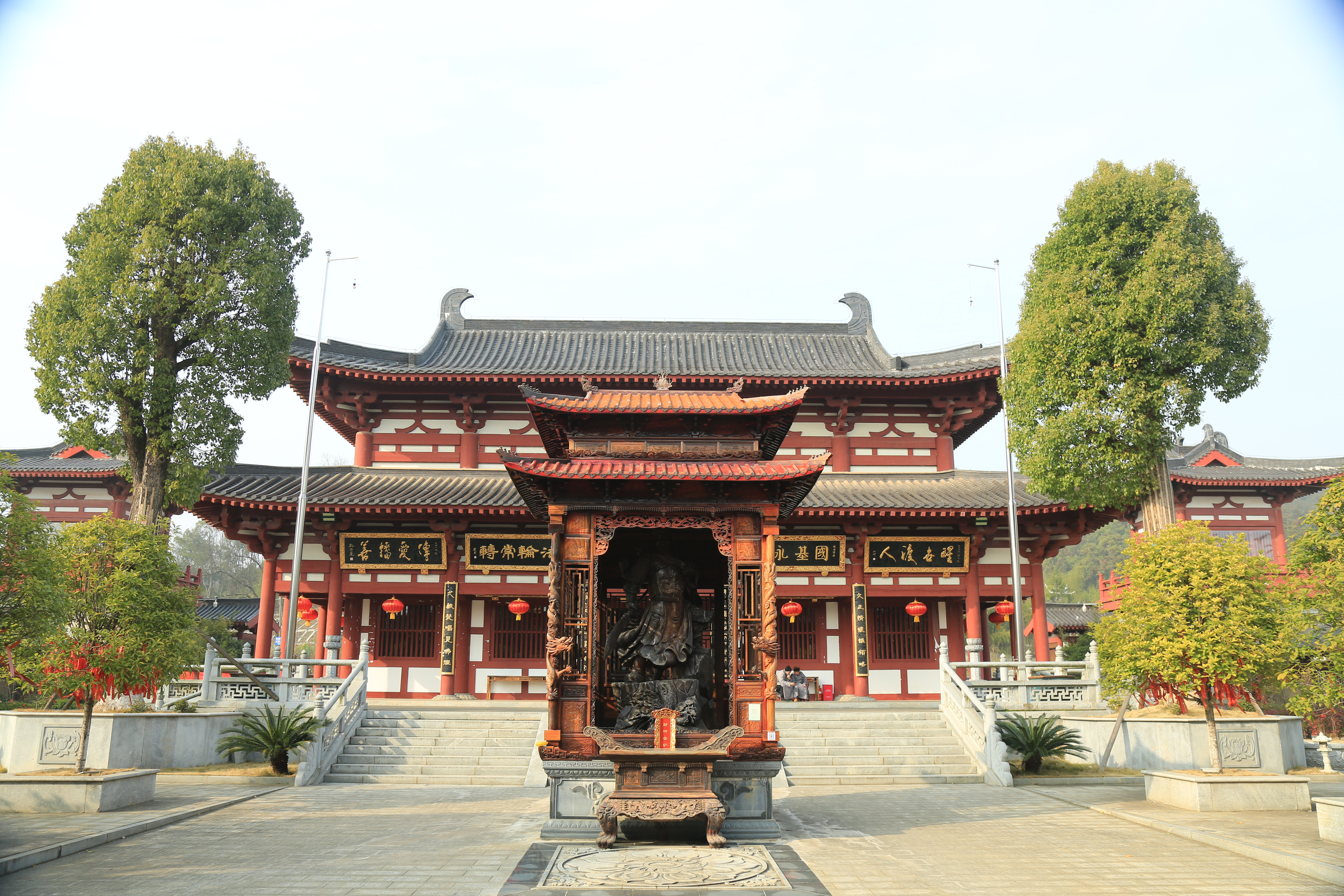
Mahavira Hall

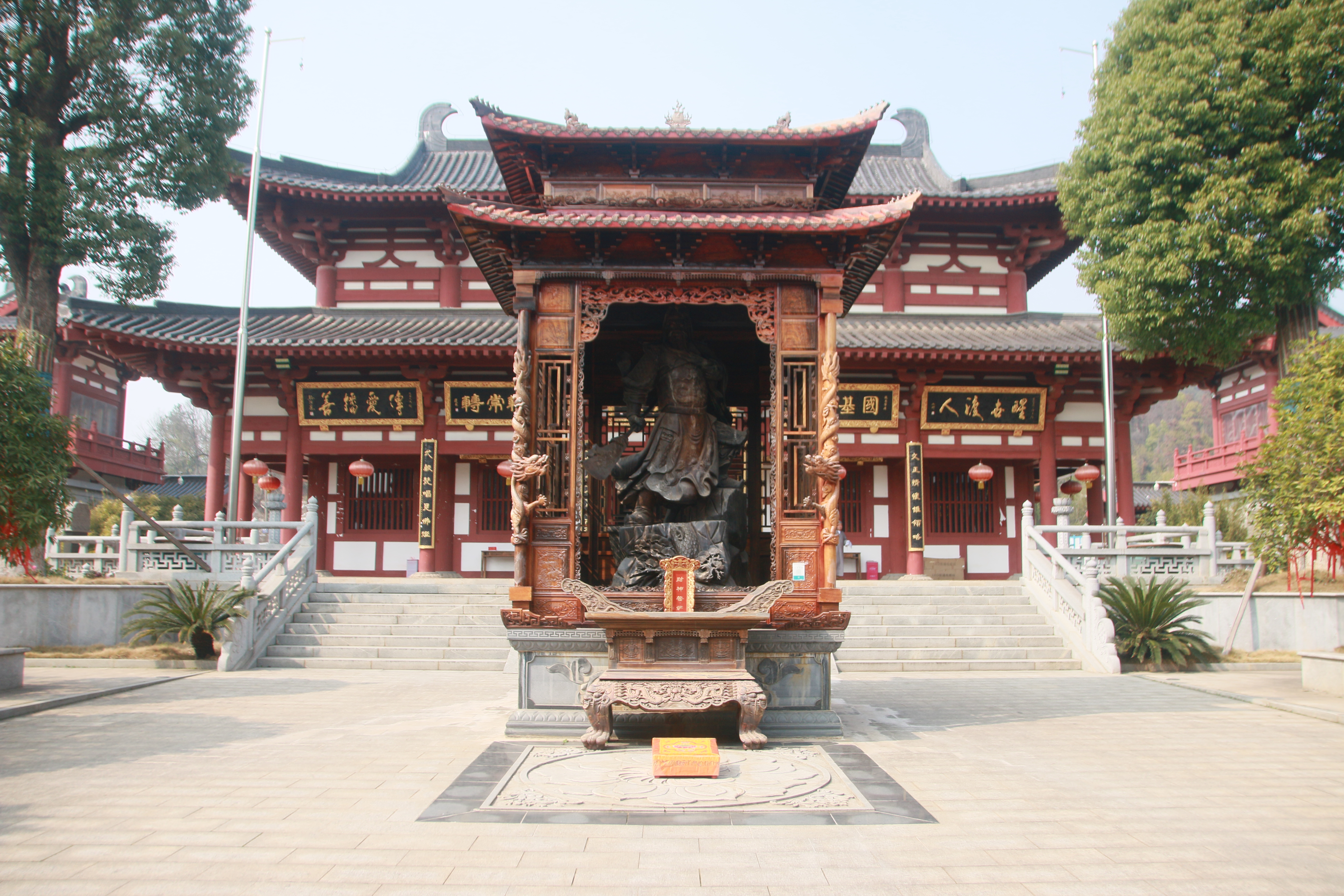
Shrine of Guan Yu

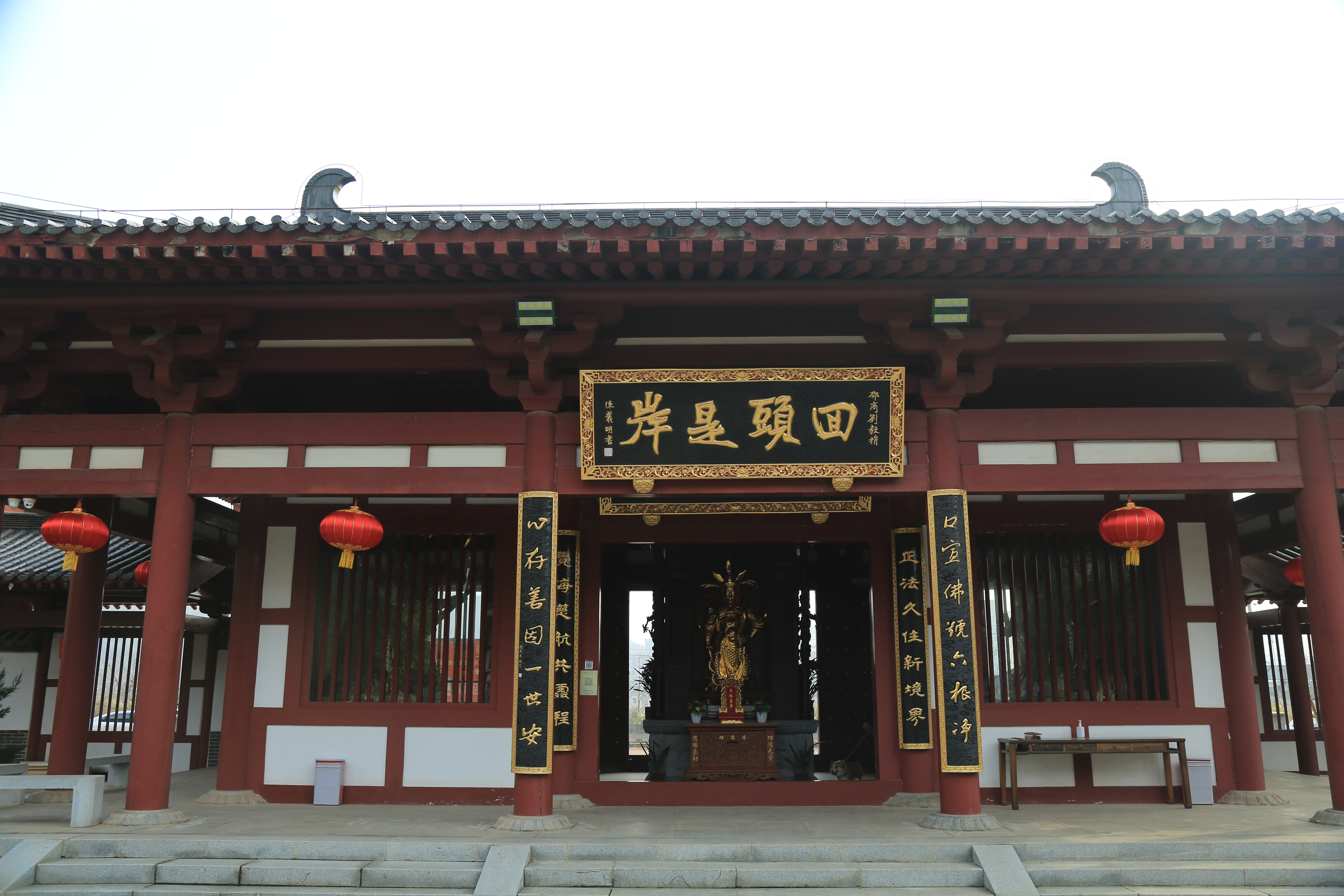
Four Heavenly Kings Hall

== Neighbouring area ==
- Tomb of Zeng Guofan
