= Wang Yue =

Wang Yue may refer to:

- Wang Yue (chess player) (born 1987)
- Wang Yue (biathlete) (born 1991), able-bodied biathlete
- Wang Yue (judoka) (born 1997)
- Wang Yue (skier) (born 1999), Paralympic skier and biathlete
- Death of Wang Yue, 2011 viral incident from Foshan, China

== See also ==
- Wangyue Subdistrict, Yuelu District, Changsha, Hunan, China
