= Meixihu =

Meixihu 梅溪湖街道
- subdistrict
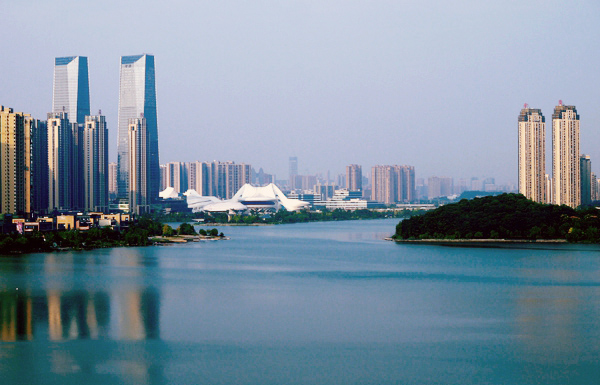
- Meixi Lake

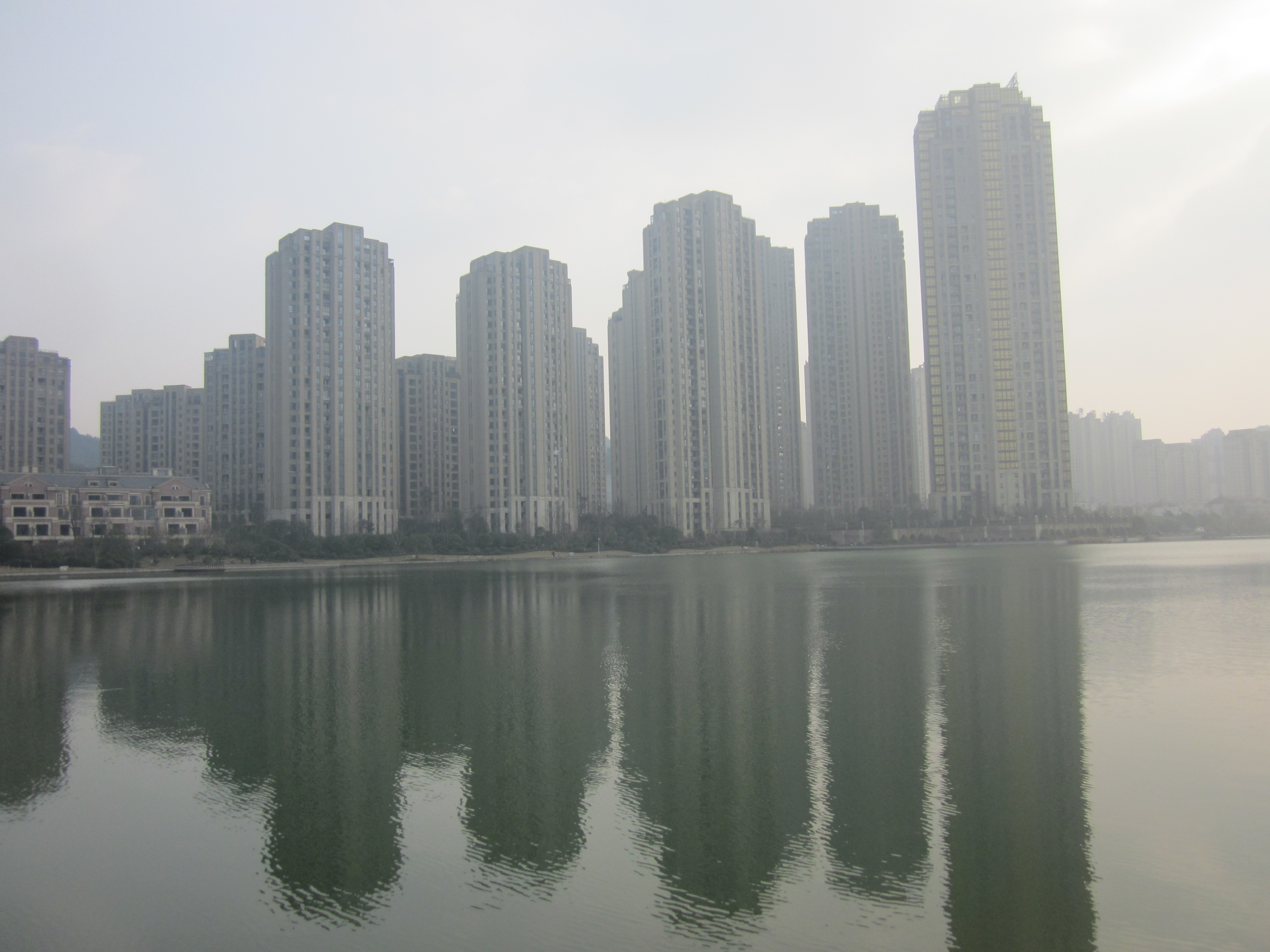
- residential buildings on the bank of Meixi Lake

- Location within Hunan
- Coordinates: 28°11′15″N 112°51′54″E
- Country: People's Republic of China
- Province: Hunan
- City: Changsha
- District: Yuelu District
- Administrative centre: Jiashun Community

Area
  - Total: 20.2 km^{2} (7.8 sq mi)

Population (2020)
  - Total: 100,138
- Time zone: UTC+8 (China Standard)
- Area code: 0731
- Languages: Standard Chinese and Changsha dialect

Meixihu Subdistrict (Chinese: 梅溪湖街道; pinyin: Méixīhú Jiēdào) is a subdistrict of Yuelu District in Changsha, Hunan, China. It was formed from a part of Tianding Township (Chinese: 天顶乡) in April 2007. In 2016, Business Insider featured a photograph of Meixihu Lake sub-district taken in 2015, highlighting it as one of the large Chinese cities described as "completely empty of people." The photographer, Kai Caemmerer, noted the unique approach to urban development in China, where cities are constructed to a near-complete state before residents are introduced, contrasting with the incremental growth typically seen in U.S. cities. By 2020, the subdistrict covered an area of 20.2 square kilometers (7.8 sq mi) and a permanent population of 100,138, with 39,025 individuals holding local household registration.

Previously in 2010, the subdistrict had a permanent population of 8,071, including 4,972 with local household registration. By 2017, the subdistrict comprised two villages and six communities under its jurisdiction. Its seat is Jiashun Community (嘉顺社区). The subdistrict is the home and the core zone of Xiangjiang New Area.

Meixihu is the key area of the pilot zone development in the west of Xiang river.

Meixihu, which means "Meixi Lake", is in Xiangjiang new district, Changsha, Hunan province, between the second and third ring roads. Meixi Lake belongs to the Peach Blossom Ridge scenic area of Yuelu mountain. The tiger-shaped mountain is like a tiger at the foot of Yuelu peak. The dragon king harbor river and a tributary flow ahead.

== History ==
On April 29, 2007, the subdistrict of Meixihu was formed from the five villages of Lianluo (联络村), Xuehu (学湖村), Zhongtang (中塘村), Tianding (天顶村) and Qitian (骑龙村), along with Yangming Shanzhuang Community (阳明山庄社区) of Tianding Township (天顶乡). The subdistrict was named after Meixi Lake, located in the middle part of its territory.

At the establishment of Meixihu Subdistrict in April 2007, it had five villages and Yangming Shanzhuang Community (阳明山庄社区) under its jurisdiction. The Runlong Community (润龙社区) was approved to form in December 2014, the subdistrict had five villages and two communities in 2015. in April 2016, the three villages of Qilong (骑龙村), Tianding (天顶村) and Xuehu (学湖村) were amalgamated to Runlong Community, the subdistrict had two villages and two communities under its jurisdiction. In December 2016, four new communities of Jinmao (金茂社区), Meiyuan (梅园社区), Jiashun (嘉顺社区) and Qilong (骑龙社区) were approved to establish and formally formed in March 2017, the subdistrict of Meixihu has two villages and six communities under its jurisdiction after 2017.

The population of the subdistrict has grown significantly since its establishment, reaching 100,138 permanent residents in 2020, including 39,025 with household registration. Among the permanent residents, 25,332 were aged 0–14, 69,065 were aged 15–64, and 5,741 were over the age of 65.

Earlier population figures reported for 2010, 2011, and 2017 were 8,071, 12,600, and 30,776, respectively.

Population history of Meixuhu
Year	Pop.	±%
2010	8,071	—
2011	12,600	+56.1%
2017	30,776	+144.3%
2020	100,138	+225.4%

== Landscape ==
=== Meixihu music fountain ===
The Changsha Meixihu music fountain is one of the large music fountains in China and also the longest music fountain in Asia. In February 2013, the music fountain of Meixihu in Changsha was put into use. Meixihu music fountain is located on the water surface between Meixihu International New Town Festival Island and the Culture and Art Center, directly opposite Jinmao Mansions. It is 460 meters long and 30 meters high. It runs through an arc of four circular groups, with a total of 200 3D sprinkler heads, four large lasers and 1000 LED lights.

=== Changsha Meixihu International Culture and Arts Center ===
The Changsha Meixihu International Culture and Arts Center is located in Changsha, with a total investment of 2.8 billion yuan, a total land area of 100,000 square meters, and a total construction area of 120,000 square meters, including 48,000 square meters of the grand theater and 45,000 square meters of the art museum two main functions. The grand theatre consists of 1,800 main performance halls and 500 multi-functional small theatres. The museum consists of nine exhibition halls with an area of 10,000 square meters. It is built to accommodate large operas, dance dramas, symphonies and other performances.

The International Culture and Arts Center is the most complete culture center in Hunan province, filling the gap of the city and the province's high-end culture and art platform.

=== Qi-fu avenue ===
Qi-fu avenue is located in the Huahu Road of Meixi Lake International New Town, adjacent to the Peach Blossom Ridge scenic spot in the south, and Liuti in the north. It was completed at the end of 2012. It has a length of 400 meters, a height of 4.8 meters and a span of 18 meters. It is divided into four parts, all of which are steel frame structures. At present is the annual Meixi Lake international light festival and Lantern Festival, Meixi Lake flower art exhibition main attractions. In the light festival of 2013, it was decorated with lanterns, fish, umbrellas, wind chimes and other shaped lamps at the top of the four corridors, and accompanied by festive music. It became a tourist attraction during the light festival. It is also used a filming location for TV programs, films and TV dramas.

== Eco-city of Meixihu ==
=== Introduced the program ===
Relying on Meixihu, Changsha city government will vigorously develop high-end services such as research and development, finance, business, exhibition and tourism. The industrial development of the whole city insists on high-end development and nurtures and strengthens "two-oriented" industrial clusters. The development of national innovation-oriented science and technology parks is promoted in high-tech zones, forming high-end industrial clusters. Meixihu new city will develop the new city service industry by relying on the high-tech industries around the city (electronic information, advanced manufacturing, new materials, new energy, energy conservation, environmental protection, bio-pharmaceutical, advanced manufacturing, creative design, etc.), human resources (Central South University, Hunan University, Changsha University of science and technology, etc.) and other resources.

=== Low-carbon environmental goals ===
The main energy consumption links in the buildings around Meixihu, such as heat and cold sources, transmission and distribution systems, lighting, office equipment and hot water consumption, are measured separately, and the property is recorded regularly. Itemized measurement shall comply with the technical guidelines for the design and installation of itemized measurement for buildings with energy consumption monitoring system for state organs and large public buildings. For public buildings with centralized air conditioning system, cold and heat metering devices should be set up in different floors, indoor areas, users or rooms. Cold and heat metering devices shall be installed in each public building and its cold and heat station.

=== New planning ===
Meixihu new city adheres to the principle of sustainable development and carries out the planning and design of Mwixihu new city according to the following principles: reduce the carbon emission caused by internal transportation through compact and easy walking hybrid society; provide adequate employment opportunities through self-sufficient urban centres; create a zero-carbon and low-carbon transport hierarchy through green transport systems; reduce carbon emissions through the use of passive design; through the integration of green space and water system, provide a comfortable environment and reduce the urban heat island effect.

== Tour route ==
- Parent-child route: Ginkgo Park — Language of the Wind Square — Festival Island
- Lovers route: central green axis — Peach Blossom Ridge scenic spot — Language of the Wind Square — Festival Island
- Half day (morning) route: Festival Island — Language of the Wind Square — Meiling Park — Ginkgo Park
- Half day (afternoon) route: Peach Blossom Ridge scenic area — central green axis — Festival Island — Meixihu music fountain
- One day route: central green axis — Peach Blossom Ridge scenic spot — Ginkgo Park — Meiling Park — Language of the Wind Square — Meixihu music fountain

== Subdivisions ==
In 2017 the subdistrict of Meixihu had two villages and six communities under its jurisdiction.

2 villages

- Lianluo Village (联络村)
- Zhongtang Village (中塘村)

6 communities

- Jiashun Community (嘉顺社区)
- Jinmao Community (金茂社区)
- Meiyuan Community (梅园社区)
- Qilong Community (骑龙社区)
- Runlong Community (润龙社区)
- Yangming Shanzhuang Community (阳明山庄社区)
