= Dongfanghong Subdistrict =

Dongfanghong 东方红街道
- subdistrict
- Location within Hunan
- Coordinates: 28°14′26″N 112°52′02″E
- Country: People's Republic of China
- Province: Hunan
- City: Changsha
- District: Yuelu District

Area
  - Total: 16.6 km^{2} (6.4 sq mi)

Population (2017)
  - Total: 45,000
- Time zone: UTC+8 (China Standard)
- Area code: 0731
- Languages: Standard Chinese and Changsha dialect

Dongfanghong Subdistrict (simplified Chinese: 东方红街道; traditional Chinese: 東方紅街道; pinyin: Dōngfānghóng Jiēdào) is a subdistrict of Yuelu District in Changsha, Hunan, China. It is historically the territory of state-owned Dongfanghong Farm. The subdistrict has an area of 16.6 square kilometres (6.4 sq mi) with a household population of 45,000 (as of 2017). The subdistrict has three villages and a community under its jurisdiction.

== History ==
In 2006, the villages of Jinnan and Hualong of Huangjin Township (黄金乡), Heyeba Village of Leifeng Town (雷峰镇) were transferred to the town of Dongfanghong (东方红镇), Yuelu District from Wangcheng County (望城县). The town of Dongfanghong was amalgamated to Lugu Subdistrict on November 19, 2015. On March 1, 2017, the subdistrict of Dongfanghong was reformed from a community and three villages of Lugu Subdistrict.

== Subdivisions ==
The subdistrict of Dongfanghong was formed from Lugu Subdistrict on March 1, 2017. It has a community (Jianshanhu / 尖山湖社区) and three villages - Heyeba (荷叶坝村), Hualong (华龙村) and Jinnan (金南村) - under its jurisdiction.
