= Lugu Subdistrict =

Lugu 麓谷街道
- Subdistrict
- Location within Hunan
- Coordinates: 28°13′09″N 112°53′21″E
- Country: People's Republic of China
- Province: Hunan
- City: Changsha
- District: Yuelu District
- Divisions: 13 communities

Area
  - Total: 37.15 km^{2} (14.34 sq mi)

Population (2015)
  - Total: 159,000
  - Density: 4,280/km^{2} (11,100/sq mi)
- Time zone: UTC+8 (China Standard)
- Area code: 0731
- Languages: Standard Chinese and Changsha dialect

Lugu Subdistrict (or Luvalley; Chinese: 麓谷街道; pinyin: lù-gǔ jiēdào) is an urban subdistrict of Yuelu District in Changsha City, Hunan Province, China. Historically the former State-owned Dongfanghong Farm of Changsha (长沙国营东方红农场) was in the territory of today's Lugu Subdistrict. The subdistrict is home and the core area of Changsha High-Tech Industrial Development Zone, it is dubbed "Luvalley" (Chinese: 麓谷; lit. 'Yuelu Mountain valley').

The subdistrict of Dongfanghong was reformed from part of Lugu Subidstrict on March 1, 2017. Lugu has an area of 21.6 square kilometres (8.3 sq mi) with a household population of 270,000. The subdistrict has 12 communities under its jurisdiction.

== History ==
Lugu Subdistrict was formed by dividing four communities of the historic Dongfanghong Town in March 2010. Yule District was formed in 1996, meanwhile the state-owned Dongfanghong Farm of the historic Suburb District was added to Yule District. The state-owned Dongfanghong Farm (东方红农场) was reorganized to Dongfanghong Town (东方红镇) in 2000. Heyeba village (荷叶坝村) of Leifeng Subdistrict, Jinnan (金南村) and Hualong villages (华龙村) of Huangjin Town (黄金镇) of the historic Wangcheng County were also added to Yule District, the three villages became parts of Dongfanghong Town in 2006. The former Lugu Subdistrict and Dongfanghong Town were merged to reform the present Lugu Subdistrict on 19 November 2015. In 2016, the subdistrict is divided into 13 communities and three villages.

Dongfanghong Subdistrict was reformed from the former Lugu Subidstrict on March 1, 2017. Lugu has an area of 21.6 square kilometres (8.3 sq mi) with a population of about 270,000. It has 12 communities under its jurisdiction.

== Subdivision ==
- Changfeng Community (长丰社区)
- Changqing Community (长庆社区)
- Dongtang Community (东塘社区)
- Hexinyuan Community (和馨园社区)
- Jinxiu Community (锦绣社区)
- Juyuan Community (桔苑社区)
- Lufeng Community (麓丰社区)
- Lujing Community (麓景社区)
- Luquan Community (麓泉社区)
- Luyuan Community (麓源社区)
- Xiangyang Community (向阳社区)
- Yannong Community (延农社区)
