= Xueshi =

Xueshi 学士街道
- subdistrict
- Location within Hunan
- Coordinates: 28°07′16″N 112°52′19″E
- Country: People's Republic of China
- Province: Hunan
- City: Changsha
- District: Yuelu District

Area
  - Total: 42.28 km^{2} (16.32 sq mi)

Population (2017)
  - Total: 72,000
- Time zone: UTC+8 (China Standard)
- Area code: 0731
- Languages: Standard Chinese and Changsha dialect

Xueshi Subdistrict (simplified Chinese: 学士街道; traditional Chinese: 學士街道; pinyin: Xuéshì Jiēdào) is a subdistrict of Yuelu District in Changsha, Hunan, China. It is historically the territory of Xueshi Township (学士乡), Wangcheng County in 1994. The subdistrict has an area of 42.28 square kilometres (16.32 sq mi) with a permanent resident population of about 72,000 (as of 2017). The subdistrict has three villages and six communities under its jurisdiction.

== History ==
In 589 AD, Linxiang County was renamed to Changsha County, today's Xueshi Subdistrict was part of Changsha County. From the year 1098 AD, Shanhua County (善化县) was established from Changsha County, by 1912, Shanhua was incorporated into Changsha County, it belonged to Shanhua County.

In May 1951, Wangcheng County was established from part of Changsha County and Xueshi Township belonged to the 4th District of Wangcheng County. As the Revocation of Districts and Amalgamation of Townships (撤区并乡) in June 1956, the former Pingguan District (坪观区) was divided into four townships as Xueshi Township. As the Revocation of Townships and Establishment of Communes (撤乡建社) in October 1958, Xueshi Township was merged into the Pingtang People's Commune (坪塘人民公社), Wangcheng County was formally merged to Changsha County in March 1959 and Pingtang was a district of Changsha County. As administrative divisions of a county, county controlled districts were reorganized in July 1961 and the Pingtang District (坪塘区) of Changsha County was established, meanwhile the size of the communes was reduced and Xueshi Commune (学士公社) was formed from Pingtang Commune. In December 1962, Lianhua District (莲花区) was created from part of Pingtang District, the Xueshi Commune still belonged to Pingtang District. In January 1978, Wangcheng County was rebuilt and Xueshi was in the territory of Wangcheng County. In March 1984, the commune of Xueshi was reorganized to a township, the township of Xueshi governed 10 villages of Baihe (白鹤), Banma (斑马), Changfeng (长丰), Chijiang (赤江), Dongshan (东山), Juntang (均塘), Tangxia (塘峡), Xueshi (学士), Yuhua (玉华) and Zhatang (渣塘).

As the Revocation of Districts and Amalgamation of Townships (撤区并乡) in June 1995, the township of Xueshi (学士乡) was merged into Jiujiang Township, the township of Jiujiang had 23 villages with a total area of 91.8 square kilometers, its seat was in Liqiao Village (栗桥村). In February 1998, the township of Jiujiang was reorganized into the town of Hanpu. As the Amalgamation of Village-level Divisions (村级合并) of Wangcheng County in 2004, the divisions of Hanpu was reduced to 12 (2 communities and 10 villages) from 24 (a community and 23 villages). On June 15, 2008, the town of Hanpu was transferred from Wangcheng County to Yuelu District. On August 3, 2012, the town of Hanpu was officially reorganized to a subdistrict.

On January 18, 2013, the former Hanpu Subdistrict was converted to the two subdistricts of Hanpu and Xueshi. The subdistrict of Xueshi had a community (Baihe Community), and four villages of Lianfeng (联丰村), Xueshi (学士村), Yujiang (玉江村) and Dongshanwan (东山湾村) with an area of 42.28 square kilometers.

== Subdivisions ==
By 2017, the subdistrict of Xueshi has three villages and six communities under its jurisdiction.

3 villages

- Lianfeng Village (联丰村)
- Xuehua Village (学华村)
- Xuetai Village (学泰村)

6 communities

- Baihe Community (白鹤社区)
- Banmatang Community (斑马塘社区)
- Xue'an Community (学安社区)
- Xuelian Community (学联社区)
- Xuejin Community (学锦社区)
- Xueshiqiao Community (学士桥社区)
