= Hanpu Subdistrict =

Hanpu 含浦街道
- subdistrict
- Location within Hunan
- Coordinates: 28°06′01″N 112°51′22″E
- Country: People's Republic of China
- Province: Hunan
- Prefecture-level city: Changsha
- District: Yuelu District

Area
  - Total: 51.17 km^{2} (19.76 sq mi)

Population (2017)
  - Total: 50,000
- Time zone: UTC+8 (China Standard)
- Area code: 0731
- Languages: Standard Chinese and Changsha dialect

Hanpu Subdistrict (Chinese: 含浦街道; pinyin: Hánpǔ Jiēdào) is a subdistrict of Yuelu District in Changsha, Hunan, China. It is historically the territory of Jiujiang Township (九江乡), Wangcheng County in 1994. The subdistrict has an area of 51.17 square kilometres (19.76 sq mi) with a registered population of 24,900 (as of 2017). The subdistrict has four villages and a community under its jurisdiction. Its seat is Hantai Community (含泰社区).

== History ==
In 589 AD, Linxiang County was renamed to Changsha County, today's Hanpu Subdistrict was part of Changsha County. From the year 1098 AD, Shanhua County (善化县) was established from Changsha County, by 1912, Shanhua was incorporated into Changsha County, it belonged to Shanhua County. Hanpu was the former Fulong Town (伏龙镇) of Changsha County in 1912 and it was part of the 10th District of Changsha County in 1930.

Through the Revocation of Districts and Amalgamation of Townships (撤区并乡) in 1938, it was relocated to the place as the townships of Hanpu (含浦乡) and Cahngle (长乐乡). In March 1950, the township of Jiujiang (九江乡) was reformed in the 13th District of Changsha County. In May 1951, Wangcheng County was established from part of Changsha County and Jiujiang Township belonged to the 4th District of Wangcheng County. In May 1953, the size of the townships were reduced, the subdistrict of Jiujiang was historically the territories of townships of Jiujiang (九江乡), Yunpan (云盘乡), Fengtian (丰田乡), Jianzi (鉴子乡) and Dapo (大坡乡) in the 8th District (Pingguan District) of Wangcheng County. As the Revocation of Districts and Amalgamation of Townships (撤区并乡) in June 1956, the former Pingguan District (坪观区) was divided into four townships as Jiujiang Township.

As the Revocation of Townships and Establishment of Communes (撤乡建社) in October 1958, Jiujiang Township was merged into the Pingtang People's Commune (坪塘人民公社), Wangcheng County was formally merged to Changsha County in March 1959 and Pingtang was a district of Changsha County. As administrative divisions of a county, county controlled districts were reorganized in July 1961 and the Pingtang District (坪塘区) of Changsha County was established, meanwhile the size of the communes was reduced and Jiujiang Commune (九江公社) was formed from Pingtang Commune. In December 1962, Lianhua District (莲花区) was created from part of Pingtang District, the Jiujiang Commune still belonged to Pingtang District. In January 1978, Wangcheng County was rebuilt and Jiujiang was in the territory of Wangcheng County.

In March 1984, the commune of Jiujiang was reorganized to a township, the township of Jiujiang governed 13 villages of Jiujiang (九江), Jianzi (鉴子), Yunpan (云盘), Zhizi (之字), Dongtinggou (洞庭沟), Guanbukou (官埠口), Hanpu (含浦), Dapo (大坡), Liqiao (栗桥), Lishushan (栗树山), Qujiang (曲江), Fengtian (丰田) and Huatang (花塘).

As the Revocation of Districts and Amalgamation of Townships (撤区并乡) in June 1995, the township of Xueshi (学士乡) was merged into Jiujiang Township, the township of Jiujiang had 23 villages with a total area of 91.8 square kilometers, its seat was in Liqiao Village (栗桥村).

In February 1998, the township of Jiujiang was reorganized into the town of Hanpu. Hanpu Town governed a community and 23 villages with a total area of 91.8 square kilometers. As the Amalgamation of Village-level Divisions (村级合并) of Wangcheng County in 2004, the divisions of Hanpu was reduced to 12 (2 communities and 10 villages) from 24 (a community and 23 villages).

On June 15, 2008, the town of Hanpu was transferred from Wangcheng County to Yuelu District. On August 3, 2012, the town of Hanpu was officially reorganized to a subdistrict. On January 18, 2013, the former Hanpu Subdistrict was converted to the two subdistricts of Hanpu and Xueshi. The newly established Hanpu Subdistrict had a community (Hanpu Community), six villages of Guanbukou, Xintian, Jiujiang, Dapo, Zhizigang and Ganzi with an area of 49.6 square kilometers, Hanpu Community (含浦社区) was its seat. As a new round of the Amalgamation of Village-level Divisions (村级合并) in 2016, the former Hanpu community and the Guanbukou Village were merged to form Hantai Community, the two villages of Xintian and Jiujiang were merged to form Jiufeng Village, its divisions were reduced to five from seven, it has a community and four villages under its jurisdiction, its seat is Hantai Community.

== Subdivisions ==
On January 18, 2013, the former Hanpu Subdistrict was divided into the two subdistricts of Hanpu and Xueshi. The newly established Hanpu Subdistrict had a community and six villages with an area of 49.6 square kilometers. As a new round of the Amalgamation of Village-level Divisions (Chinese: 村级合并) in 2016, the divisions of Hanpu Subdistrict were reduced to five from seven, it has a community and four villages under its jurisdiction.

4 villages

- Dapo Village (Chinese: 大坡村)
- Ganzi Village (Chinese: 干子村) also called Jianzi Village (Chinese: 鉴子村)
- Jiufeng Village (Chinese: 九丰村)
- Zhizigang Village (Chinese: 芝字港村)

a community

- Hantai community (Chinese: 含泰社区)
