= Longping High-Tech Park =

Industrial park in Changsha, China

Longping High-Tech Park (Chinese: 隆平高科技园) is a high tech industrial park at state level in Furong District of Changsha City, Hunan Province, China, one of four industrial parks of Changsha High-Tech Industrial Development Zone. The industrial park is the original Mapoling Agricultural High-Tech Park (Chinese: 马坡岭农业高科技园), which was one of two high-tech agricultural parks approved by the former State Science and Technology Commission in 1997. It was changed to Longping Agricultural High-Tech Park (Chinese: 隆平农业高科技园) in October 2000 and to the present name in November 2003. It is named after the agronomist and hybrid rice expert Yuan Longping.

Longping High-Tech Park has an area of 18 km^{2} (6.9 sq mi). In 2015, the total industrial output value of the park is CNY 40.5 billion (US$6.5 billion), the total service and business income of enterprises is CNY 55 billion (US$8.83 billion). As of November 2016, there are 728 enterprises, 493 of that are service-oriented enterprises.
