= Tianding =

Tianding 天顶街道
- subdistrict
- Location within Hunan
- Coordinates: 28°12′06″N 112°53′21″E
- Country: People's Republic of China
- Province: Hunan
- City: Changsha
- District: Yuelu District
- Administrative centre: Chuantang Community

Area
  - Total: 20.86 km^{2} (8.05 sq mi)

Population (2012)
  - Total: 56,800
- Time zone: UTC+8 (China Standard)
- Area code: 0731
- Languages: Standard Chinese and Changsha dialect

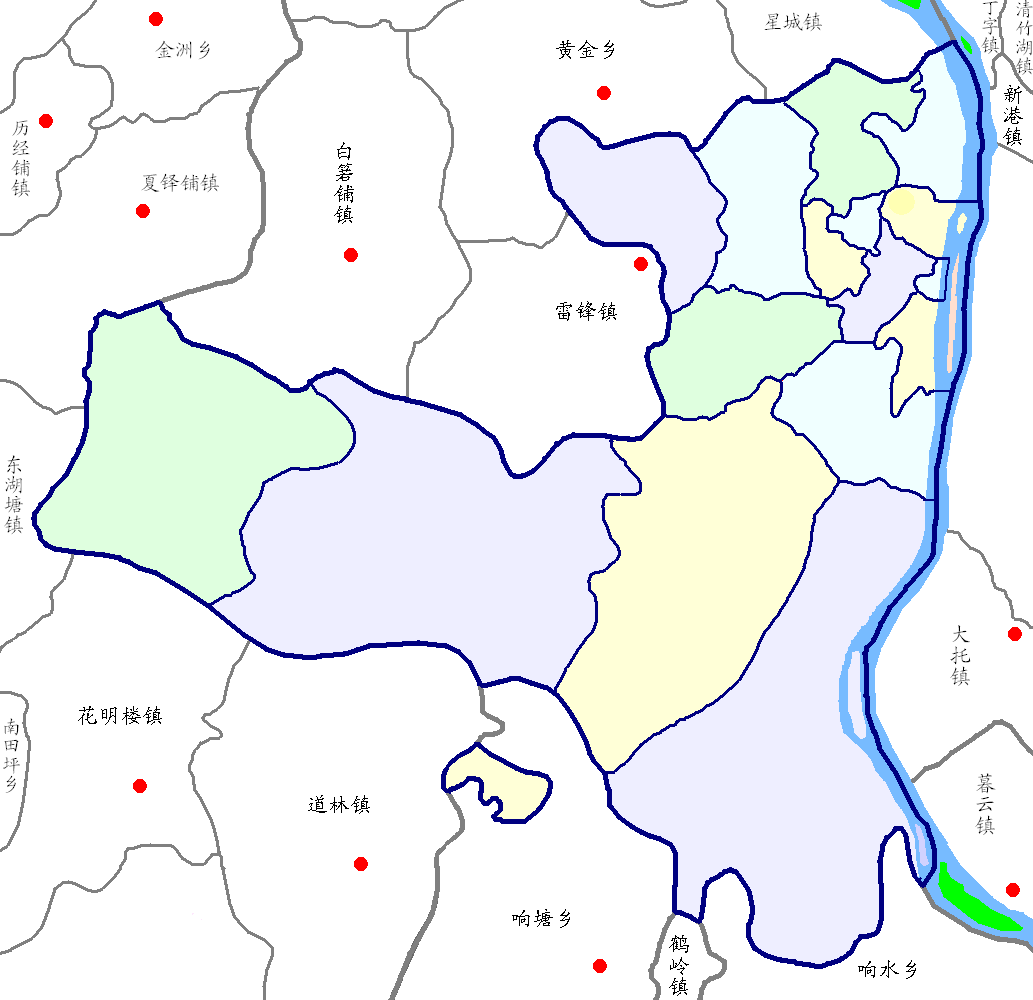
Map of Yuelu district, Changsha, Hunan

Tianding Subdistrict (Chinese: 天顶街道; pinyin: Tiāndǐng Jiēdào) is a subdistrict of Yuelu District in Changsha, Hunan, China. It was reorganized to a subdistrict from the former Tianding Township (天顶乡) in August 2012. The subdistrict has an area of 20.86 square kilometres (8.05 sq mi) with a population of 56,800 (as of 2012).

== History ==
In 1962, Tianding Commune (天顶公社) was organized from Wangyue Commune (望岳公社) and it was placed under the jurisdiction of Bairuo District (白箬区) in Changsha County. In January 1978, the commune of Tianding was under jurisdiction of Bairuo District in Wangcheng County (望城县) with the restoration of Wangcheng County from Changsha County. In March 1984, the township of Tianding was re-established in place of Tianding Commune, the township had 14 villages under the jurisdiction with a total area of 41.7 square kilometers. Tianding Township was transferred to Yuelu District from Wangcheng County with the adjustment of districts of Changsha in July 1996.

In January 1998, the two villages of Wangxin (望新村) and Jiantang (涧塘村) were assigned to Wangchengpo Subdistrict (望城坡街道) with its establishment. The division of Tianding Township was reduced from the original 14 villages to 12 villages.

In May 2004, five villages in the southern part were changed to Wangchengpo Economic Development Zone (Meixihu Management Committee) under its trusteeship. In 2007, the subdistrict of Meixihu was approved to establish from five villages of Lianluo (联络村), Xuehu (学湖村), Zhongtang (中塘村), Tianding (天顶村) and Qitian (骑龙村), and Yangming Shanzhuang Community (阳明山庄社区) of Tianding Township.

In August 2012, the township of Tianding was reorganized as a subdistrict, the subdistrict of Tianding covers an area of 20.86 square kilometers with a population of 58,600, it was divided seven villages and a community in the year, of which were Hangtian Community (航天社区), seven villages of Jianshan (尖山村), Yong'an (永安村), Yanzishan (燕子山村), Qingshui (清水村), Yanlian (燕联村), Chuantang (川塘村) and Qingshan (青山村).

In 2016, the 2 villages of Jianshan and Qingshan were merged to establish Jianqing Xincun Village (尖青新村), the 2 villages of Yong'an and Yanzishan as Yongyan Xincun Village (永燕新村), the 2 villages of Yanlian and Qingshui as Yanqing Xincun Village (燕清新村), and the village of Chuantang (川塘村) was reorganized as the community of Chuantang (川塘社区).

== Subdivisions ==
By 2017, the subdistrict of Tianding has a village and eight communities under its jurisdiction.

8 communities

- Chuantang Community (川塘社区)
- Hangtian Community (航天社区)
- Jianshan Community (尖山社区)
- Qingshan Xincun Community (青山新村社区)
- Qingshui Community (清水社区)
- Xinghu Community (星湖社区)
- Yanlian Community (燕联社区)
- Yongheng Community (永恒社区)

a village

- Yongyan Xincun Village (永燕新村)
