= Guanshaling =

Subdistrict in Changsha, Hunan, China

Guanshaling Subdistrict 观沙岭街道
- Subdistrict
- Location within Hunan
- Coordinates: 28°13′57″N 112°57′07″E
- Country: People's Republic of China
- Province: Hunan
- City: Changsha
- District: Yuelu District
- Administrative centre: Juzhou Xinyuan
- (Chinese): 桔洲新苑社区
- Divisions: 9 communities and 3 villages

Area
  - Total: 14.17 km^{2} (5.47 sq mi)

Population (2010 census)
  - Total: 51,324
  - Density: 3,622/km^{2} (9,381/sq mi)
- Time zone: UTC+8 (China Standard)
- Area code: 0731
- Languages: Standard Chinese and Changsha dialect

Guanshaling Subdistrict (simplified Chinese: 观沙岭街道; traditional Chinese: 觀沙嶺街道; pinyin: Guānshālǐng Jiēdào) is a subdistrict of Yuelu District in Changsha, Hunan, China. The subdistrict has an area of about 14.17 km^{2} (5.47 sq mi) with a population of 51,324 (as of 2010 census). The subdistrict of Guanshaling has three villages and 13 communities under its jurisdiction, with its administrative office at Juzhou Xinyuan Community (桔洲新苑社区).

== History ==
The local Chinese word "Guansha" (观沙) means "Looking at Changsha", "Ling" (岭) means "hill" or "mount." In the old days, it was a hillock in the place close to the Xiang River, Changsha City can be seen here, it was named after that. The subdistrict was established from a portion of the former Yuelushan Township in 1998.

== Geography ==
Guanshaling is located in the northeastern corner of Yuelu District. It is bordered by Yueliangdao Subdistrict of Wangcheng District to the north, Wangyue Subdistrict to the west, Yinpenling Subdistrict to the south, and the Xiang River to the east.

== Subdivisions ==
The subdistrict of Guanshaling has nine communities and three villages under its jurisdiction.

9 communities

- Changwang community (Chinese: 长望社区)
- Jinling Community (Chinese: 金岭社区)
- Juzhou Xinyuan Community (Chinese: 桔洲新苑社区)
- Sanchaji Community (Chinese: 三汊矶社区)
- Shijiagang Community (Chinese: 施家港社区)
- Shilingtang Community (Chinese: 石岭塘社区)
- Tucheng Community (Chinese: 土城社区)
- Yuebei Community (Chinese: 岳北社区)
- Yulong Community (Chinese: 钰龙社区)

3 villages

- Chazishan Village (Chinese: 茶子山村)
- Guanshaling Village (Chinese: 观沙岭村)
- Yuehua Village (Chinese: 岳华村)
