= Xihu Subdistrict =

Xihu 西湖街道
- subdistrict
- Location within Hunan
- Coordinates: 28°11′54″N 112°56′19″E
- Country: People's Republic of China
- Province: Hunan
- City: Changsha
- District: Yuelu District

Area
  - Total: 10 km^{2} (3.9 sq mi)

Population
  - Total: 46,000
  - Density: 4,600/km^{2} (12,000/sq mi)
- Time zone: UTC+8 (China Standard)
- Area code: 0731
- Languages: Standard Chinese and Changsha dialect
- Website: http://www.yuelu.gov.cn/xhjd/

Xihu Subdistrict (Chinese: 西湖街道; pinyin: Xīhú Jiēdào) is a subdistrict of Yuelu District in Changsha, Hunan, China. It was formed in 1998. The subdistrict has an area of about 10 square kilometres (3.9 sq mi) with a population of about 46,000. The subdistrict has eight communities and two villages under its jurisdiction.

== History ==
The subdistrict of Xihu was reorganized from the former Xihu Fishery Farm (Chinese: 西湖渔场) in 1998. The state-owned fishery farm of Xihu was established from Xianjiahu Brigade (Chinese: 咸家湖大队), Wangluqiao Brigade (Chinese: 望麓桥大队), part of Lushan Brigade (Chinese: 麓山大队) in Yuelushan Commune (Chinese: 岳麓山公社), and part of Wangyue Brigade (Chinese: 望岳大队) in Wangyue Commune (Chinese: 望岳公社) in December 1973.
