= Juzizhou =

Juzizhou 橘子洲街道
- subdistrict
- Location within Hunan
- Coordinates: 28°11′33″N 112°57′08″E
- Country: People's Republic of China
- Province: Hunan
- City: Changsha
- District: Yuelu District

Area
  - Total: 16.02 km^{2} (6.19 sq mi)

Population (2017)
  - Total: 168,000
- Time zone: UTC+8 (China Standard)
- Area code: 0731
- Languages: Standard Chinese and Changsha dialect
- Website: http://www.yuelu.gov.cn/jzzjd/

Juzizhou Subdistrict (Chinese: 橘子洲街道; pinyin: Júzizhōu Jiēdào) is a subdistrict of Yuelu District in Changsha, Hunan, China. It is historically the Shuiluzhou Subdistrict (simplified Chinese: 水陆洲街道; traditional Chinese: 水陸洲街道; pinyin: Shuǐlùzhōu Jiēdào) formed in 1950s. The subdistrict has an area of 16.02 square kilometres (6.19 sq mi) with a permanent resident population of about 168,000 (as of 2017). The subdistrict has two villages and eight communities under its jurisdiction.

The subdistrict of Juzizhou is located on the east side of Yuelu Mountain and on the west bank of Xiang River. It starts from the Orange Isle in the east and reaches the Yuelu Mountain ridge in the west, connects to the South Campus of Hunan Normal University in the south, and reaches the Juzizhou Bridge (橘子洲大桥) and Fenglin No.1 Road (枫林一路) in the north. There are Yuelu Mountain, Orange Isle, Yuelu Academy, the site of Xinmin Institute (新民学会) and other tourist attractions. There are key universities such as Hunan University and Hunan Normal University. There are National Supercomputing Center in Changsha (国家超级计算长沙中心), Hunan Academy of Chinese Medicine (湖南省中医药研究院), the Changsha Research Institute of Mining and metallurgy (长沙矿冶研究院), Hunan provincial Agency of Democratic Parties, and the Fourth Hospital of Changsha (长沙市第四医院) and other health research institutions.

== History ==
The subdistrict of Juzizhou was originally called Shuiluzhou Subdistrict (Chinese: 水陆洲街道). It was designated as Yuelu District in the early 1950s. In 1953, the Minzhu Jianzheng Subdistrict (Chinese: 民主建政街道) was transferred from Yuelu District to the West District (Chinese: 西区). in March 1960, the Xianfeng People's Commune (Chinese: 先锋人民公社) was established in the West District and the Shuiluzhou Office (Chinese: 水陆洲办事处) was named to the sixth branch (Chinese: 第六分社) of Xianfeng People's Commune. In September 1961, the urban people's commune was revoked and the name of Shuiluzhou Office was restored. In 1968, the isle of Shuilu (Shuilu Zhou) was renamed to Orange Isle (Juzi Zhou), and the subdistrict of Juzizhou was established in the Orange Isle. In 1972, the subdistrict was transferred to Yuelu District from the West District. In 1975, the districts of Yuelu and West were amalgamated to form West District, which was under the jurisdiction of the West District.

Adjusting districts in July 1996, the West District (Chinese: 西区) was abolished, it was replaced by Yuelu District, the subdistrict was under the jurisdiction of Yuelu District. At the beginning of its establishment, the subdistrict's office was located at No.10, Juzhou Xincun Village (north of the Juzizhou Bridge), and it was co-located with the police station. When the Juzizhou Bridge (Chinese: 橘子洲大桥) was built in 1970, its office of the district was demolished. In 1972, its office was moved to No.88, Juzhou Zhongcun Village (Chinese: 桔洲中村), south of the branch bridge (borrowed from the Catholic Church). In September 1993, its office was moved from the Orange Isle to No.99 Xinmin Road (Chinese: 新民路) on the west bank of Xiang River. The office building was started in 1992 and covered an area of 1.5 mu (10 square hectometres (25 acres)) with a building area of 1,497 square metres (16,110 sq ft). In 2001, Yuelu Fishery Farm (Chinese: 岳麓渔场) was merged into the subdistrict. In February 2002, its office was moved from Xinmin Road to the office building of Yuelu Fishery Farm. In 2008, its office was moved to the Fubuhe Road (Chinese: 阜埠河路), and the new office building has a construction area of 6,000 square metres (65,000 sq ft).

== Subdivisions ==
The subdistrict of Juzizhou has eight communities and two villages under its administration.

8 communities (社区)

- Baziqiang Community (八字墙社区)
- Houhu Community (湖大社区)
- Shida Community (师大社区)
- Shimenlou Community (石门楼社区)
- Tianfeng Community (天凤社区)
- Xinminlu Community (新民路社区)
- Xuetangpo Community (学堂坡社区)
- Yuenancun Community (岳南村社区)

2 villages (村)

- Houhu Xincun Village (后湖新村)
- Tianma Village (天马村)
