= Wangyue Subdistrict =

Wangyue 望岳街道
- Subdistrict
- Location within Hunan
- Coordinates: 28°13′51″N 112°55′21″E
- Country: People's Republic of China
- Province: Hunan
- City: Changsha
- District: Yuelu District
- Administrative centre: Qiliying Community (七里营社区)
- Divisions: 4 communities and 3 villages

Area
  - Total: 13.6 km^{2} (5.3 sq mi)

Population (2010 census)
  - Total: 27,812
  - Density: 2,040/km^{2} (5,300/sq mi)
- Time zone: UTC+8 (China Standard)
- Area code: 0731
- Languages: Standard Chinese and Changsha dialect
- Website: http://www.yuelu.gov.cn/wyjd/index.html

Wangyue Subdistrict (Chinese: 望岳街道; pinyin: Wàngyuè Jiēdào) is an urban subdistrict and the seat of Yuelu District in Changsha, Hunan Province, China. The subdistrict is located in the north eastern part of the district; it is bordered to the north by Yueliangdao Subdistrict of Wangcheng District, to the east by Guanshaling Subdistrict, to the south by Meixihu, Lugu and Yinpenling Subdistricts, and to the west by Wangchengpo Subdistrict. Wangyue covers 13.6 km^{2} (5.3 sq mi) with a population of 27,812 (as of 2010 census). It is divided into four communities and four communities under its jurisdiction, with its administrative centre at Qiliying Community (七里营社区).

== History ==
The subdistrict of Wangyue is historically Wangyue Township (望岳乡). The township of Wangyue was a township of Changsha County in 1950, it was a township of Wangcheng County (望城县) formed in 1951. The county of Wancgeng was merged to Changsha County in 1957, it was a part of Changsha County. The township of Wangyue was reorganized as a commune 1958 and was transferred to the Suburb District (郊区) in 1962, it was once again changed to Bairuo district (白箬区) of Changsha County in 1962 and to the Suburb District in 1978, It was reorganized to a township in 1984. The Suburb District was dissolved in 1996 and it became a part of Yuelu District formed in the same year. The township of Wangyue was reorganized to a subdistrict in 2001.

== Subdivision ==
The subdistrict of Wangyue has four communities and three villages under its jurisdiction.

4 communities

- Fuhoulu Community (府后路社区)
- Henghua Community (恒华社区)
- Bafang Community (八方小区社区)
- Qiliying Community (七里营社区)

3 villages

- Gufeng Village (谷峰村)
- Gushan Village (谷山村)
- Outang Village (藕塘村)
