= Pingtang Subdistrict =

Pingtang Subdistrict (Chinese: 坪塘街道; pinyin: Píngtáng Jiēdào) is a subdistrict of Yuelu District in Changsha, Hunan, China. It is historically the territory of former Baiquan Township Taiping Township (太平乡) and parts of the former Pingtang Town in Wangcheng County in 1994. The subdistrict has an area of 90.13 square kilometres (34.80 sq mi) with a registered population of 46,000 (as of 2012). The subdistrict has seven villages and two communities under its jurisdiction. its seat is Shifengshan Village

== History ==
In 589 AD, Linxiang County was renamed to Changsha County, today's Pingtang Subdistrict was part of Changsha County. From the year 1098 AD, Shanhua County (善化县) was established from Changsha County, by 1912, Shanhua was incorporated into Changsha County, it belonged to Shanhua County. Pingtang was the former Fulong Town (伏龙镇) of Changsha County in 1912 and it was part of the 10th District of Changsha County in 1930.

As the Revocation of Districts and Amalgamation of Townships (撤区并乡) in June 1956, the former Pingguan District (坪观区) was divided into four townships. As the Revocation of Townships and Establishment of Communes (撤乡建社) in October 1958, the Pingtang People's Commune (坪塘人民公社) was formed. County controlled districts were reorganized in July 1961 and the Pingtang District (坪塘区) of Changsha County was established, meanwhile the size of the communes was reduced. In December 1962, Lianhua District (莲花区) was created from a part of Pingtang District, Pingtang District had five communes of Pingtang (坪塘乡), Baiquan (白泉乡), Taiping (太平乡), Jiujiang (九江乡) and Xueshi (学士乡), and Pingtang Town (坪塘镇) under its administration.

In March 1984, the communes were reorganized to townships, Pingtang District governed five townships and a town. In 1985, the township of Pingtang was merged to the town of Pingtang.

As the Revocation of Districts and Amalgamation of Townships (撤区并乡) in June 1995, the two townships of Baiquan and Taiping were amalgamated to the town of Pingtang, the township of Xueshi (学士乡) was merged into Jiujiang Township, the newly established town of Pingtang had 35villages and three communities, the township of Jiujiang had 23 villages.

As the Amalgamation of Village-level Divisions (村级合并) of Wangcheng County in 2004, the division of Pingtang Town was reduced to 20 (5 communities and 15 villages) from 38 (3 communities and 35 villages).

On June 15, 2008, the town of Pingtang was transferred from Wangcheng County to Yuelu District. On August 3, 2012, the town of Pingtang was officially reorganized to a subdistrict. On January 18, 2013, the former Pingtang Subdistrict was converted to the two subdistricts of Pingtang and Yanghu. The newly established Pingtang Subdistrict had two communities and 11 villages with an area of 90.13 square kilometers. As a new round of the Amalgamation of Village-level Divisions (村级合并) in 2016, its divisions were reduced to nine from 13, it has two communities and seven villages under its jurisdiction, its seat is Shifengshan Village.

== Subdivisions ==
2 communities

- Guanyingang Community (观音港社区)
- Tongxigang Community (桐溪港社区)

7 villages

- Baiquan Village (白泉村)
- Hongqiao Village (红桥村)
- Lianshan Village (莲花山村)
- Shifengshan Village (狮峰山村)
- Shuanghu Village (双湖村)
- Taiping Village (太平村)
- Xinghe Village (兴和村)

== Tourist attractions ==
Tongxi Temple is a Buddhist temple in the subdistrict.
