= Changsha High-Tech Industrial Development Zone =

Changsha High-Tech Industrial Development Zone 长沙高新技术产业开发区
- High-Tech Industrial Zone
- Location in Hunan
- Coordinates: 28°13′21″N 112°53′58″E
- Country: People's Republic of China
- Province: Hunan
- Prefecture-level city: Changsha
- District: Yuelu District

Area
  - Total: 140 km^{2} (54 sq mi)
- Time zone: UTC+08:00 (China Standard)
- Postal code: 410000
- Area code: 0731
- Website: en.changsha.gov.cn

Chinese name
- Traditional Chinese: 長沙高新技術產業開發區
- Simplified Chinese: 长沙高新技术产业开发区
Transcriptions
Standard Mandarin
- Hanyu Pinyin: Chángshā Gāoxīn Jìshù Chǎnyè Kāifāqū

Changsha High-Tech Industrial Development Zone (Chinese: 长沙高新技术产业开发区; abbr: CSHTZ) is a national high-tech industrial zone in Changsha City, Hunan Province, China. It is the original Changsha Technology Development Experimental Zone (长沙科技开发试验区) founded in July, 1988. It was renamed to the present name, meanwhile the zone was upgraded to one of first batch of national HTZs. In March 1991, and became a national innovative technology pilot zone approved by the Ministry of Science & Technology in 2009. Its core area is situated in the west of Changsha on the west shore of the Xiang River, and the north side of Yuelu Mountain Scenic Area.

In 2016, the total planned area of CSHTZ is 140 km^{2} (54 sq mi). The CSHTZ consists of Yuelu Mountain Hi-Tech Park (岳麓山高科技园), Xingsha Industrial Hi-Tech Park (星沙工业高科技园), Longping High-Tech Park (隆平高科技园), Broad Hi-Tech Park (远大高科技园) and City Proper Policy District (市内政策区), of which the Yuelu Mountain Hi-Tech Park is its core industrial park directly managed by CSHTZ. Yuelu Mountain Hi-Tech Park is also called "Luvalley". The controlled overall plan area of Luvalley is 80 km^{2} (31 sq mi) and up to now 15 km^{2} (5.8 sq mi) are of development scale.

The pillar industries in CSHTZ are service outsourcing, environmental protection, new materials, new energy, biomedicine, electronic information and advanced manufacturing. As of 2015, the total business income of enterprises in the zone reaches 425.1 billion yuan (US$68.25 billion), the gross output value of industry is 379.2 billion yuan (US$60.88 billion). of which the total business income in Luvalley is 250 billion yuan (US$40.14 billion), its added value of scale-sized industries is 36.78 billion yuan (US$5.91 billion).
