= Yuelu, Changsha =

Yuelu 岳麓区
- District
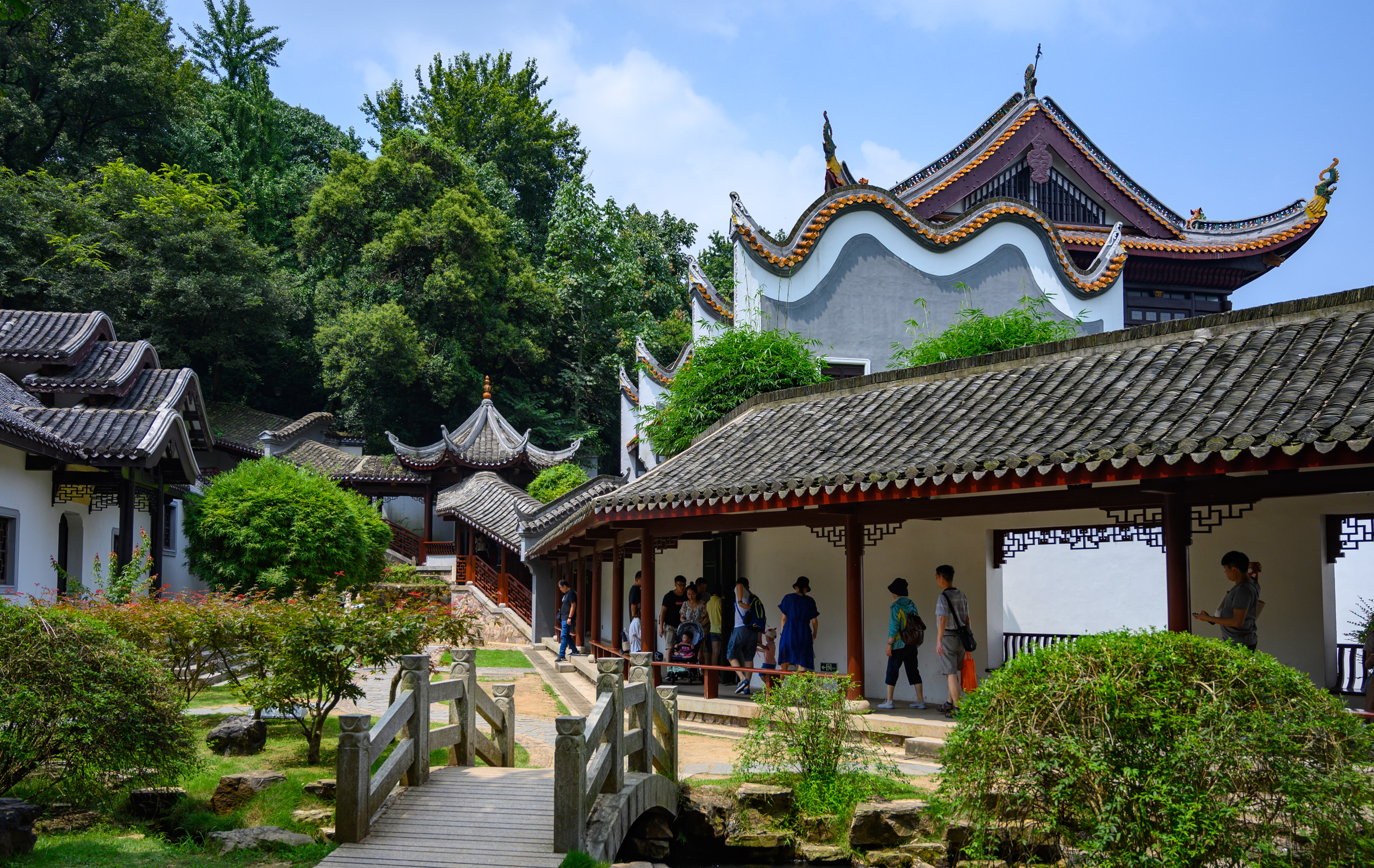
- Yuelu Academy

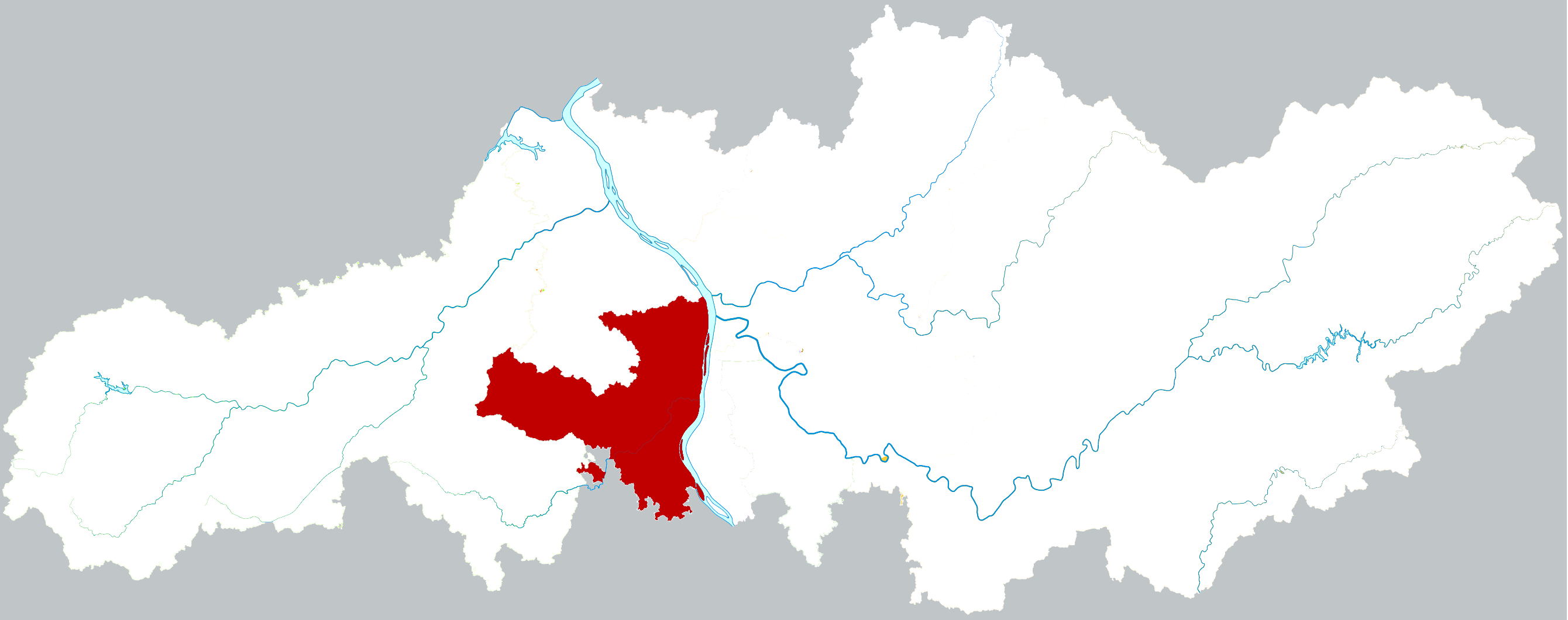
- Map of Yuelu in Changsha

- Location in Hunan
- Coordinates: 28°14′07″N 112°55′53″E
- Country: China
- Province: Hunan
- Prefecture-level city: Changsha
- District seat: Wangyue Subdistrict

Area
  - Total: 552.02 km^{2} (213.14 sq mi)

Population (2020 census)
  - Total: 1,526,641
  - Density: 2,765.6/km^{2} (7,162.8/sq mi)
- Time zone: UTC+8 (China Standard)
- Website: www.yuelu.gov.cn

Yuelu District (simplified Chinese: 岳麓区; traditional Chinese: 嶽麓區; pinyin: Yuèlù qū) is one of six urban districts and the municipal seat of the prefecture-level city of Changsha, the capital of Hunan Province, China. It is the 4th most populous district (after Heshan, Dingcheng and Yueyanglou Districts) in Hunan. The district is bordered to the north by Wangcheng District, to the west by Ningxiang County, to the south by Yuhu District of Xiangtan City, across the Xiang river to the west by Tianxin, Furong and Kaifu Districts. Located on the west bank of the Xiang River, as the western part of the City proper, the district is named after Mount Yuelu, one of the national parks, Yuelu District covers 538.83 km^{2} (208.04 sq mi) with registered population of 644,834 and resident population of 818,900 (as of 2014). The district has 16 subdistricts and 2 towns under its jurisdiction, with its administrative centre at Wangyue (望岳街道).

== History ==
Yuelu District is one of five districts established on 22 April 1996 as a result of adjusting the administrative districts of Changsha. It covers most of the historic West District, including South Lushan Road (麓山南路), Yinpenling (银盆岭), Juzizhou (桔子洲) and Wangyuehu (望月村) four subdistricts, Yuelushan Township (岳麓山乡) and Wangyue Township (望岳乡) of the historic Jiaoqu, Tianding Township (天顶乡) of the historic Wangcheng County.

== High education ==
Yuelu is an important cultural district with a long history and profound cultural deposit in Changsha. The Yuelu Academy (later become Hunan University) founded in 976 (the 9th year of the reign of the Song dynasty) is on the east side of Yuelu Mountain; in the south is the University Town Zone where there are many universities including:

- Central South University,
- Changsha Medical University,
- Hunan University,
- Hunan Normal University,
- Hunan First Normal University,
- Hunan University of Finance and Economics,
- Hunan International Economics University,
- Hunan University of Technology and Business,
- Hunan University of Chinese Medicine,
- The Changsha High-Tech Industrial Development Zone covers large area in the middle of the district.

== Administrative divisions ==
Yuelu has 17 subdistricts and 2 towns under its jurisdictions.

17 subdistricts

- Wangyuehu Subdistrict (望月湖街道)
- Yuelu Subdistrict (岳麓街道)
- Juzizhou Subdistrict (桔子洲街道)
- Yinpenling Subdistrict (银盆岭街道)
- Guanshaling Subdistrict (观沙岭街道)
- Wangchengpo Subdistrict (望城坡街道)
- Xihu Subdistrict (西湖街道)
- Xianjiahu Subdistrict (咸嘉湖街道)
- Wangyue Subdistrict (望岳街道)
- Meixihu Subdistrict (梅溪湖街道)
- Lugu Subdistrict (麓谷街道)
- Pingtang Subdistrict (坪塘街道)
- Hanpu Subdistrict (含浦街道)
- Tianding Subdistrict (天顶街道)
- Yanghu Subdistrict (洋湖街道)
- Xueshi Subdistrict (学士街道)
- Dongfanghong Subdistrict (东方红街道)

2 towns

- Lianhua (莲花镇)
- Yuchangping (雨敞坪镇)

== Economy ==
According to preliminary accounting of the statistical authority, the gross domestic product of Yuelu District in 2017 was 101,671 million yuan (15,058 million US dollars), up by 9.2 percent over the previous year. Of this total, the value added of the primary industry was 1,862 million yuan (276 million US dollars), up by 6.6 percent, that of the secondary industry was 42,831 million yuan (6,344 million US dollars), up by 9.2 percent and that of the tertiary industry was 56,978 million yuan (8,439 million US dollars), up by 9.8 percent. The value added of the primary industry accounted for 1.83 percent of the GDP; that of the secondary industry accounted for 42.13 percent; and that of the tertiary industry accounted for 56.04 percent. The per capita GDP by the population of mid-year permanent residents in 2017 was 120,499 yuan (17,847 US dollars).
