= Changsha dialect =

Dialect of Xiang Chinese

- 长沙话
- Pronunciation: [tsã˩˧sɔ˧ɣo˨˩]
- Native to: China
- Region: Changsha, Hunan province
- Language family: Sino-Tibetan: Sinitic; Chinese; Xiang; New Xiang (Chang-Yi); Changsha dialect

Language codes
- ISO 639-3: –
- Glottolog: chan1326

The Changsha dialect (simplified Chinese: 长沙话; traditional Chinese: 長沙話; pinyin: Chángshāhuà; IPA: [tsã˩˧sɔ˧ɣo˨˩]) is a dialect of New Xiang Chinese. It is spoken predominantly in Changsha, the capital of Hunan province, China. It is not mutually intelligible with Standard Mandarin, the official language of China.

== Classification ==
The Changsha dialect is what Chinese dialectologists would call a New Xiang variety, as opposed to Old Xiang; the distinction is mainly based on the presence of the Middle Chinese voiced plosives and affricates. The Old Xiang varieties, being more conservative, have in general kept them while the New Xiang ones have altogether lost them and changed them to voiceless unaspirated consonants. Although most Chinese dialectologists treat New Xiang as part of the group, Zhou Zhenhe and You Rujie classify it as Southwestern Mandarin.

== Geographic distribution ==
The Changsha dialect is spoken in the city of Changsha and its neighbouring suburbs. However, there are some slight differences between the urban and suburban speech. For instance, the retroflex set is only heard in the suburbs, but not in the city. Further, some words have a different final in the two varieties.

=== Dialects ===
There are no substantial differences between dialects in the neighbourhoods of Changsha; however, age dialects do exist. For example, the distinction between alveolar and alveolo-palatal consonants is only made by the elderly while the younger generations do not normally distinguish them. The finals [-oŋ] and [-ioŋ] have become [-ən] and [-in] in the younger speech. Also, the initial consonant [ɲ] in the elderly's and middled-aged's speech is either dropped altogether or changed to [l].

== Phonetics and phonology ==
The Changsha dialect, together with other New Xiang varieties, has lost the Middle Chinese obstruents, which are changed to voiceless unaspirated consonants. It has also lost all the final plosives found in the rù tone in Middle Chinese.

=== Consonants ===
Consonants of the Changsha dialect
		Labial	Alveolar	Alveolo- palatal	Retroflex	Velar
Nasal		m	n	ɲ		ŋ
Plosive	voiceless unaspirated	p	t			k
Plosive	voiceless aspirated	pʰ	tʰ			kʰ
Affricate	voiceless unaspirated		ts	tɕ	tʂ	
Affricate	aspirated		tsʰ	tɕʰ	tʂʰ	
Fricative	voiceless	f	s	ɕ	ʂ	x
Fricative	voiced		z		ʐ	
Lateral approximant			l			

=== Vowels ===
Vowels/Combinations of the Changsha dialect
	-∅						-i			-u			-a	-n			Nasal
∅-		o		ɤ		ɪ											õ
i-	ei	io	iɛ			i				iəu	iau		ia	ian		in	iɛ̃
u-				uɤ	uɑ	u	uai	uei						uan	uən		
y-			yɛ			y	yai	yei					ya	yan		yn	yɛ̃
ə-												əu				ən	
a-						a			ai		au					an	
C-																	ɤ̃

=== Tones ===
Changsha has 6 tones, which are neutralized in syllables ending in a stop.

Tone chart of the Changsha dialect
Tone number	Tone name	Tone contour	Description
1	yin ping (陰平)	˧ (3) or ā	mid
2	yang ping (陽平)	˩˧ (13) or ǎ	rising
3	shang sheng (上聲)	˦˩ (41) or â	falling
4	yin qu (陰去)	˥ (5) or á	high
5	yang qu (陽去)	˨˩ (21) or à	low
6	ru sheng (入聲)	˨˦ʔ (24′) or aʔ	checked

== See also ==
- List of Chinese dialects
