= Zifeng =

Zifeng may refer to:

== Places in Mainland China ==
- Zifeng Park (Chinese: 紫凤公园), park in Kaifu District, Changsha, Hunan
- Zifeng Tower, supertall skyscraper in Gulou District, Nanjing, Jiangsu

== People ==
- Ling Zifeng (Chinese: 凌子风), Chinese film writer and director
- Wang Zifeng (born 1997), Chinese rower
- Zhang Zifeng (Chinese: 张子枫), Chinese actress
- Zhu Zifeng (born 2002), Chinese diver

== Fiction ==
- Cai Zifeng (Chinese: 蔡子峰), fictional swordsman in the 1967 wuxia novel The Smiling, Proud Warrior
