= Yaquehu station =

Metro station in Changsha, China

Yaquehu station 雅雀湖站
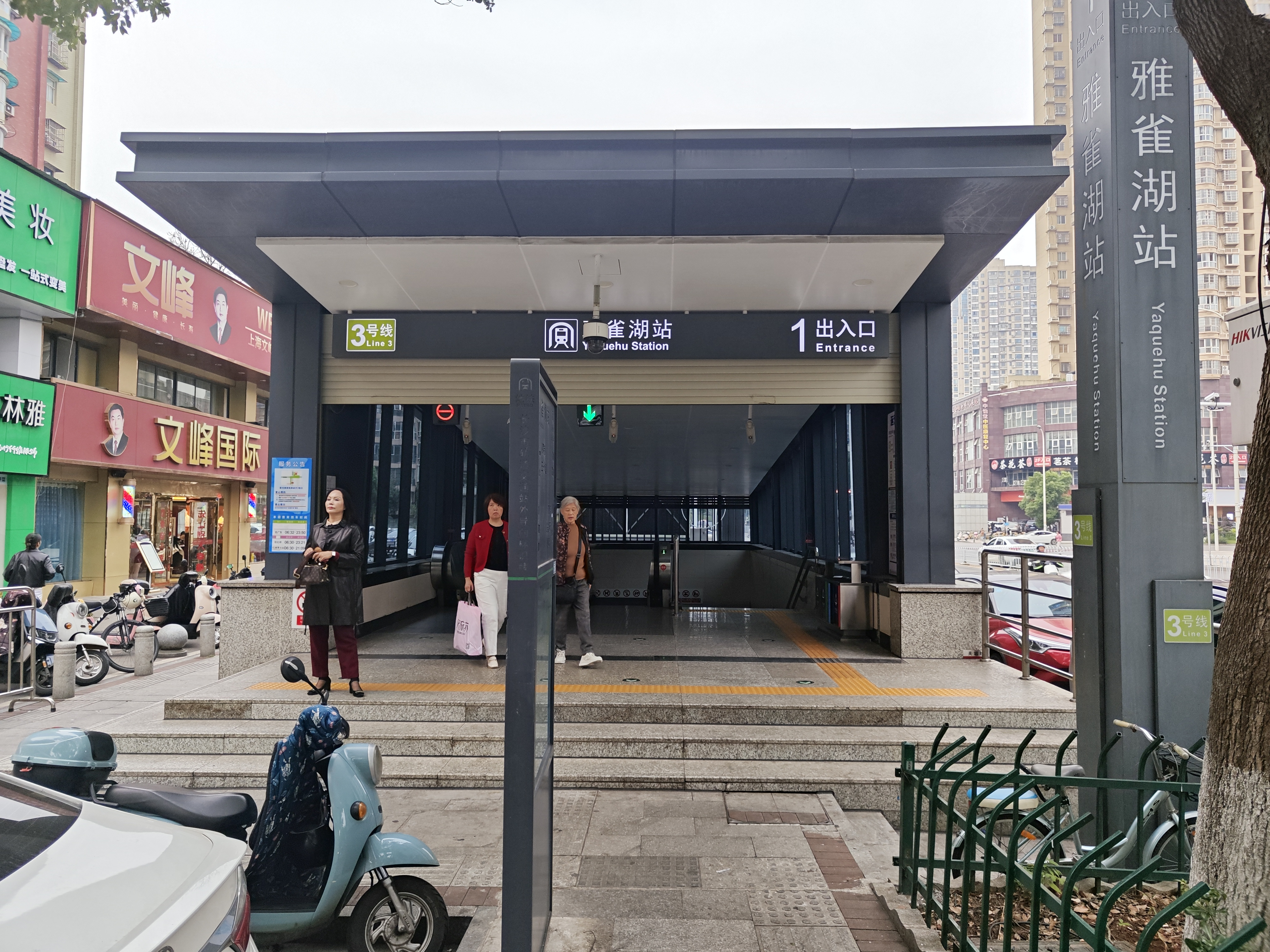
- Entrance 1

General information
- Location: Kaifu District, Changsha, Hunan; China
- Coordinates: 28°14′36″N 113°01′13″E
- Operated by: Changsha Metro
- Line(s): Line 3
- Platforms: 2 (1 island platform)

History
- Opened: 28 June 2020

Services
Preceding station	Changsha Metro	Following station
Sifangping towards Shantang	Line 3	Changsha University towards Guangsheng

Yaquehu station (Chinese: 雅雀湖站; pinyin: Yǎquèhú Zhàn) is a subway station in Kaifu District, Changsha, Hunan, China, operated by the Changsha subway operator Changsha Metro. It entered revenue service on 28 June 2020.

== History ==
The station started the test operation on 30 December 2019. The station opened on 28 June 2020.

== Surrounding area ==
- Secondary School affiliated to National Defense University of Science and Technology
- Yaquehu Neighbourhood
