= Furongbeilu Subdistrict =

Furongbeilu Subdistrict 芙蓉北路街道
- Subdistrict
- Location in Hunan
- Coordinates: 28°15′14″N 112°59′35″E
- Country: People's Republic of China
- Province: Hunan
- Prefecture-level city: Changsha
- District: Kaifu

Area
  - Total: 2.66 km^{2} (1.03 sq mi)

Population (2012)
  - Total: 45,000
  - Density: 17,000/km^{2} (44,000/sq mi)
- Time zone: UTC+8 (China Standard)

Furongbeilu Subdistrict (Chinese: 芙蓉北路街道; pinyin: Fúróngběilù jiēdào) is an urban subdistrict and the seat of Kaifu District, Changsha City, Hunan Province, China. The subdistrict is located in the west central part of the district and on the eastern bank of the Xiang River. It is bordered to the north by Laodaohe Subdistrict to the east by Liuyanghe Subdistrict, to the south by Xinhe and Wujialing Subdistricts. Furongbeilu covers 3.45 km^{2} (1.33 sq mi) with a population of about 50,000. It is divided into six communities under its jurisdiction.
