= Zifeng Park =

Park in Changsha, China

- 紫凤公园
- Location within Hunan
- Type: Public park, urban park
- Location: Kaifu District of Changsha, Hunan, China
- Coordinates: 28°14′N 112°59′E
- Area: 33,400-square-metre (360,000 sq ft)
- Created: 1993
- Status: Open all year

Chinese name
- Simplified Chinese: 紫凤公园
- Traditional Chinese: 紫鳳公園
Transcriptions
Standard Mandarin
- Hanyu Pinyin: Zǐfèng Gōngyuán

Zifeng Sports Park
- Simplified Chinese: 紫凤体育公园
- Traditional Chinese: 紫鳳體育公園
Transcriptions
Standard Mandarin
- Hanyu Pinyin: Zǐfèng Tǐyù Gōngyuán

Zifeng Park (Chinese: 紫凤公园) also known as Zifeng Sports Park, is a public park located in Kaifu District of Changsha, Hunan, China.

== Etymology ==
Zifeng Park is named based on the couplet "南接紫薇紫气到，北依凤嘴凤仪来; 南接紫薇紫氣到，北依風嘴鳳儀來)", which references its proximity to Kaifu Temple on Ziwei Mountain to the south and Fengzui Road to the north.

== History ==
Zifeng Park was established in December 1993 as a supporting green space project for the Yinpenling Bridge (also known as the North Bridge). Initially named "Bridgehead Park" (桥头公园; 橋頭公園; Qiáotóu Gōngyuán), its name was later changed to Zifeng Park after a public solicitation process.

In 2003, the Changsha Municipal People's Government decided to redevelop the park, transforming it into Hunan's first regional, open, specialized sports and leisure park. This renovation introduced dedicated sports facilities, including basketball courts, and adjusted the landscaping to better integrate sports with the park's natural environment.

== Geography ==
Zifeng Park is situated in northern Changsha, at the eastern end of the Yinpenling Bridge, which crosses the Xiang River. The park's unique geographical feature is that the main bridge structure passes directly over the park, visually dividing it into northern and southern sections. The total area of the park is approximately 33,400-square-metre (360,000 sq ft).

== Major attractions ==
- Sports Facilities: the park is best known for its public sports facilities, including a popular three-player-a-side lighted plastic basketball court, a table tennis hall, and other fitness areas.
- Zodiac Scenic Wall: a prominent 3-metre (9.8 ft) high, 14-metre (46 ft) long wall featuring hollowed-out carvings of the twelve Chinese zodiac animals, located near the East Gate.
- Viburnum macrocephalum f. keteleeri Blooms: the park is a famous spot in Changsha for viewing the beautiful Viburnum macrocephalum f. keteleeri blossoms every spring.

== Transportation ==
The nearest metro station is Kaifu Temple Station on Line 1.
