= Hongshan Temple =

Buddhist temple in Changsha, China

- 洪山寺
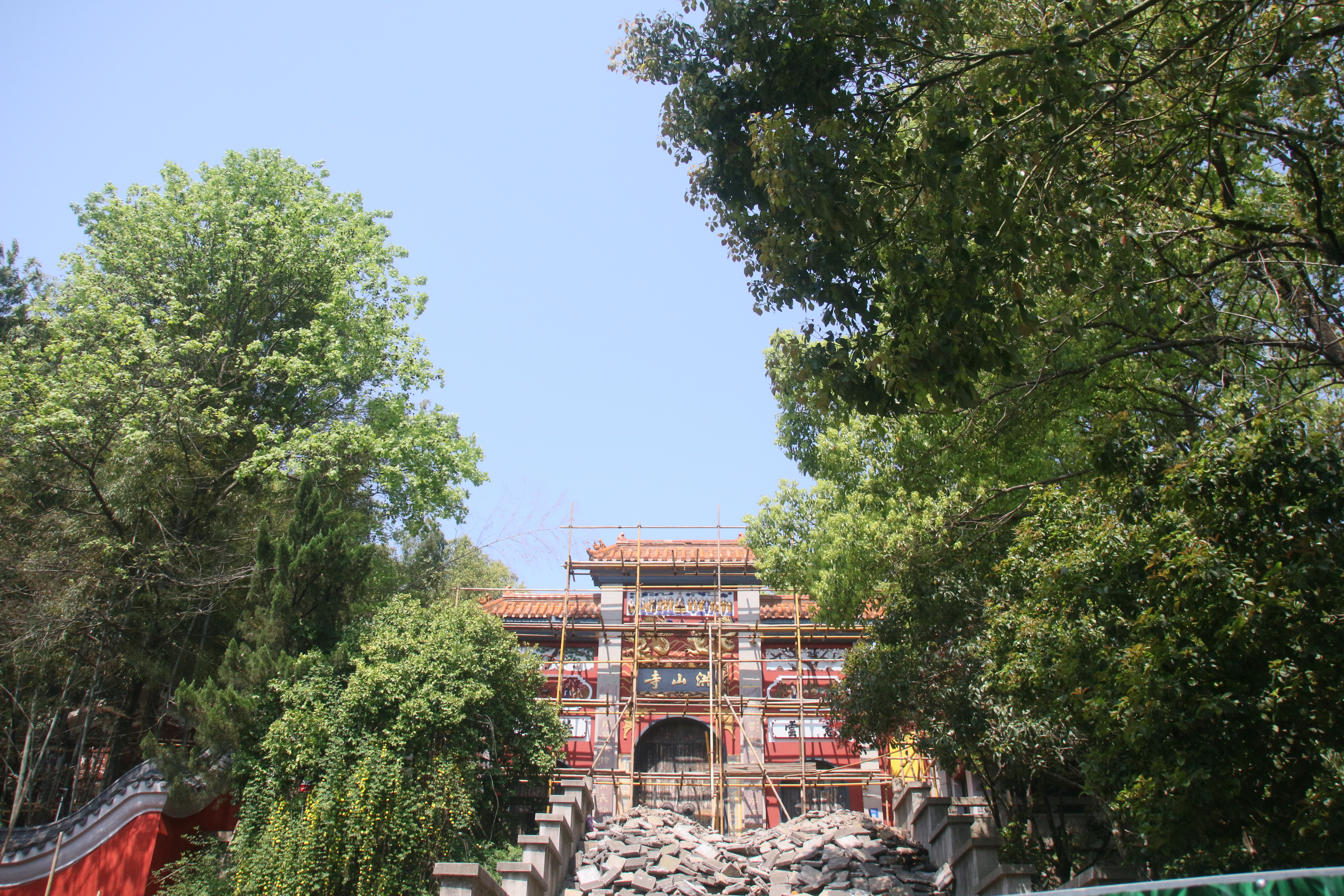
- Shanmen, Hongshan Temple

- Location within Hunan

Religion
- Affiliation: Buddhism
- Sect: Linji school
- Leadership: Shi Zenghui

Location
- Location: Hongshan Subdistrict, Kaifu District of Changsha, Hunan, China
- Interactive map of Hongshan Temple
- Coordinates: 28°15′56″N 113°02′12″E

Architecture
- Style: Chinese architecture
- Completed: August 1993 (reconstruction)

Hongshan Temple (Chinese: 洪山寺; pinyin: Hóngshān Sì) is a Buddhist temple located in Hongshan Subdistrict, Kaifu District of Changsha, Hunan, China.

== History ==
According to Volume 31 of Changsha County Annals, Hongshan Temple was established by a landlord surnamed Zhou during the Ming dynasty (1368–1644), and later the local people raised funds to rebuild and rename it "Lufeng Temple".

During the Qing dynasty (1644–1911), Hong Xiuquan led the Taiping army through Changsha and saw the "imperial seal" on the plaque in the front hall. Hong Xiuquan ordered his subordinates to demolish the front hall and mountain gate. His subordinates saw the inscription "Hong" on the plaque, and Hong Xiuquan ordered his subordinates to rebuild the temple. The rear hall of Hongshan Temple was donated and built by Rao Dongfang, the magistrate of Changsha.

After the establishment of the People's Republic of China in 1949, the government vigorously cracked down on superstition, and the statues and halls of Hongshan Temple were demolished, leaving only a few houses for students to use as classrooms. In 1964, the entire Hongshan Temple was completely destroyed. In 1992, the local people resolved to rebuild Hongshan Temple and obtained approval from the local government. In August 1993, the reconstruction of Hongshan Temple was completed.

== Architecture ==
Now the existing main buildings include Shanmen, Four Heavenly Kings Hall, Mahavira Hall, Kshitigarbha Hall, Foguang Pagoda, Buddhist Texts Library and side rooms.

== Gallery ==
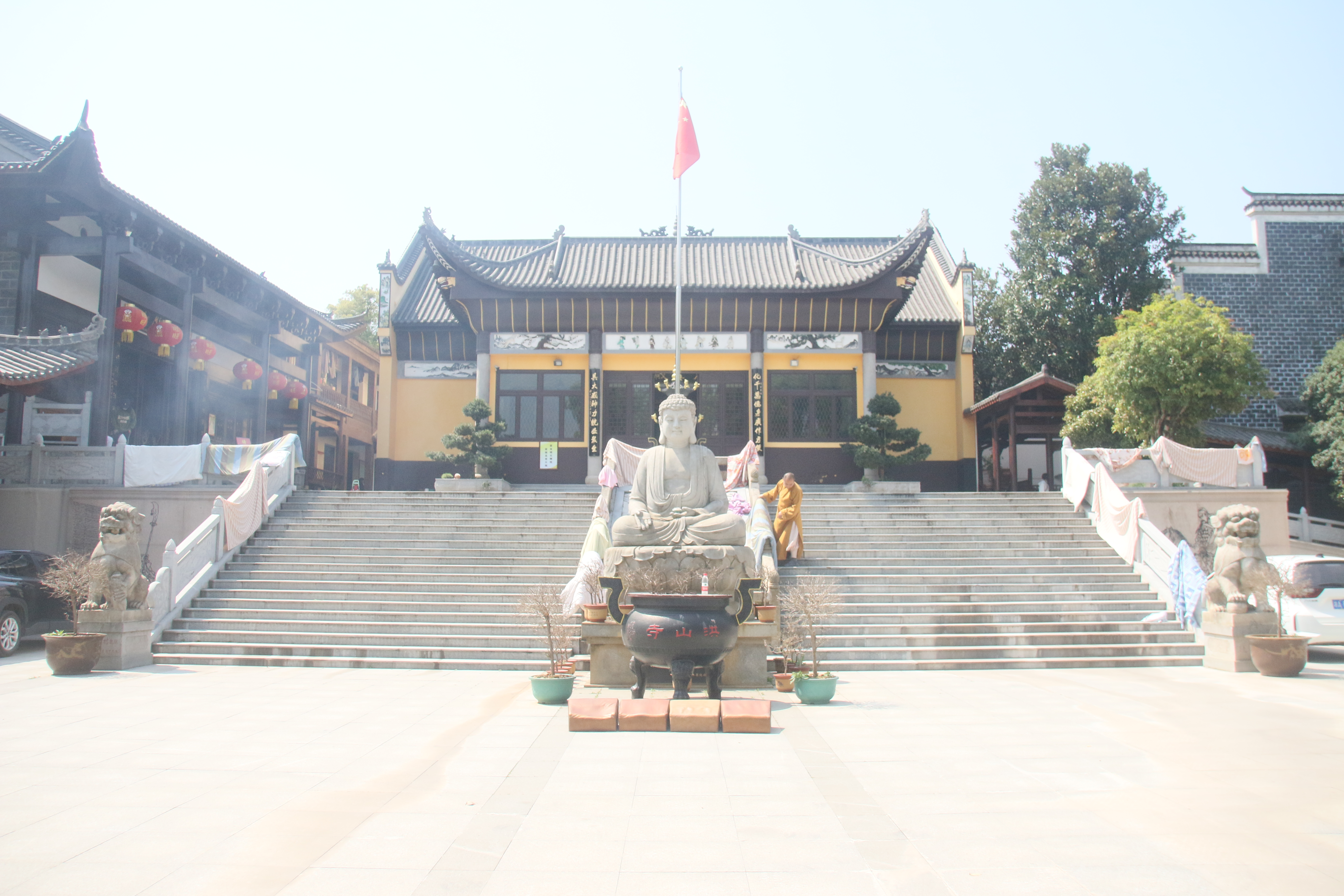
Four Heavenly Kings Hall

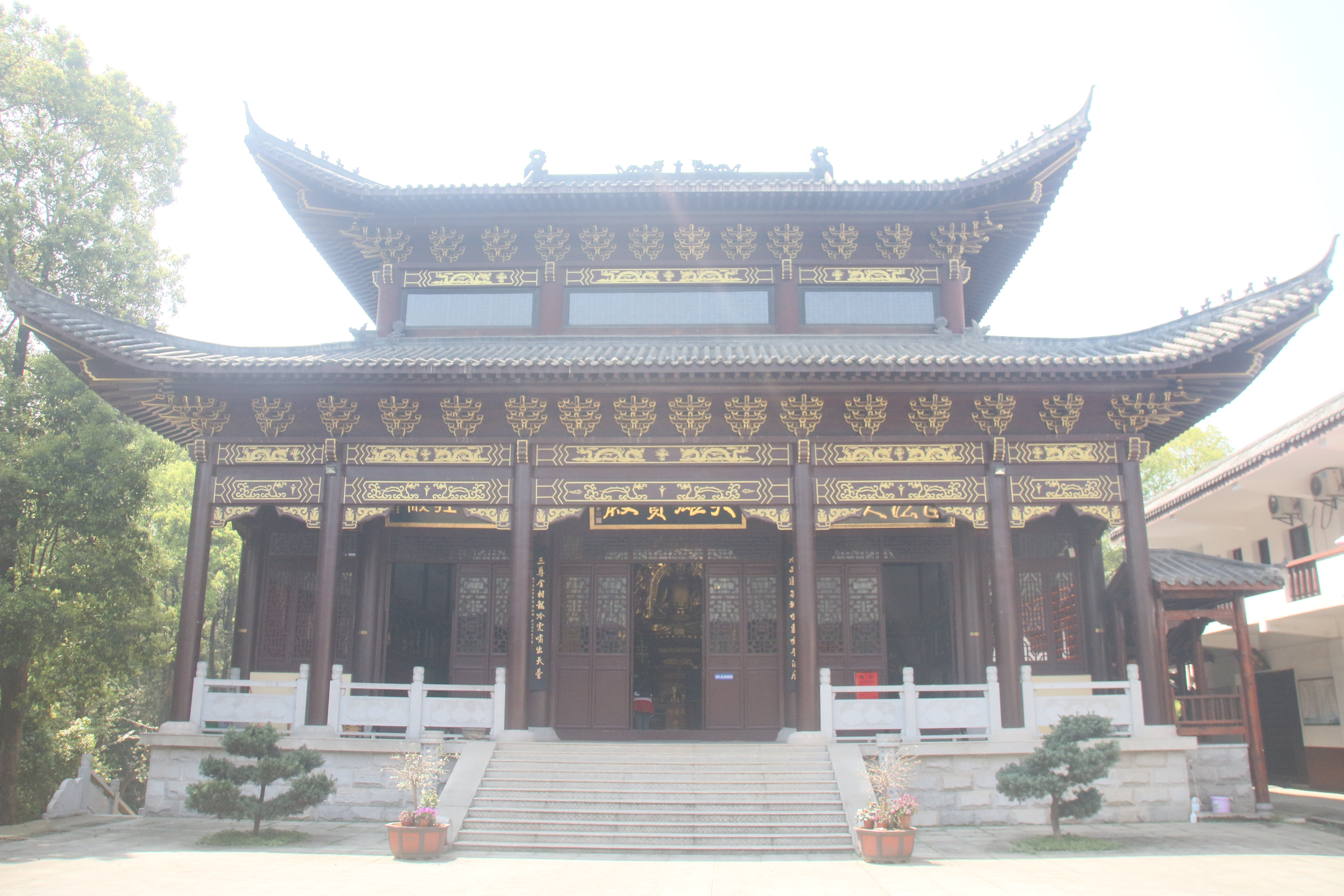
Mahavira Hall

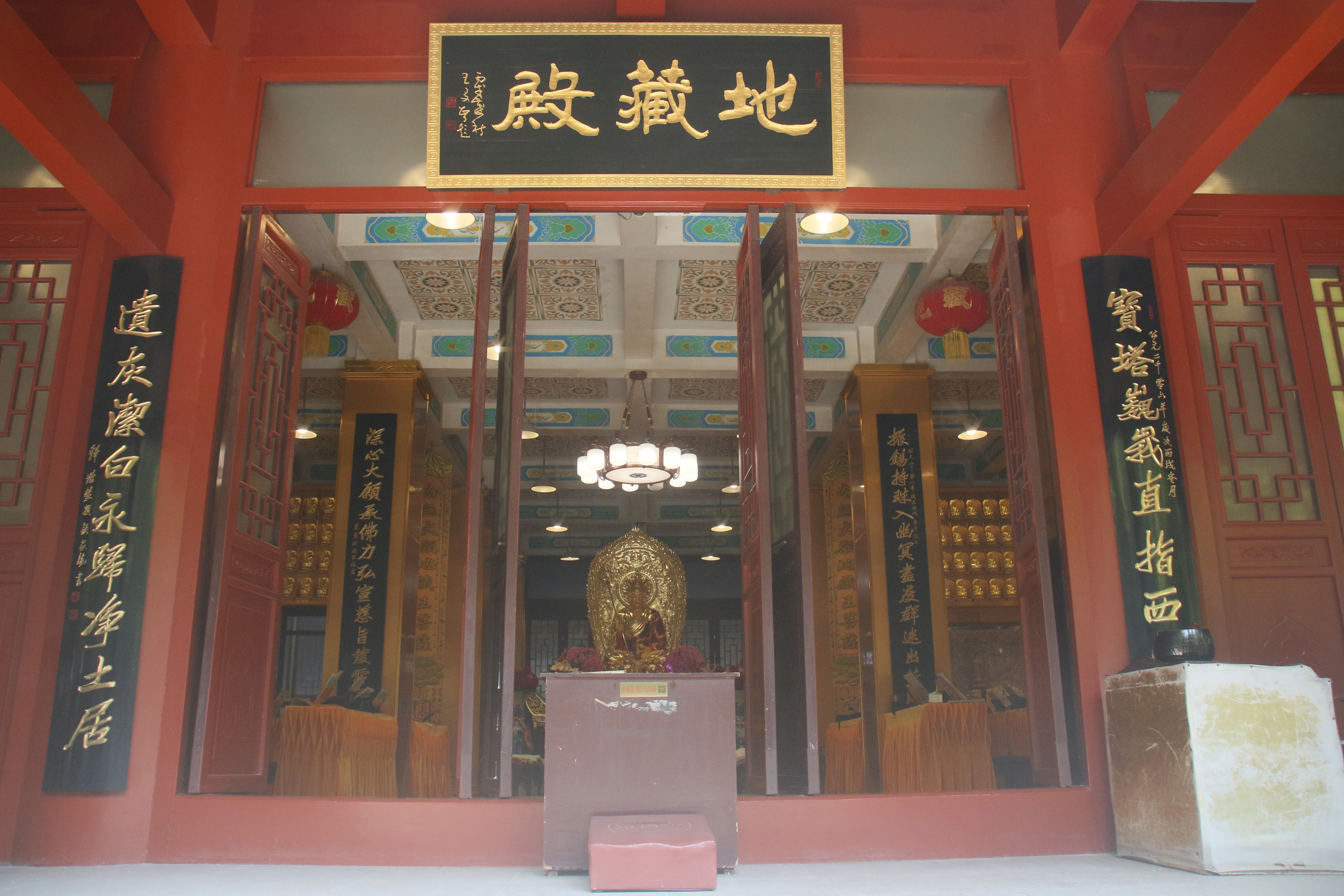
Kshitigarbha Hall

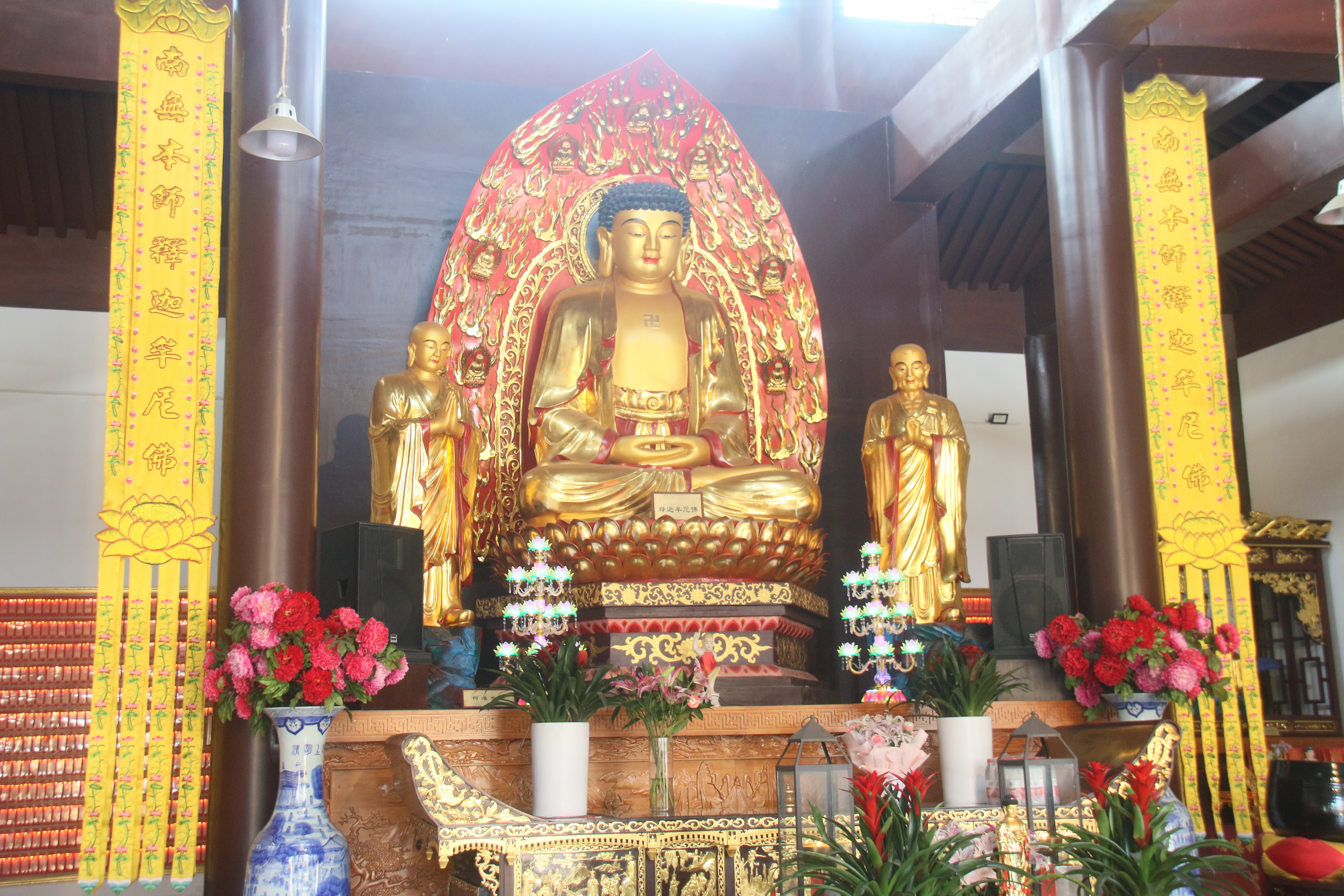
In the middle of the Mahavira Hall placed the statue of Sakyamuni, with statues of Ananda and Kassapa Buddha on the left and right

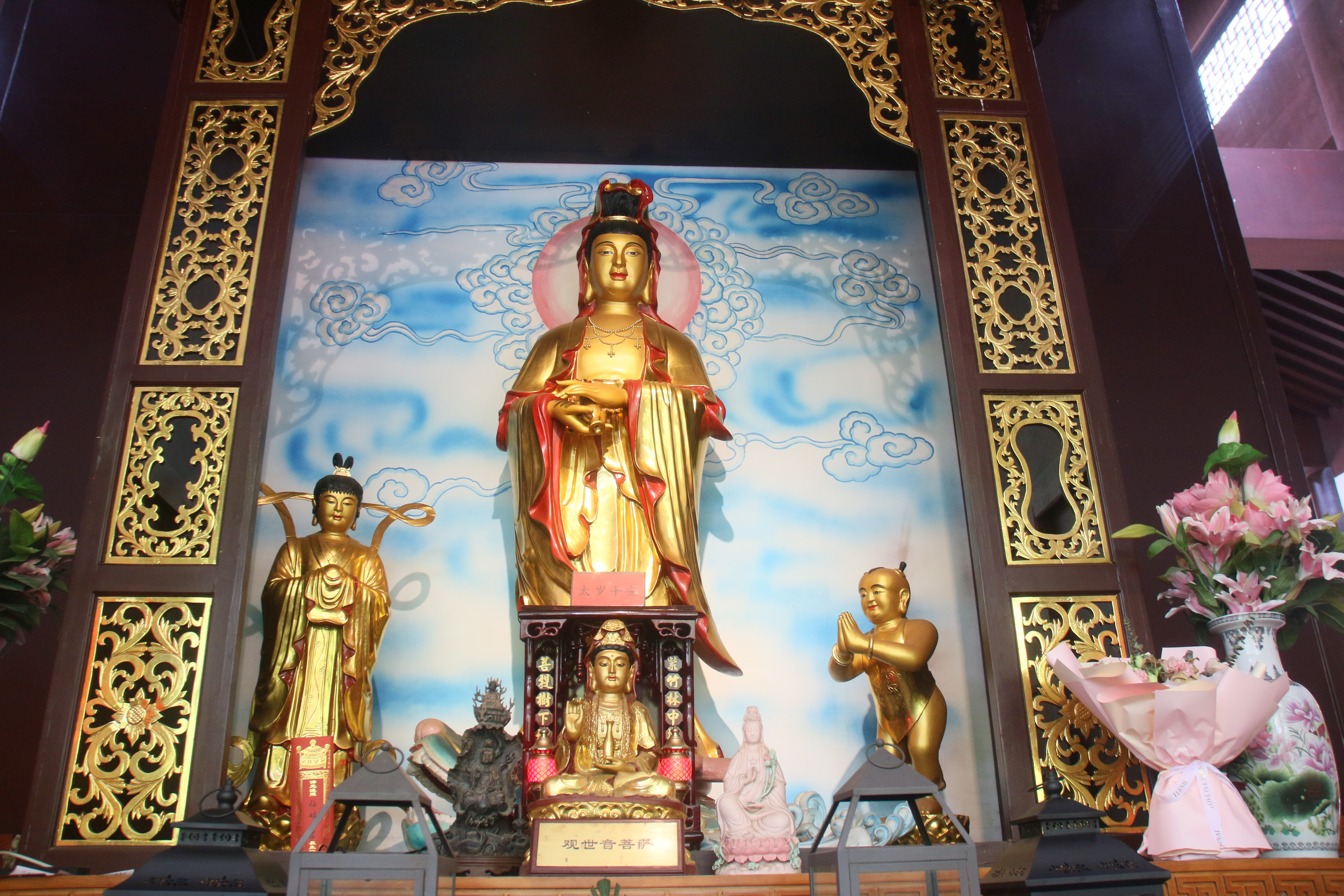
In the center of the Mahavira Hall (back) enshrines the statue of Guanyin with Shancai standing on the left and Longnü on the right

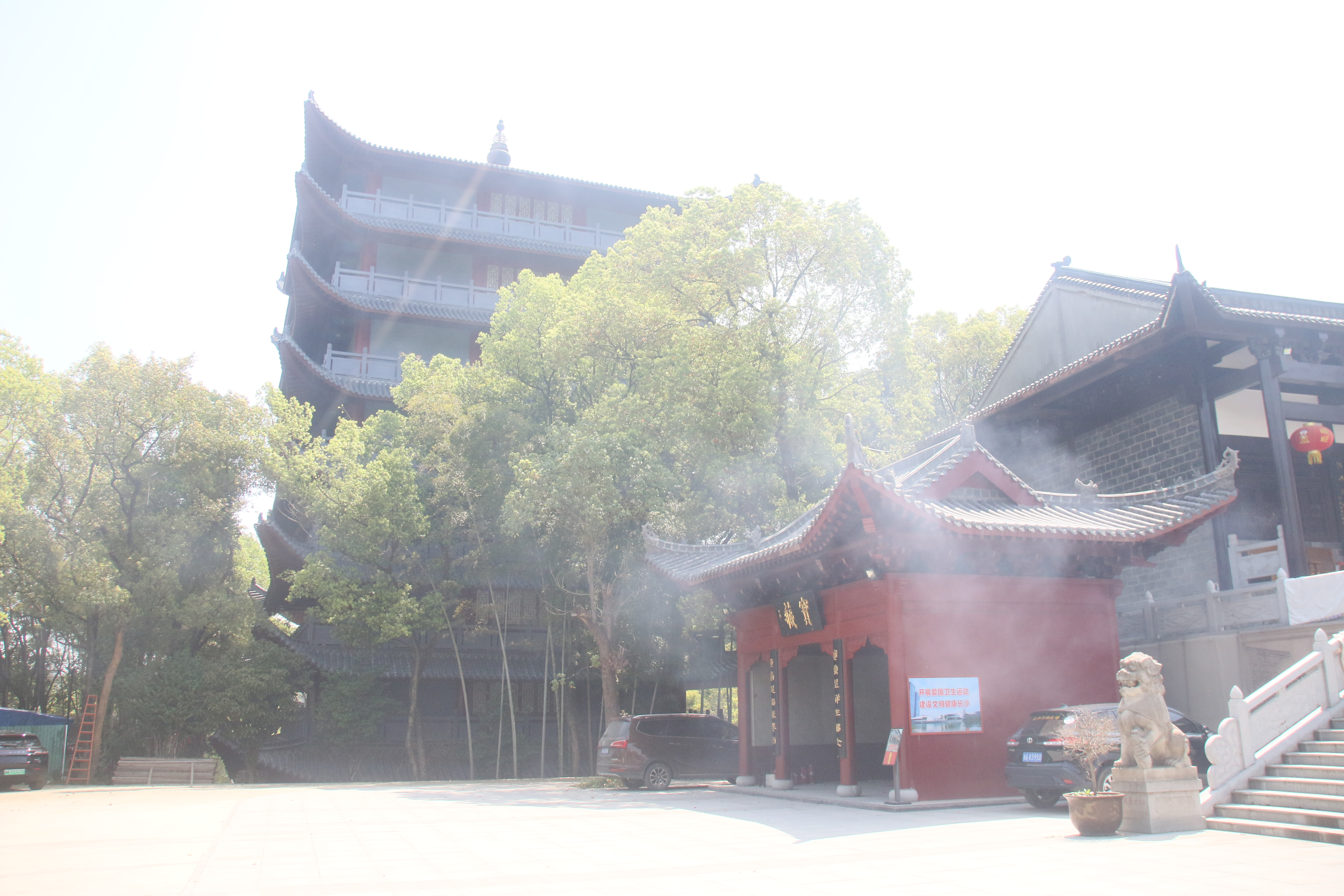
Foguang Pagoda
