= Tielu Temple =

Buddhist temple in Changsha, China

Iron Stove Temple
- 铁炉寺
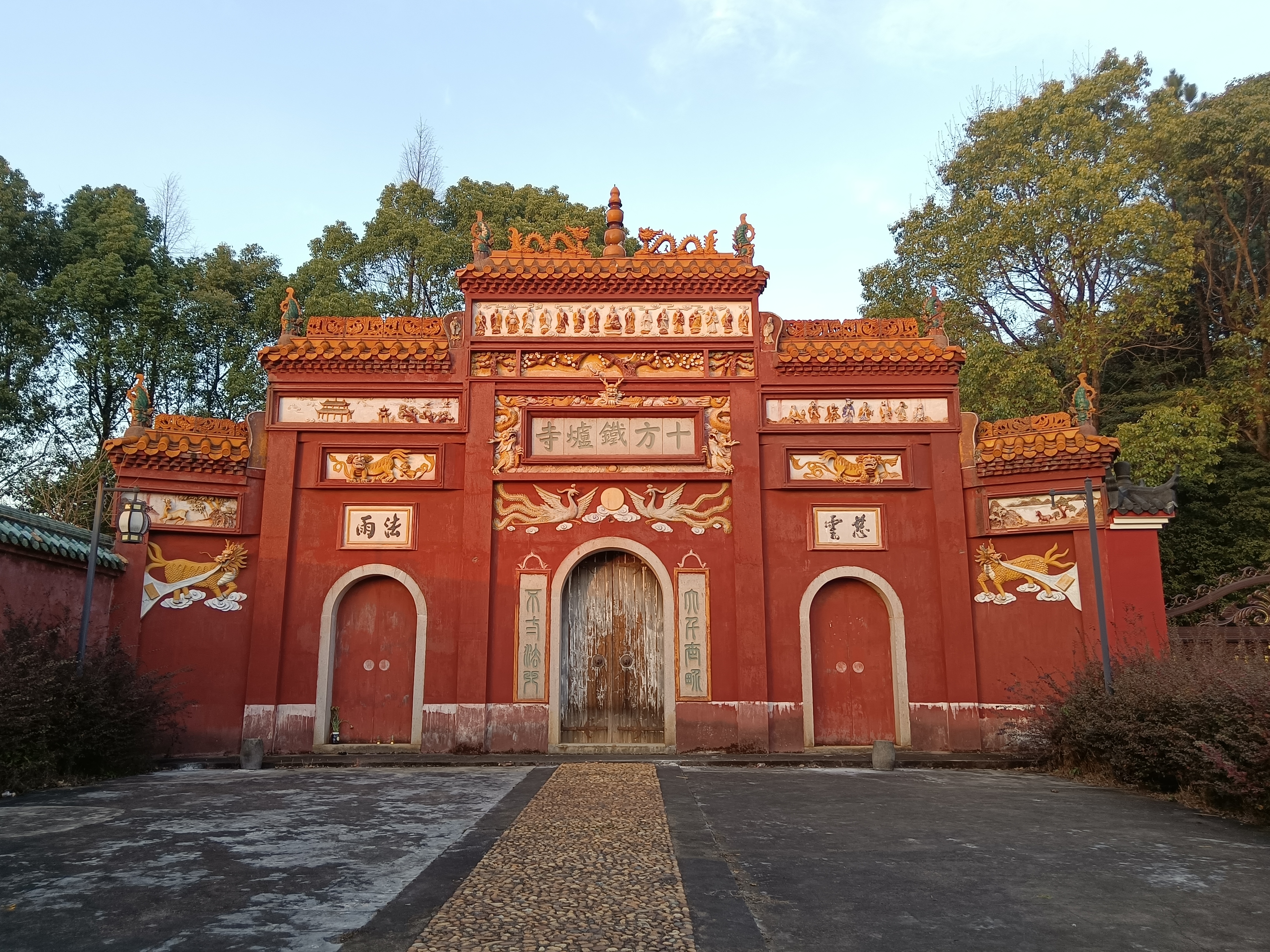
- Shanmen

- Location within Hunan

Religion
- Affiliation: Buddhism
- Sect: Linji school

Location
- Location: Laodaohe Subdistrict, Kaifu District, Changsha, Hunan, China
- Interactive map of Iron Stove Temple
- Coordinates: 28°19′07″N 113°02′17″E

Architecture
- Style: Chinese architecture
- Completed: 1995 (reconstruction)

Tielu Temple (simplified Chinese: 铁炉寺; traditional Chinese: 鐵爐寺; pinyin: Tiělú Sì; lit. 'Iron Stove Temple') is a Buddhist temple located in Laodaohe Subdistrict, Kaifu District of Changsha, Hunan, China.

== History ==
The date of construction of Iron Stove Temple is unknown. There were two ancient tea trees in the temple. It is said that the tea trees was planted by Yue Fei when he went to the Dongting Lake area during the Zhong Xiang and Yang Mo Uprising (钟相、杨么起义) from Jianyan era to Shaoxing era (1130–1335) in the Southern Song dynasty (1127–1279).

In 1931 during the Republic of China, the temple was changed to the Bhikkhunī Temple.

After the People's Republic of China was established in 1949, the Buddha statues of Iron Stove Temple was smashed, and the Bhikkhunī were successively driven back to their original places of origin to return to secular life, regular scripture lectures, meditation and other features of temple life were banned. In 1959, during the Great Leap Forward period, Iron Stove Temple was devastated three times, leaving only two miscellaneous houses for the Bhikkhunī to live. In 1974, the Changsha County People's Government decided to demolish the temple, which was blocked by the Bhikkhunī and believers. After the 3rd Plenary Session of the 11th Central Committee of the Chinese Communist Party, according to the national policy of free religious belief, the temple was officially reopened to the public in 1979. In 1982, under the auspices of Bhikkhunī Xiaochan (晓忏), more than ten rooms and houses were rebuilt with donations from believers and Buddhist service revenues. But a rainstorm destroyed the newly founded rooms and houses in the following year. Renovations and rebuilding to the main building began and were completed in 1995.

== Architecture ==
Now the existing main buildings include Paifang, Shanmen, Four Heavenly Kings Hall, Mahavira Hall, Kshitigarbha Hall, Liuli Hall (琉璃宝殿) and ring-rooms.

== Gallery ==
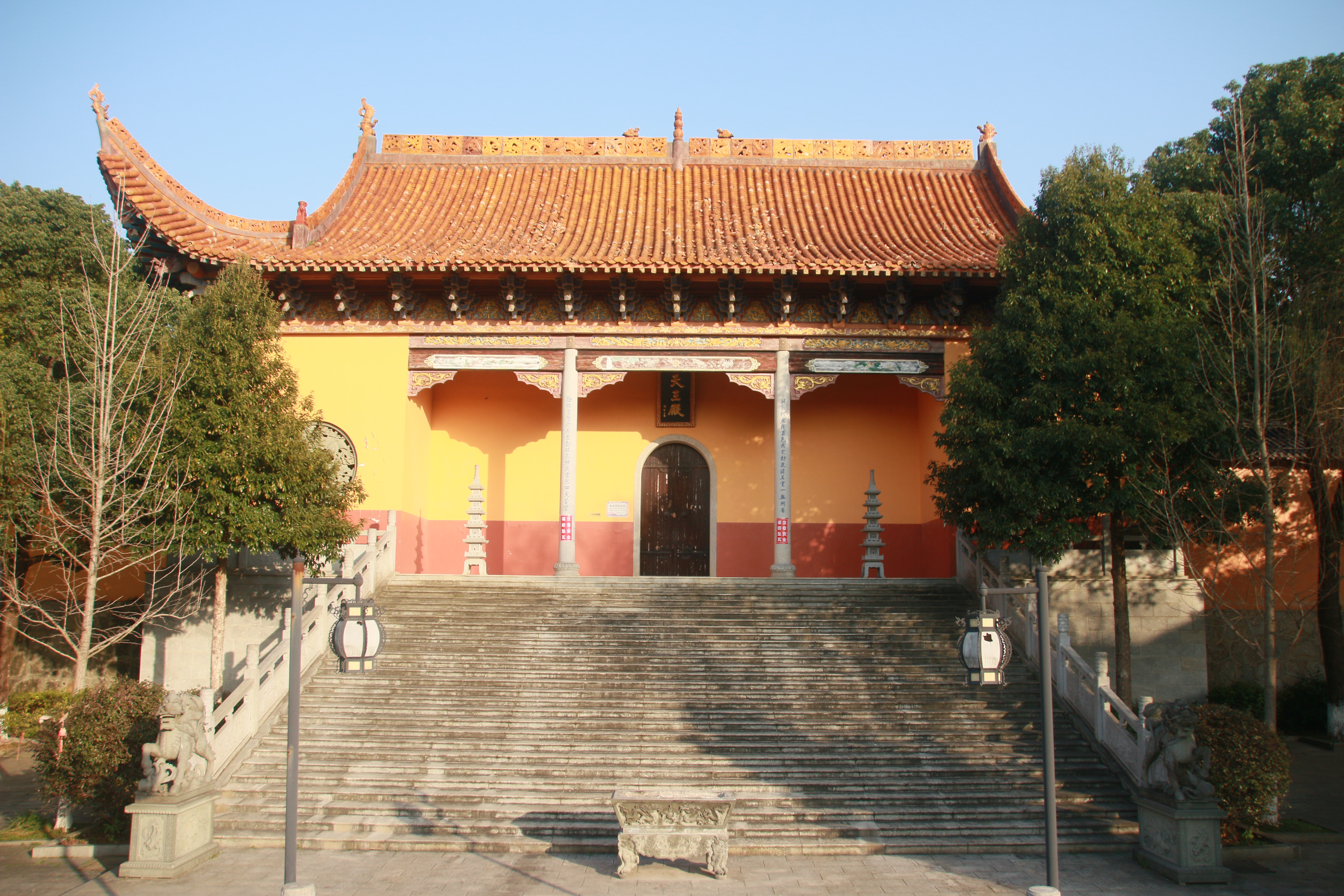
Four Heavenly Kings Hall

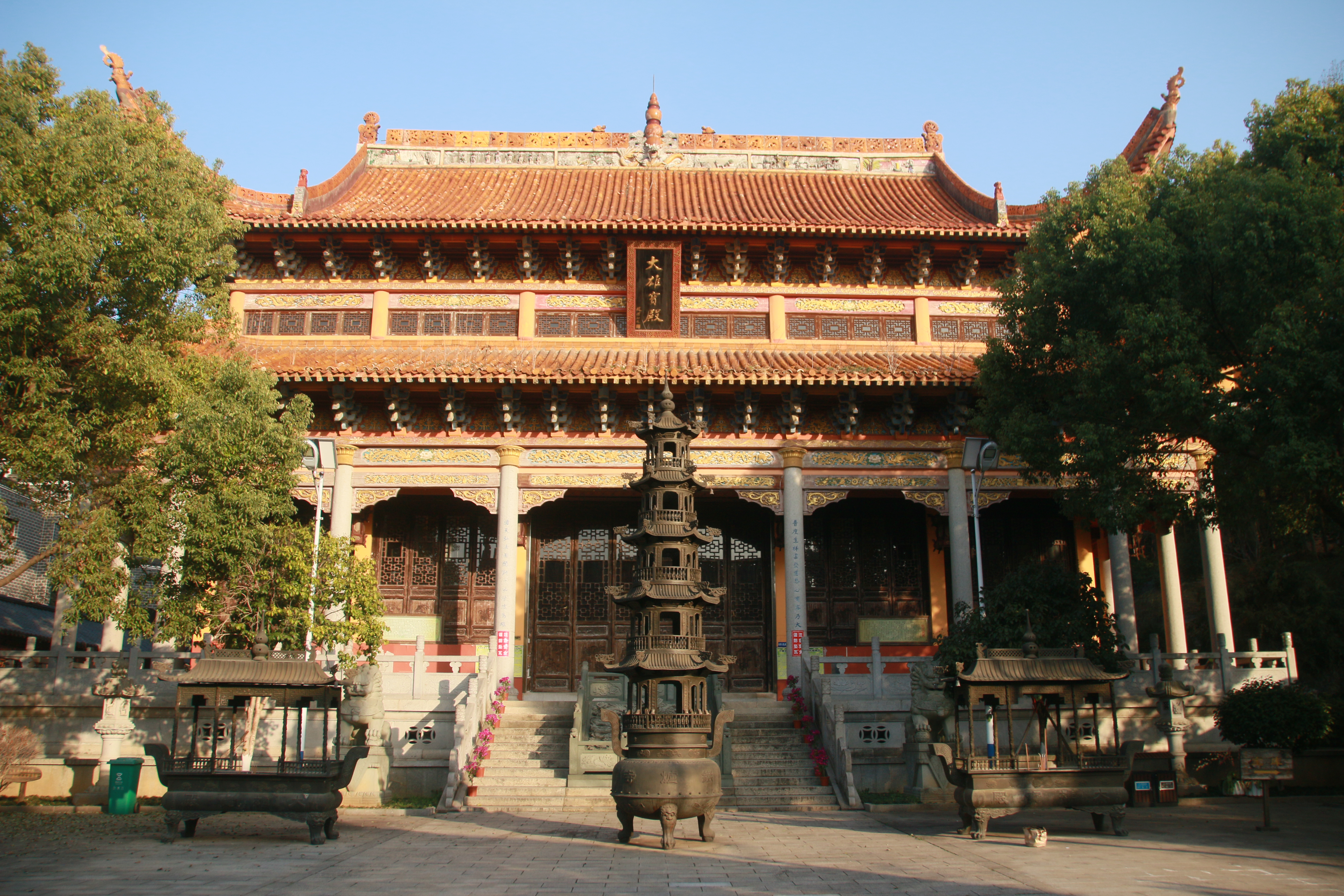
Mahavira Hall

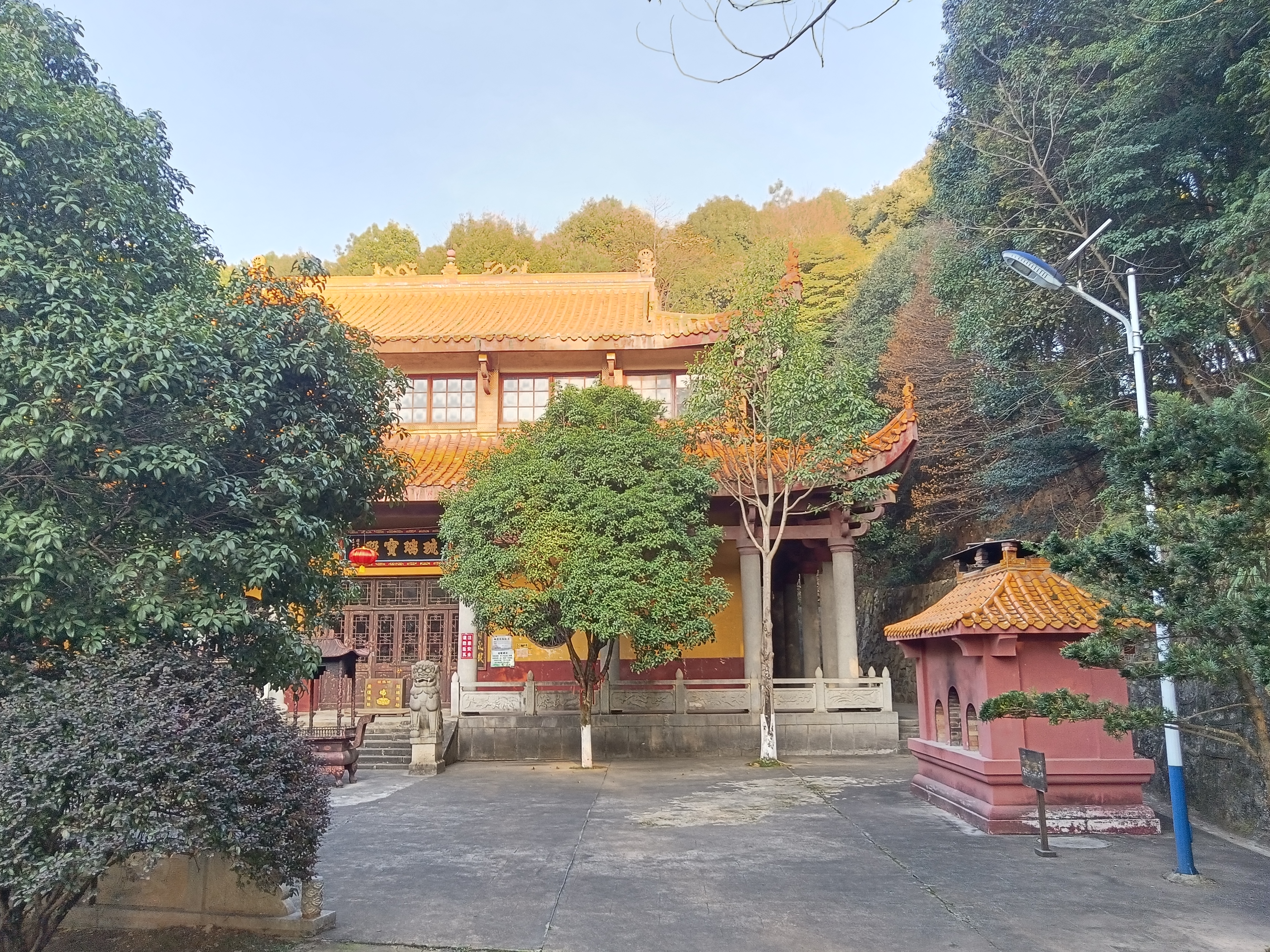
Liuli Hall

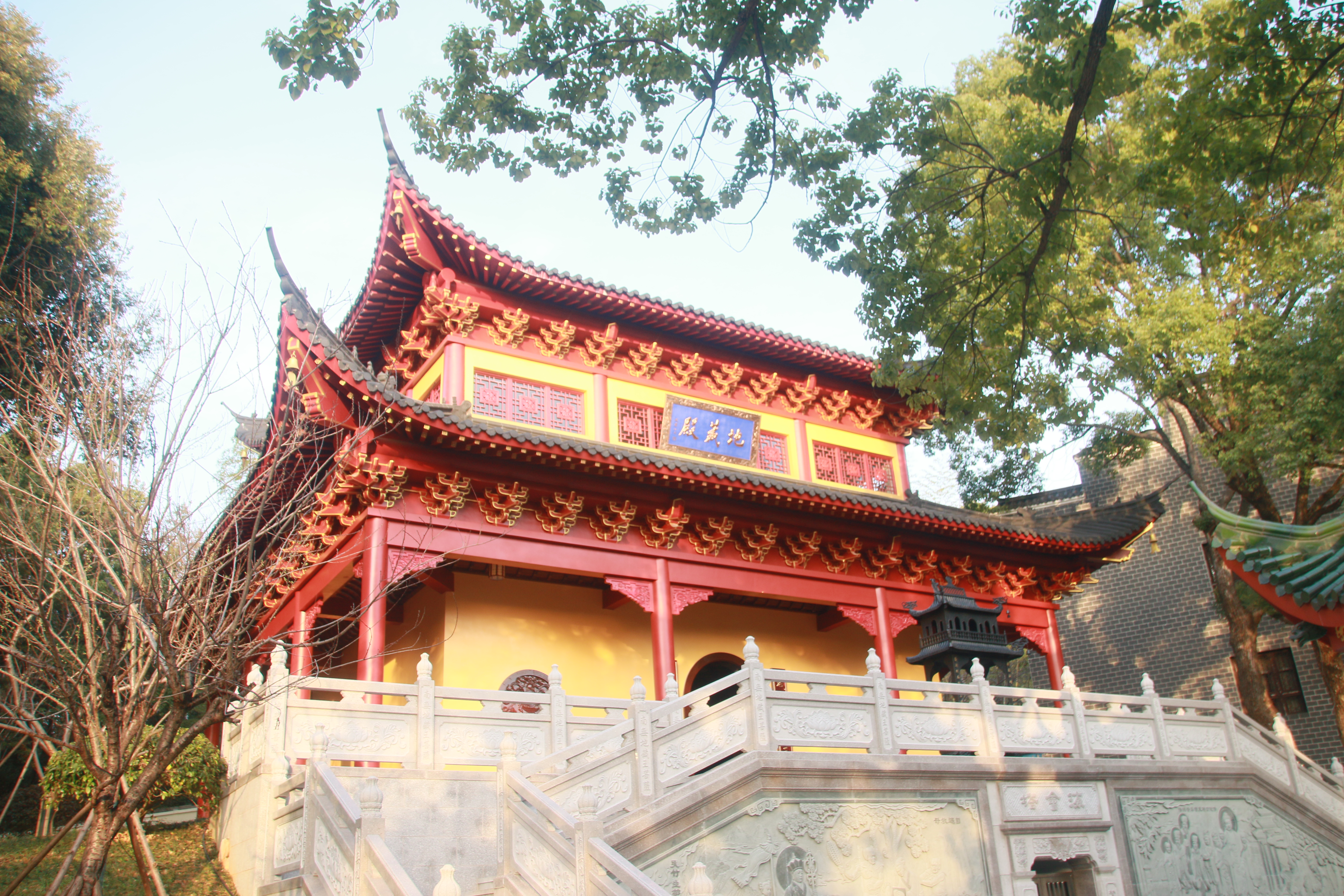
Hall of Kshitigarbha

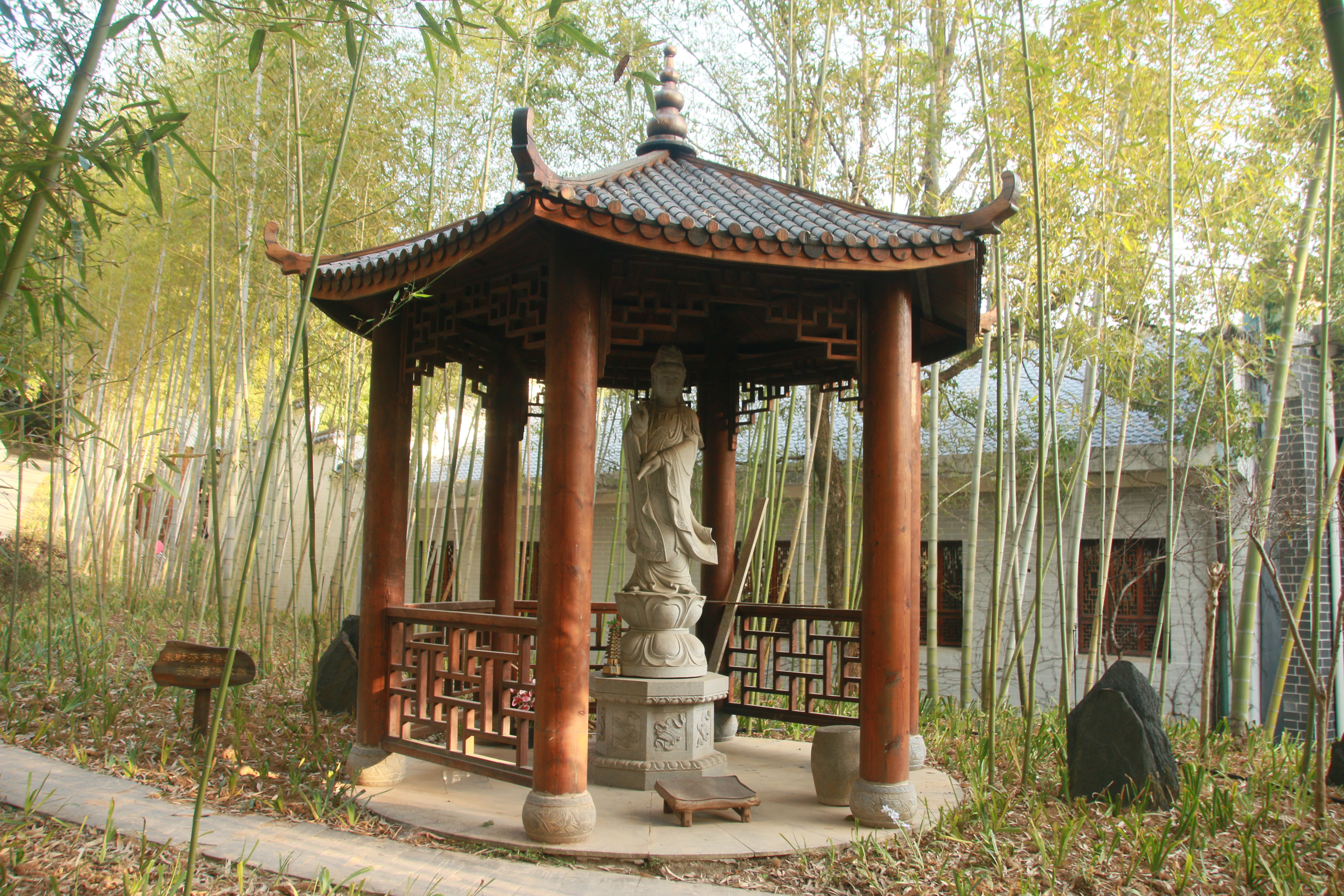
Statue of Guanyin

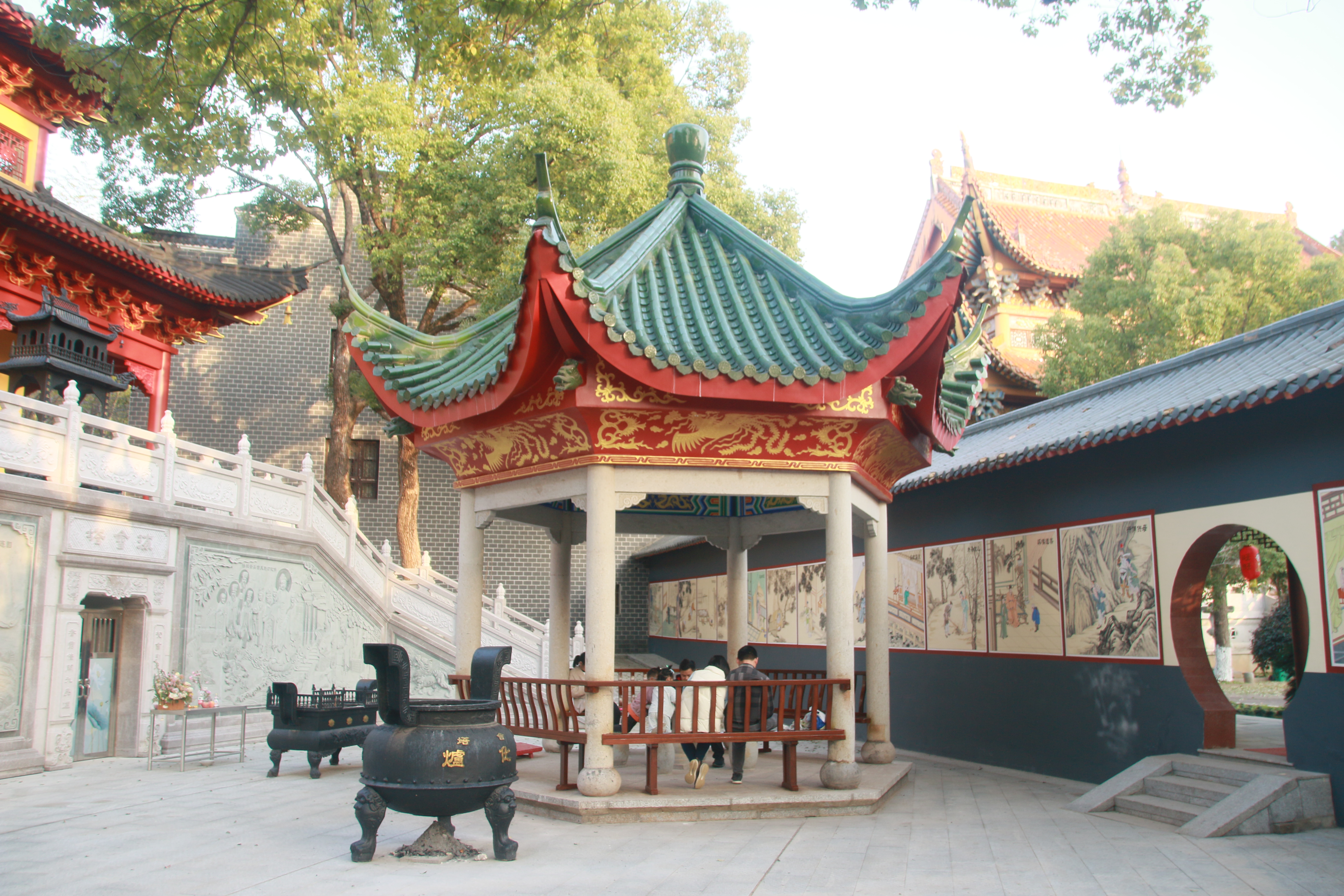
Pavilion,

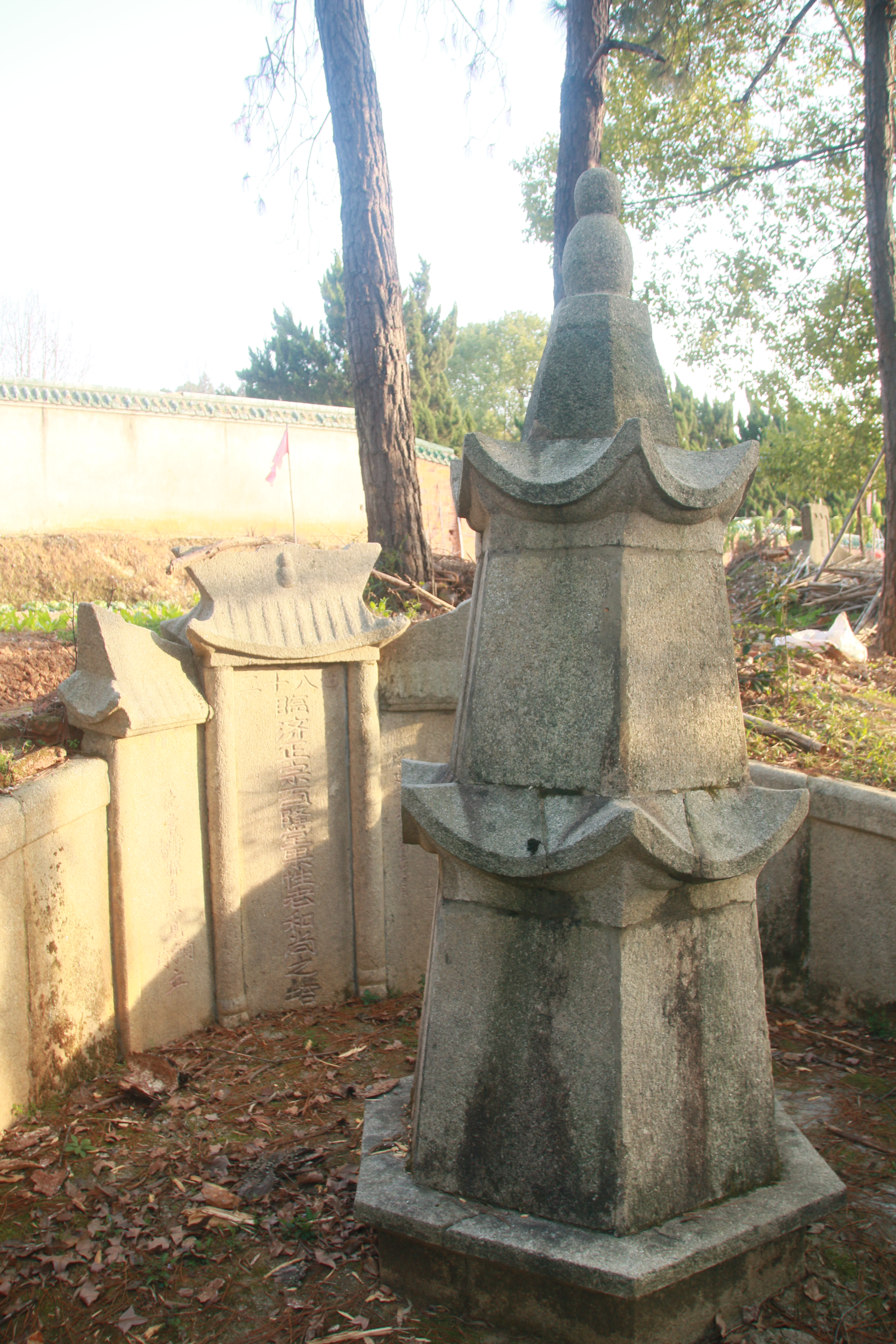
Stupa

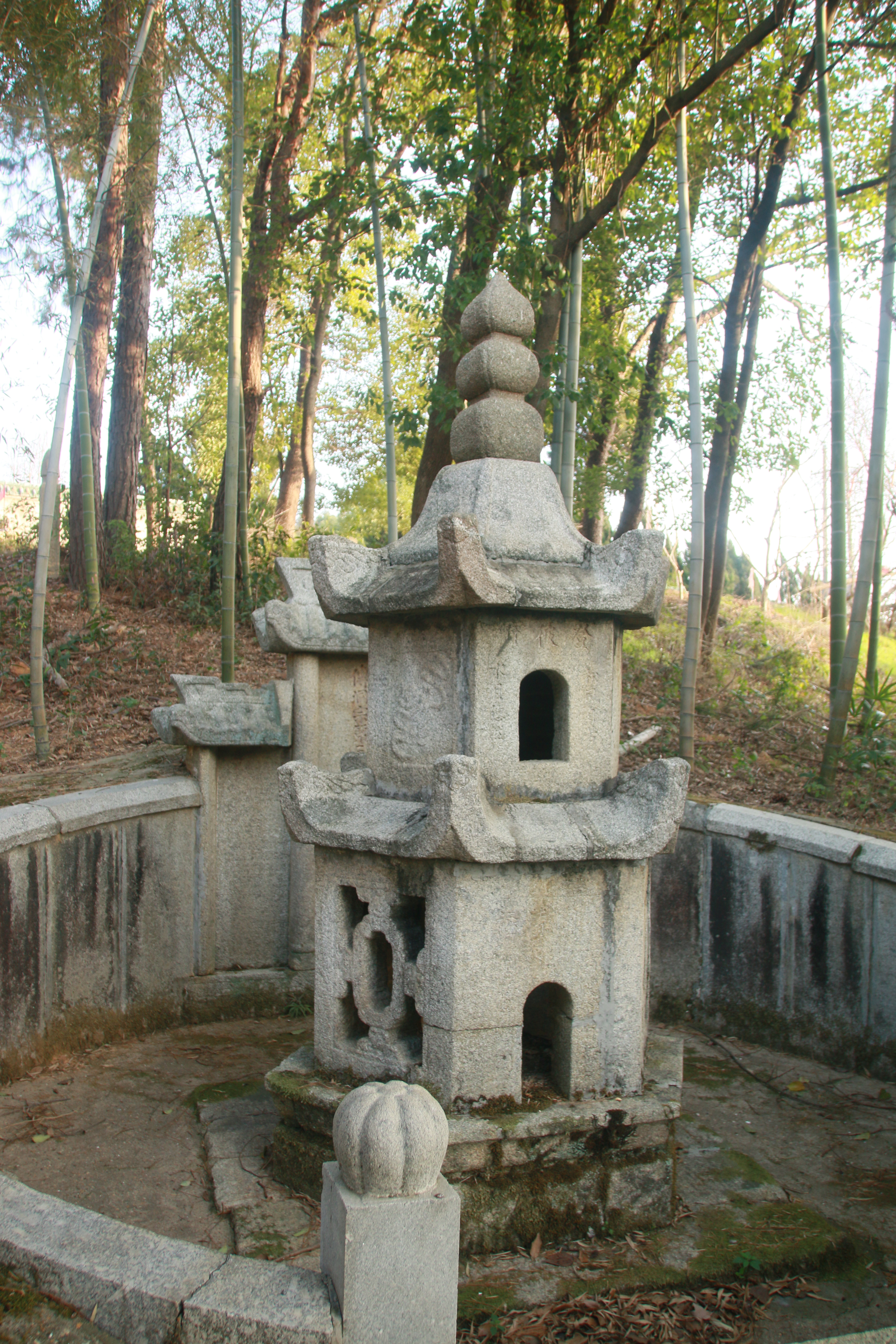
Stupa

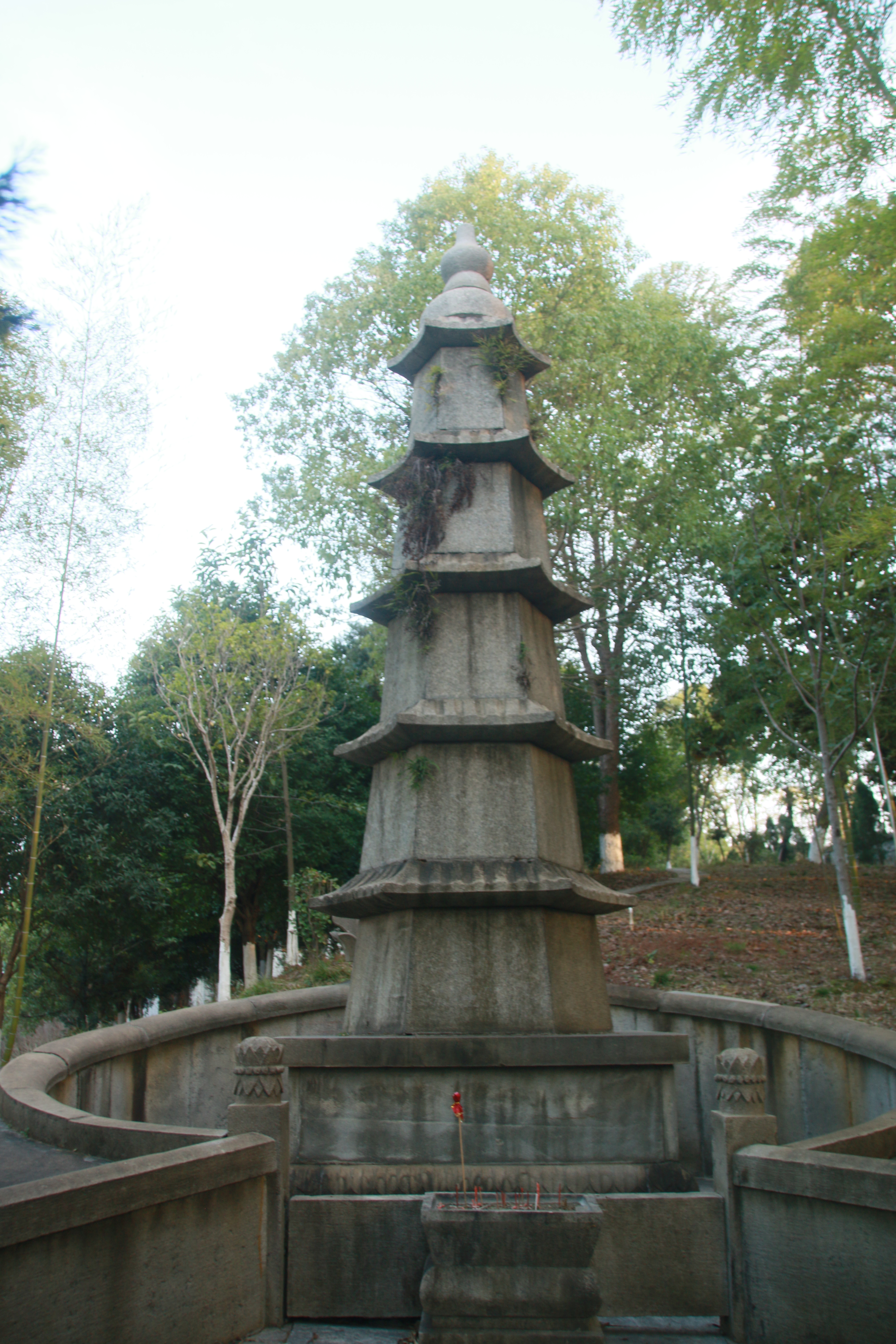
Stupa
