= Changsha Church Christianity =

- 长沙市城北堂
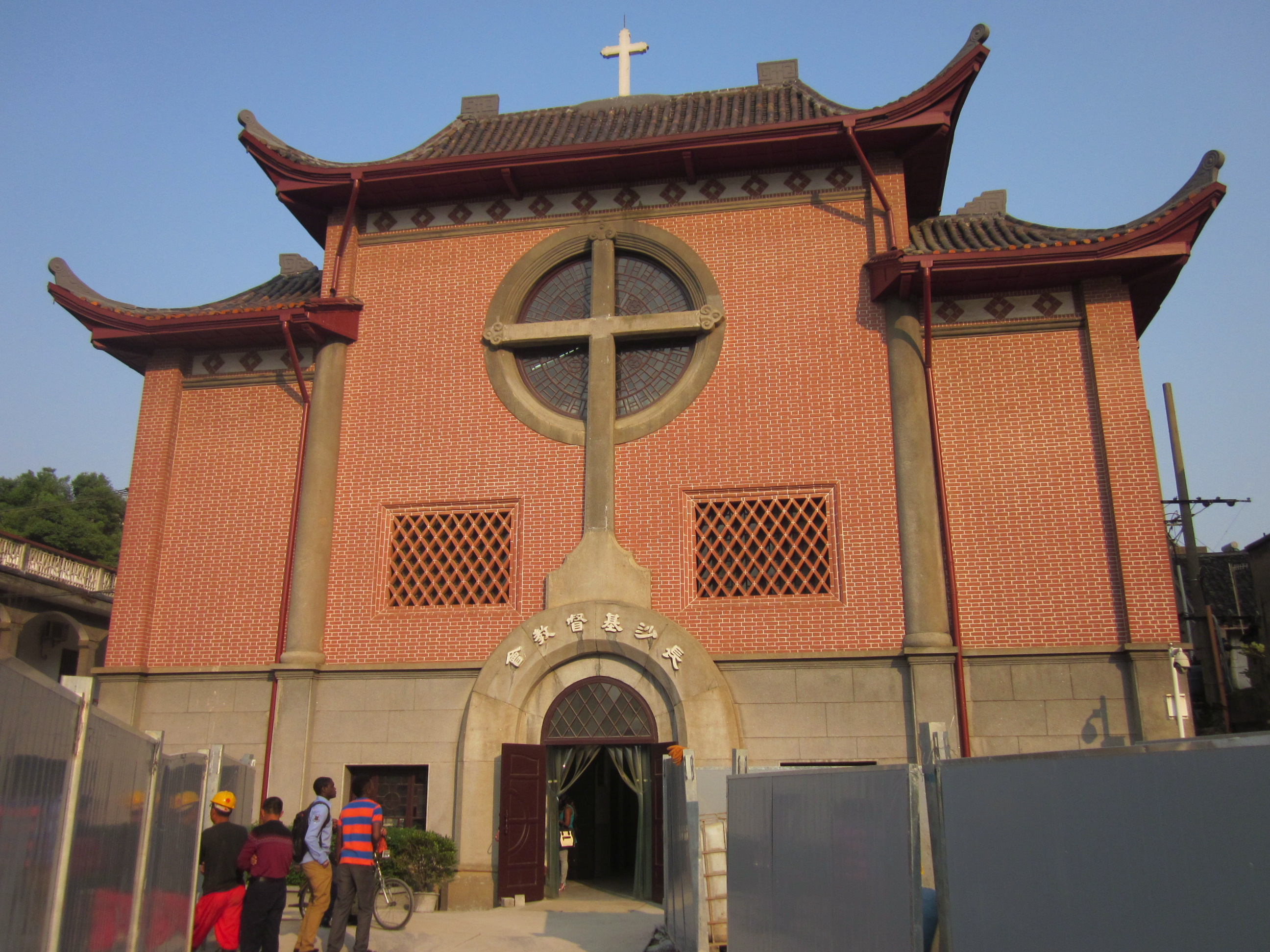
- Changsha Church Christianity

- Location in Hunan Changsha Church Christianity (China)
- 28°12′54″N 112°58′41″E
- Location: Xiangchun Street, Huangxing North Road, Changsha, Hunan
- Country: China
- Denomination: Protestantism
- Website: www.church-cb.com

History
- Status: Parish church
- Founded: 1902

Architecture
- Functional status: Active
- Architect: London Missionary Society
- Architectural type: Church building
- Style: Chinese traditional architecture
- Years built: 1902

Specifications
- Materials: Wood and bricks

Administration
- Archdiocese: Changsha
- Diocese: Changsha

Clergy
- Bishop: Ren Xia

The Changsha Church Christianity (simplified Chinese: 长沙市城北堂; traditional Chinese: 長沙市城北堂; pinyin: Chángshāshì Chéngbeǐtáng) is a 20th-century Chinese traditional architecture church. It is located in the Xiangchun Street, Kaifu District of Changsha, Hunan, China.

== History ==
It was built in 1902 by the London Missionary Society, then its management by the Presbyterian Church in the United States of America in 1912, and was destroyed by the war. It was rebuilt in 1917.

In 1947, the Hunan Chinese Independent Christian Church was founded in here.

In 1966, during the Cultural Revolution, the church closed and became a warehouse. It again opened to pilgrim in 1980.

In May 2002, it was listed as a "Historical and Cultural Sites Protected at the Provincial Level" by the Hunan government.

== List of bishops ==
Took office	Left office	Name	Native name	Notes
1980	1997	Li Yongwu	李擁吾	
1997	2008	Luo Baoluo	罗保罗	
