= Laodaohe Subdistrict =

Laodaohe Subdistrict 捞刀河街道
- Subdistrict
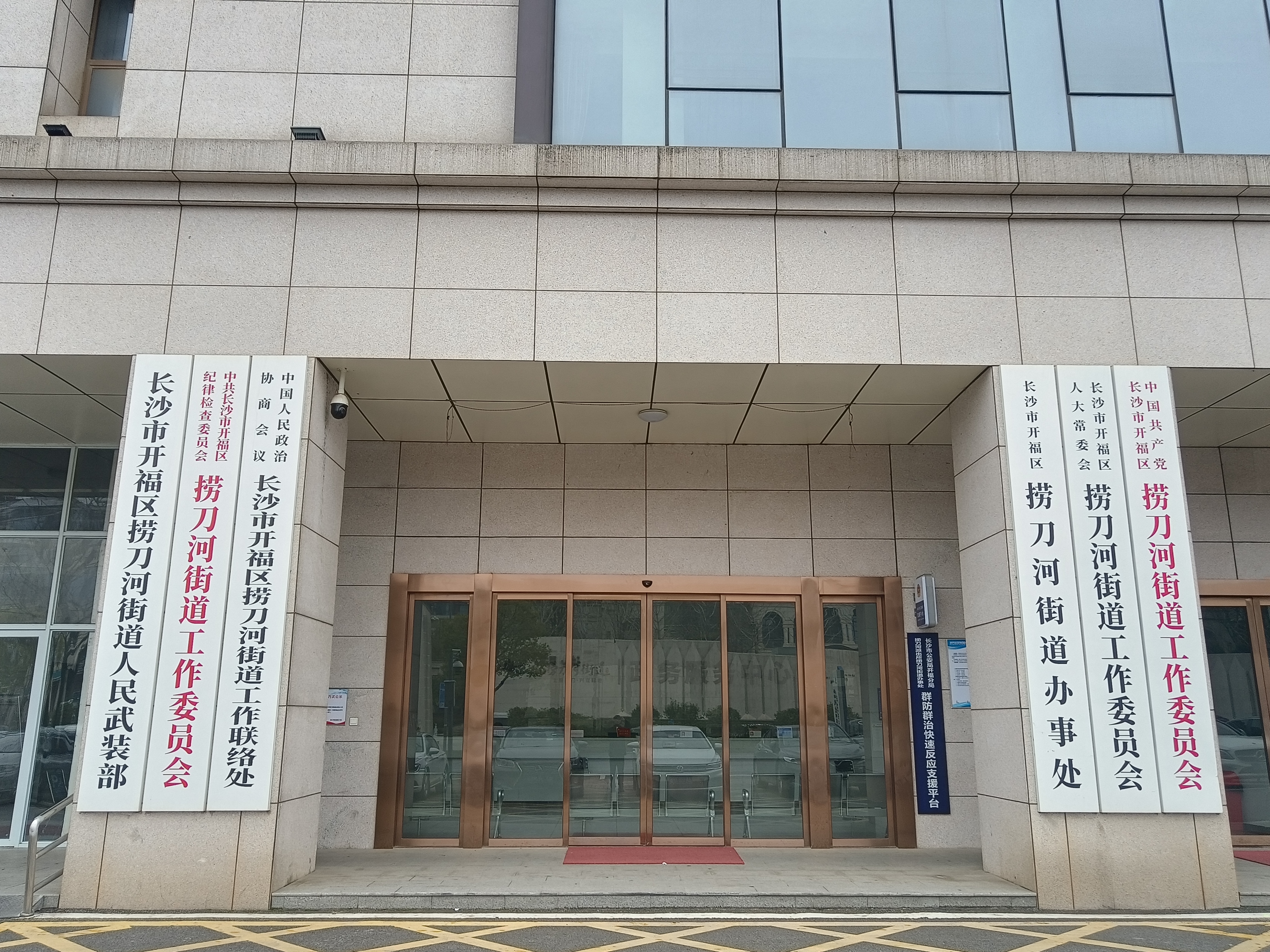
- Government Office of Laodaohe Subdistrict

- Location in Hunan
- Coordinates: 28°18′03″N 112°59′34″E
- Country: People's Republic of China
- Province: Hunan
- Prefecture-level city: Changsha
- District: Kaifu District
- Incorporated (town): 1995
- Designated (Subdistrict): 2013

Area
  - Total: 41.5 km^{2} (16.0 sq mi)

Population (2023)
  - Total: 43,000
  - Density: 1,000/km^{2} (2,700/sq mi)
- Time zone: UTC+08:00 (China Standard)
- Postal code: 410008
- Area code: 0731

Chinese name
- Simplified Chinese: 捞刀河街道
- Traditional Chinese: 撈刀河街道
Transcriptions
Standard Mandarin
- Hanyu Pinyin: Lāodāohé Jiēdào

Laodaohe Subdistrict (Chinese: 捞刀河街道) is a subdistrict in Kaifu District of Changsha, Hunan, China. As of the 2023 census it had a population of 43,000 and an area of 41.5 square kilometres (16.0 sq mi).

== Etymology ==
According to legend, during the Three Kingdoms period, Guan Yu fought in Changsha, while crossing the river by boat, his broadsword accidentally fell into the river, his deputy general Zhou Cang picked up the broadsword, and the river where the broadsword was pulled out was called "Laodao River" (捞刀河; "Lao" means pick up and "Dao" means Guan Yu's broadsword).

== Administrative division ==
As of 2023, the subdistrict is divided into three communities and three villages:

- Laodaohe Community (捞刀河社区)
- Gaoling Community (高岭社区)
- Zhongling Community (中岭社区)
- Fengyu (凤羽村)
- Baixia (白霞村)
- Luohanzhuang (罗汉庄村)

== History ==
The predecessor of Laodaohe Subdistrict was Gaoling Township (高岭乡) and belonged to Beishan District of Changsha County. In 1995, Gaoling Township and Shaping Township (沙坪乡) merged to form Laodaohe Town (捞刀河镇). It came under the jurisdiction of Kaifu District in 1996. In 2013, Laodaohe Town split into two subdistricts: Laodaohe Subdistrict and Shaping Subdistrict.

== Geography ==
Laodaohe Subdistrict is located on the north of Changsha. It is surrounded by Xiufeng Subdistrict and Wangcheng District on the northwest, Beishan Town on the southeast, and Furong District on the south.

The Laodao River and Liuyang River flow through the subdistrict.

== Economy ==
The local economy is primarily based upon commerce.

== Tourist attractions ==
Tielu Temple is a Buddhist temple in the subdistrict, and is also a well known tourist spot.

== Transportation ==
The Laodaohe Railway Station serves the town.
