= Kaifu Temple =

Buddhist temple in Changsha, Hunan, China

- 开福寺
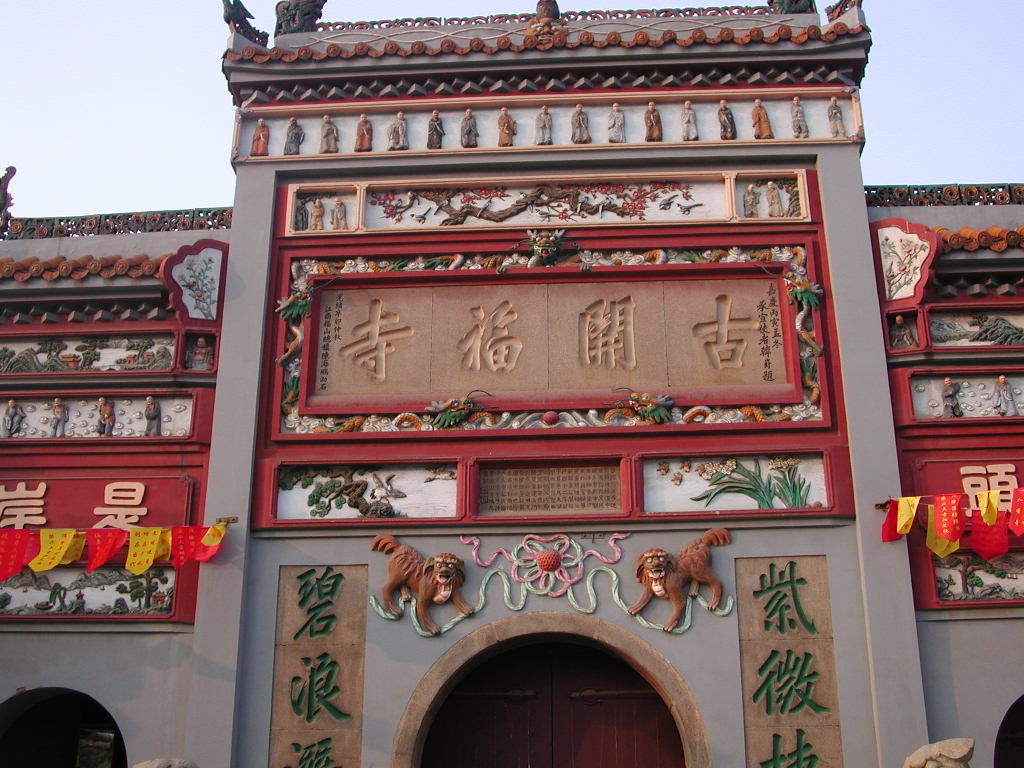
- Shanmen.

- Location within Hunan Location within China

Religion
- Affiliation: Buddhism
- Sect: Chan - Linji school
- Deity: Gautama Buddha, Manjushri and Samantabhadra

Location
- Location: Kaifu District, Changsha, Hunan
- Country: China
- Coordinates: 28°13′26″N 112°58′37″E

Architecture
- Founder: Baoning
- Completed: AD 927

Kaifu Temple (simplified Chinese: 开福寺; traditional Chinese: 開福寺; pinyin: Kāifú Sì) is a Buddhist temple located in Kaifu District of Changsha City, Hunan province in the People's Republic of China. It includes Entrance, Hall of the Great Heroes, Assisted dnyana, Dining Room, etc. Kaifu Temple belongs to the Yangqi sect and Linji school of Buddhism. The temple is built within 16,000 square metres (170,000 sq ft) of land. For the reason that it was first built earlier than Changsha city, so there is a saying that "there comes first the Kaifu Temple, then the Changsha city".

== History ==
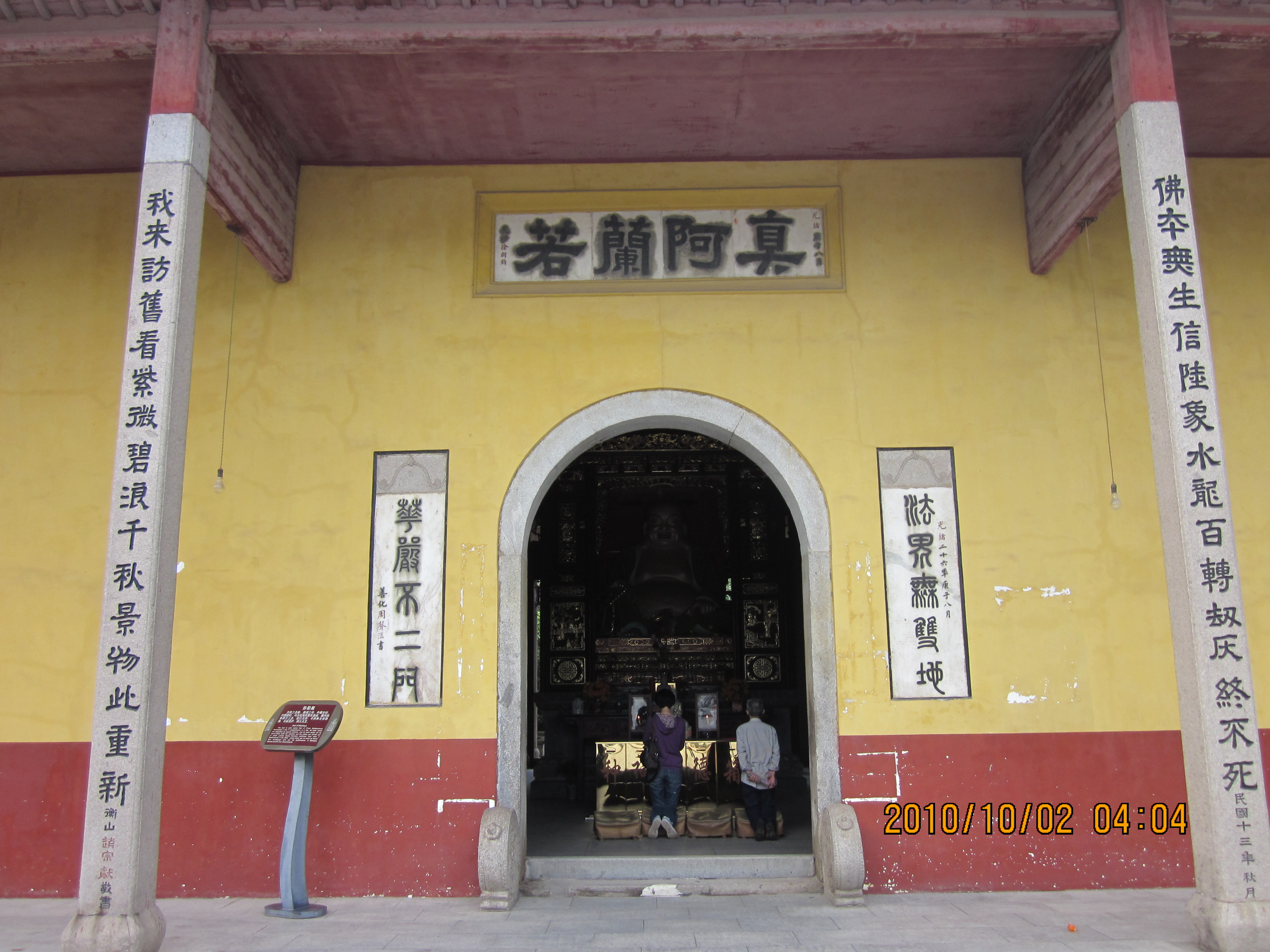
The Maitreya House.

=== Five dynasties (907–960) ===
In the late Five Dynasties and Ten Kingdoms period (907–960), Ma Yin (852–930) built a nation named "Chu" (907–951). In 927, Ma Yin's son Ma Xifan (马希范; 899–947) gave Huichun Park (会春园) to monk Baoning (保宁禅师), Bao Ning built Kaifu Temple.

=== Song dynasty (960–1279) ===
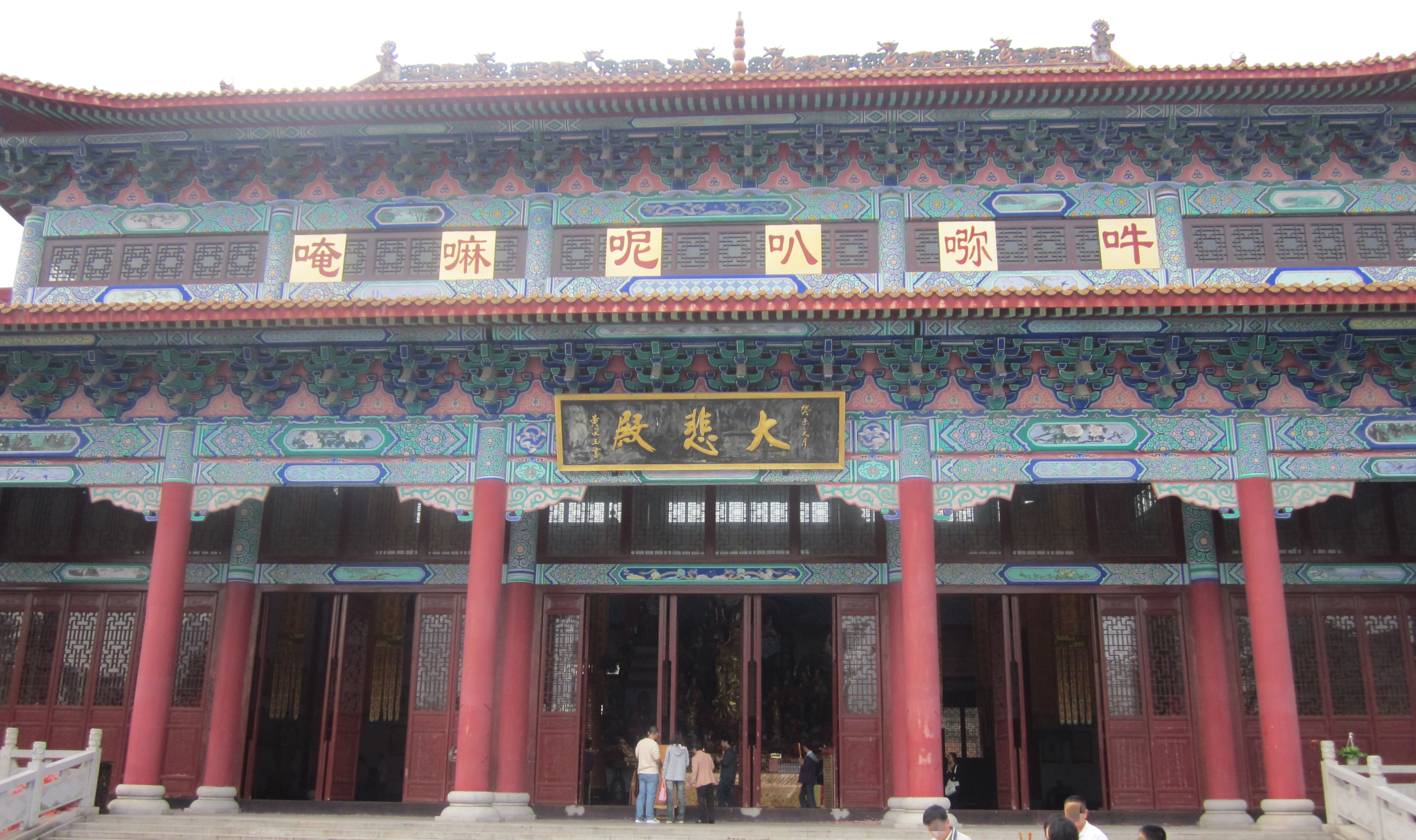
The Dabei Palace.

In the early Song dynasty (960–1276), eminent monk Hongyun (洪蕴) lived here. He was good at medical skills. Emperor Taizu (927–976) granted him a robe. Emperor Taizong (939–997) asked him for some medical prescriptions. Emperor Zhenzong (968–1022) granted him an official position.

In the period of the Emperor Shenzong (1048–1085), monk Zike (紫珂禅师) rebuilt Kaifu Temple.

In the period of the Emperor Huizong (1082–1135), the Japanese monk Juexin (法灯觉心) came to Kaifu Temple to learn Buddhadharma.

In the late Northern Song dynasty, Kaifu Temple had sixteen scenic spots.

In the Southern Song dynasty, the scholar Zhang Shi (1133–1181) wrote an article talked about Kaifu Temple.

=== Yuan dynasty (1276–1368) ===
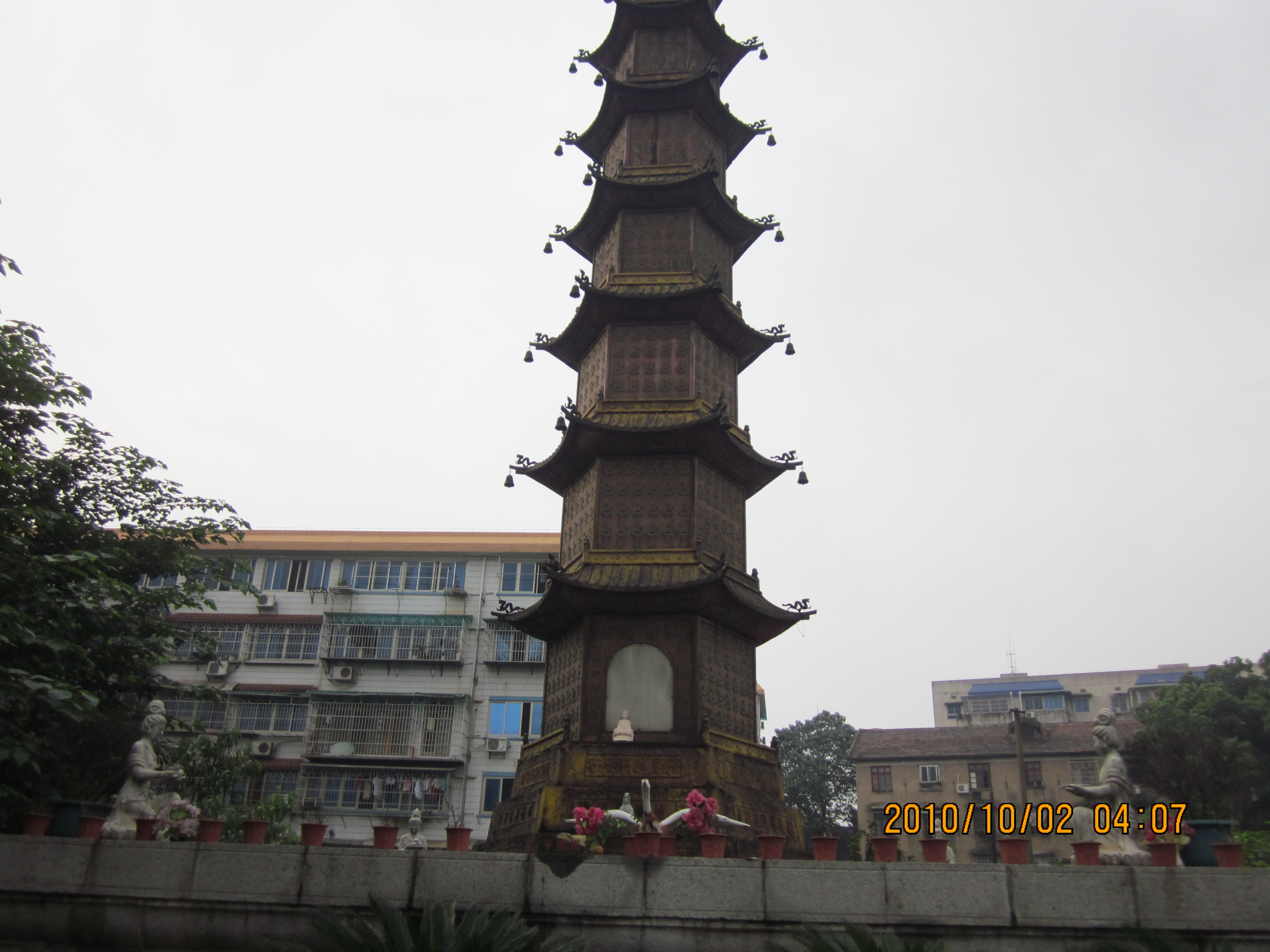
The Dagoba Pagoda.

In Yuan dynasty (1276–1368), Kaifu Temple was destroyed by Mongolian Army.

=== Ming dynasty (1368–1644) ===
In the period of the Hongwu Emperor (1368–1398), monk Chedang (彻当禅师) rebuilt Kaifu Temple.

In the period of the Jiajing Emperor (1522–1566), monk rebuilt Kaifu Temple.

In the late Ming dynasty (1368–1644), Kaifu Temple was destroyed the Qing Dynasty Army.

=== Qing dynasty (1644–1911) ===
In the period of the Shunzhi Emperor (1644–1661), monk Foguo (佛国禅师) rebuilt Kaifu Temple.

During the reign of Kangxi Emperor (1654–1722), Bo Shilong (卜世龙), Zhou Zhaonan (周召南), Lang Yongqing (郎永青) and Li Rongzong (李荣宗) rebuilt Kaifu Temple.

During the reign of Qianlong Emperor (1736–1796), Liang Guozhi (梁国治) rebuilt Kaifu Temple.

In 1886, in the twelfth year of the age of Guangxu (1875–1908) of Guangxu Emperor (1871–1908), monks Jichan (寄禅禅师), Liyun (笠云禅师) and poet Wang Kaiyun (王闿运) organized a literary organization. Liyun built a Buddhist college.

=== Republic of China (1912–1949) ===
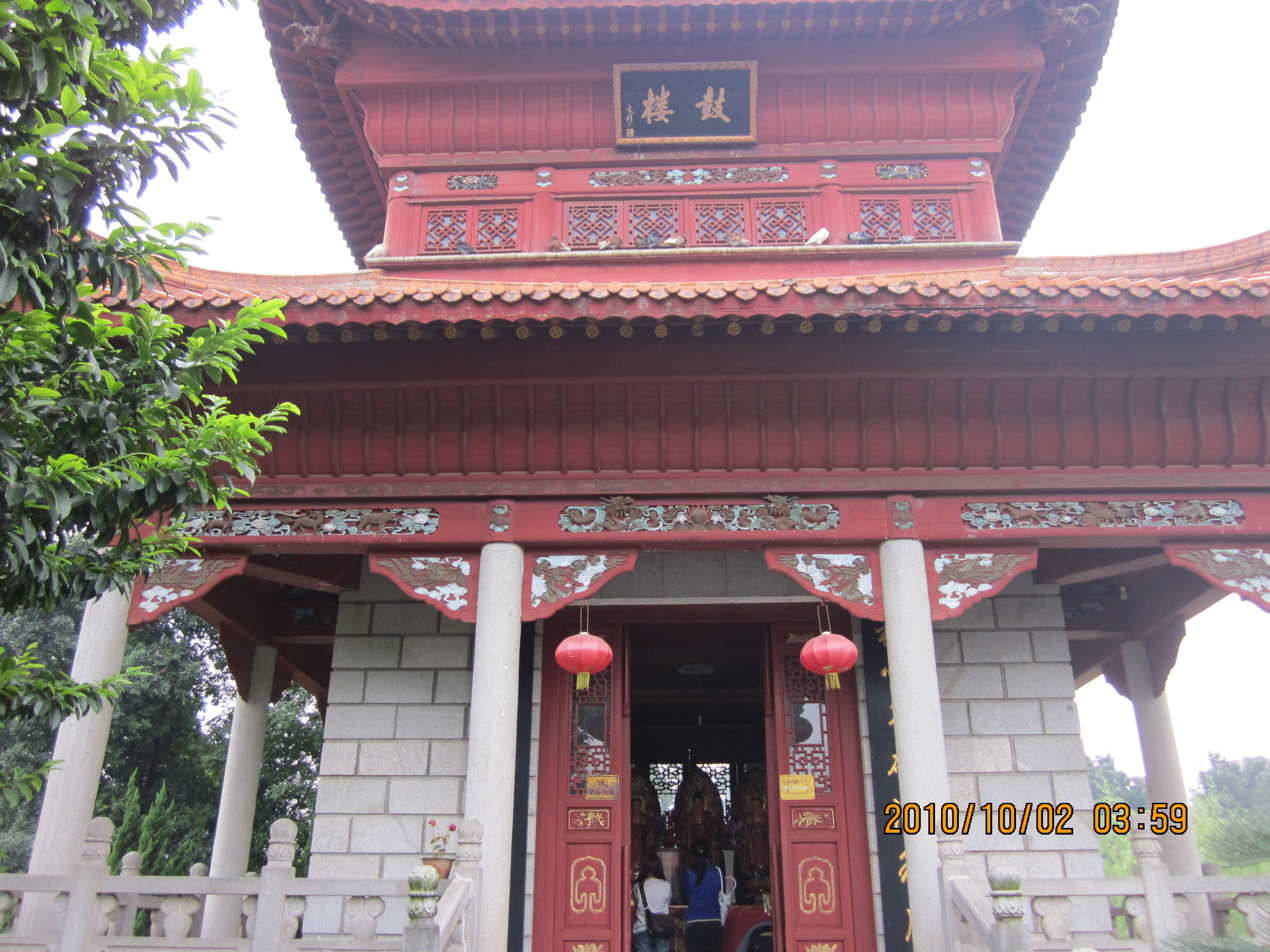
The Drum Tower.

During the Chinese Civil War, Kaifu Temple was destroyed by the war.

=== People's Republic of China ===
In the early People's Republic of China, monk Mingzhen (明真禅师) rebuilt Kaifu Temple, but in the Cultural Revolution, many of cultural relics were either stolen or destroyed.

In 1965, Kaifu Temple was listed as a provincial culture and relics site.

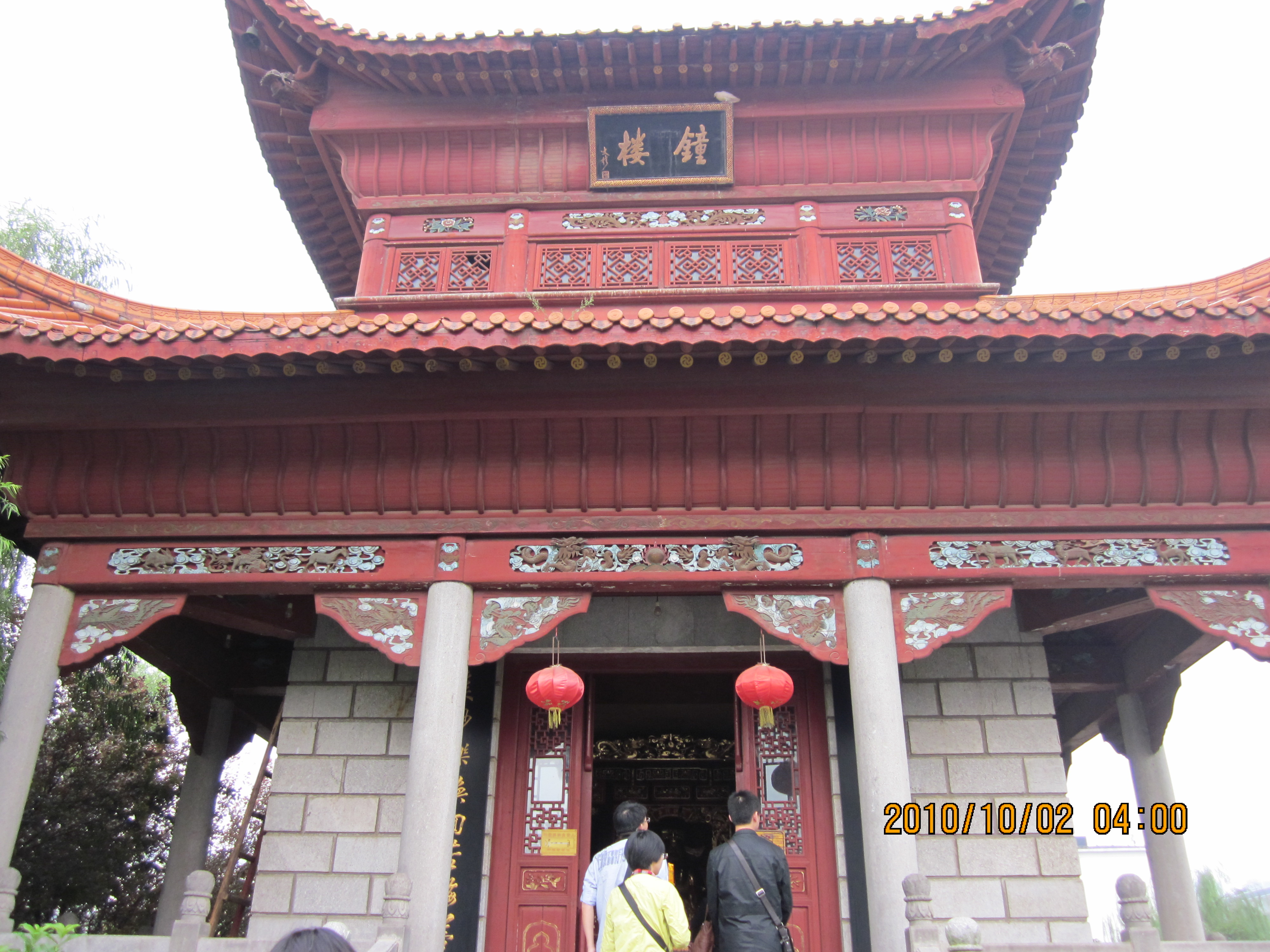
The Bell Tower.

In 1983, Kaifu Temple was listed as a National Key Buddhist Temple in Han Chinese Area.

In 1994, the abbot Nengjing (能净主持) built the Monks Dorm, the Free Life Pond, Bell Tower, Drum Tower, rebuilt the Grand Buddha Hall, Meditation Hall, Praying Hall, Monastic Dining Hall, Monastic Reception and the Depositary of Buddhist Texts.

In 2004, Kaifu Temple extended new buildings.

In 2011, the People's Government of Kaifu District extended Kaifu Temple, recovered the sixteen scenic spots.
