= Kaifu, Changsha =

Kaifu 开福区
- District
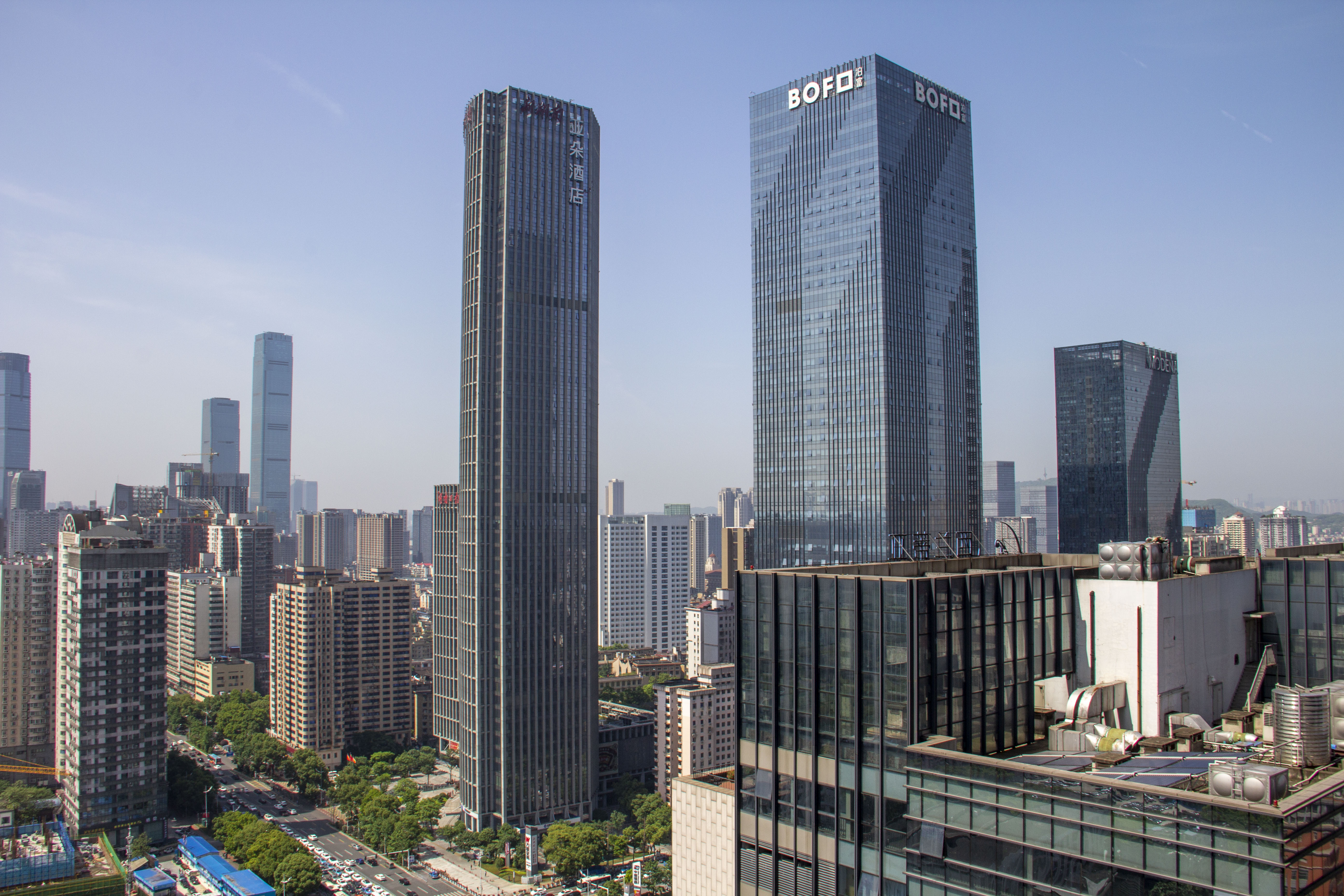

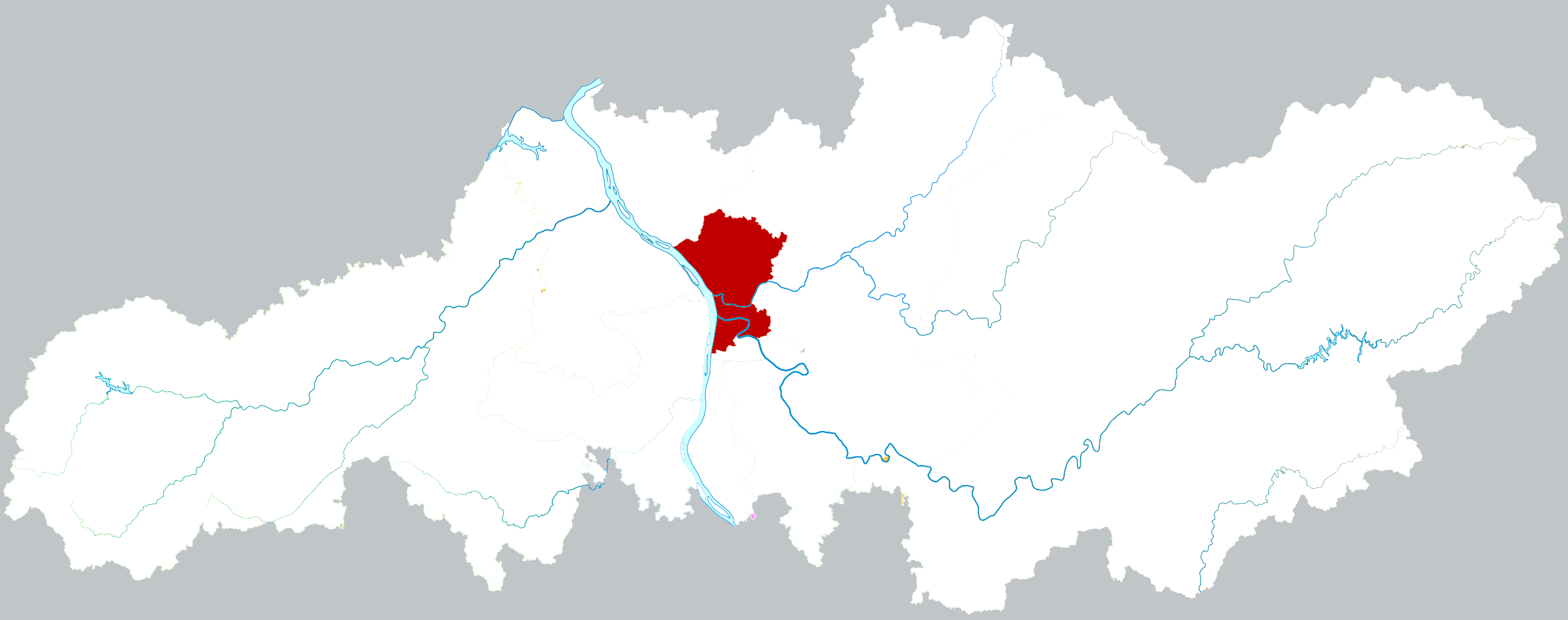
- Location of Kaifu District within Changsha

- Location in Hunan
- Coordinates: 28°15′24″N 112°59′09″E
- Country: People's Republic of China
- Province: Hunan
- Prefecture-level city: Changsha
- Seat: Furongbeilu

Area
  - Total: 188.73 km^{2} (72.87 sq mi)

Population (2014)
  - Total: 595,000
  - Density: 3,150/km^{2} (8,170/sq mi)
- Time zone: UTC+8 (China Standard)
- Postal code: 410005

Kaifu District (Chinese: 开福区; pinyin: Kāifú Qū) is one of six urban districts of the prefecture-level city of Changsha, the capital of Hunan Province, China. The district is bordered by Furong and Tianxin Districts to the south, Changsha County to the east and northeast, Wangcheng District to the north, Yuelu and Wangcheng Districts across the Xiang river to the west. Located in the central Changsha, Kaifu covers 188.73 km^{2} (72.87 sq mi) with population of 595,000, registered population of 452,168 (as of 2014). The district has 16 subdistricts under its jurisdiction, the government seat is at Furongbeilu subdistrict.

It has a surface of 72.87 mi^{2} and a population of 595,000 according to the census in 2014.

== History ==
Kaifu District was formed on 22 April 1996 as a result of adjusting the administrative districts of Changsha. It covers the historic North District, Fu'an Township (福安乡) of the former Suburb District, Laodaohe Town (捞刀河镇) of Changsha County, Xianing Township (霞凝乡) of Wangcheng County.

== Subdivisions ==
According to the result on adjustment of township-level divisions of Kaifu District on November 19, 2015, Kaifu has 16 subdistricts under its jurisdiction. They are:

16 subdistricts

- Dongfenglu (东风路街道)
- Furongbeilu (芙蓉北路街道)
- Hongshan (洪山街道)
- Laodaohe (捞刀河街道)
- Liuyanghe (浏阳河街道)
- Qingshuitang (清水塘街道)
- Qingzhuhu (青竹湖街道)
- Shaping (沙坪街道)
- Sifangping (四方坪街道)
- Tongtaijie (通泰街街道)
- Wangluyuan (望麓园街道)
- Wujialing (伍家岭街道)
- Xiangyalu (湘雅路街道)
- Xinhe (新河街道)
- Xiufeng (秀峰街道)
- Yuehu (月湖街道)

== Economy ==
According to preliminary accounting of the statistical authority, the gross domestic product of Tianxin District in 2017 was 92 billion yuan (13.63 billion US dollars), up by 8.8 percent over the previous year. Of this total, the value added of the primary industry was 130 million yuan (19.25 million US dollars), up by -32.6 percent, that of the secondary industry was 15.15 billion yuan (2.24 billion US dollars), up by 3.7 percent and that of the tertiary industry was 76.72 billion yuan (11.36 billion US dollars), up by 10 percent. The value added of the primary industry accounted for 0.14 percent of the GDP; that of the secondary industry accounted for 16.47 percent; and that of the tertiary industry accounted for 83.39 percent.

== Tourist attractions ==
The district is also known for Kaifu Temple. For the reason that it was first built earlier than Changsha City, so there is a saying that "there comes first the Kaifu Temple, then the Changsha City". Tielu Temple and Hongshan Temple are also famous Buddhist temples in the district.

== See also ==
- Changsha Church Christianity
