= Yanghu (disambiguation) =

Yanghu is a subdistrict of Yuelu District, Changsha, Hunan, China.

Yanghu may also refer to:

- Bernard Auguste Kouemo Yanghu, Cameroonian filmmaker
- Yanghu Wetland station, metro station in Yuelu District
  - Yanghu Wetland Park, near the station
- Yanghu ECO. Town station, metro station in Yuelu District
- Yanghu, Dongzhi (Chinese: 洋湖镇), a town of Dongzhi County, Chizhou, Anhui
- Yanghu, Huangshan (Chinese: 阳湖镇), a town of Tunxi District, Huangshan, Anhui
- Yanghu, Yingshang (Chinese: 杨湖镇), a town of Yingshang County, Fuyang, Anhui
