= Xie Zilong Photography Museum =

Museum in Changsha, China

- 谢子龙影像艺术馆
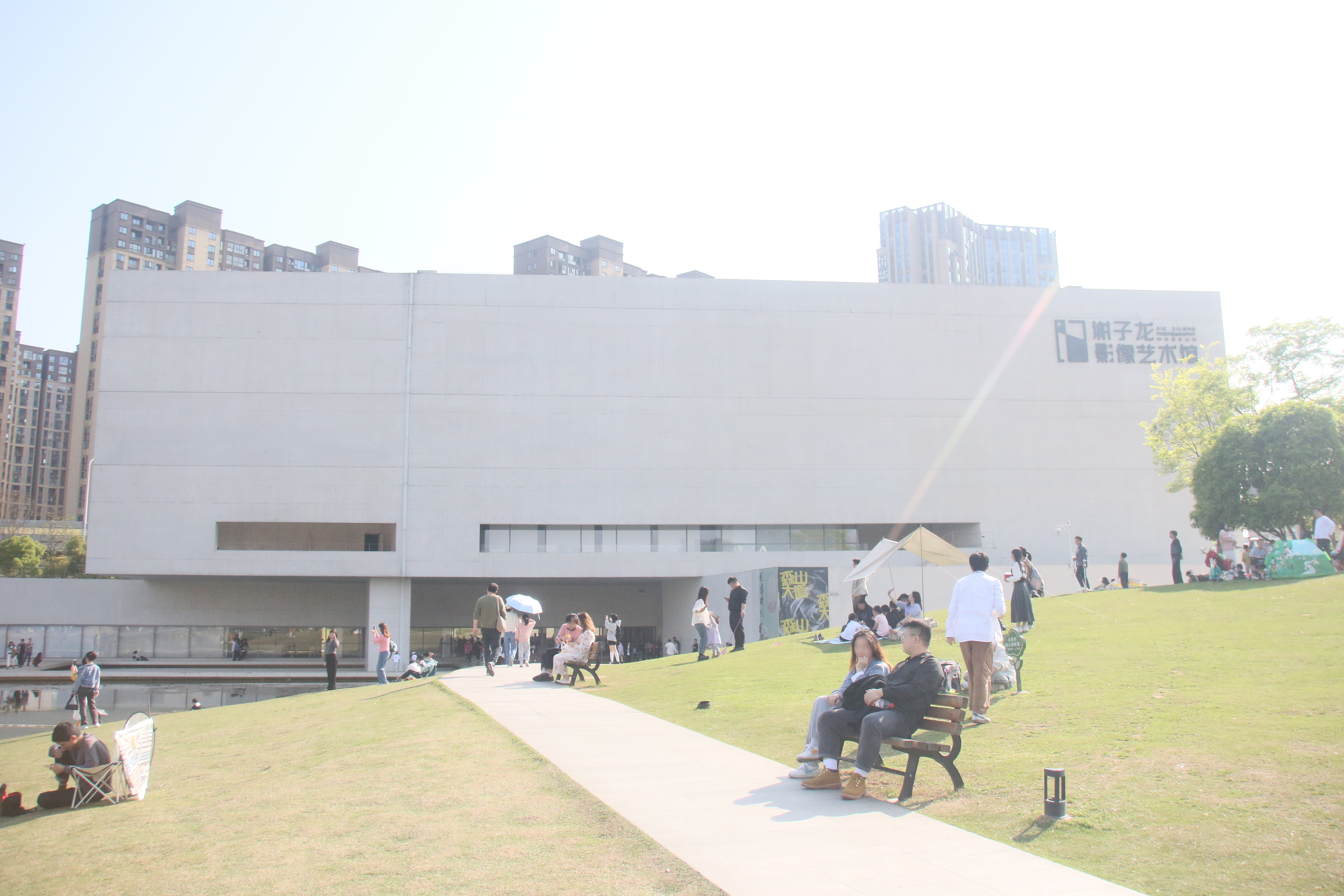
- Xie Zilong Photography Museum in 2023

- Location within Hunan
- Established: 16 September 2017; 8 years ago
- Location: Yuelu District, Changsha, Hunan, China
- Coordinates: 28°07′26″N 112°57′14″E
- Collections: Photography works, books
- Founder: Xie Zilong
- President: Xie Zilong
- Architect: Wei Chunyu (魏春雨)
- Website: www.x-museum.com

Chinese name
- Simplified Chinese: 谢子龙影像艺术馆
- Traditional Chinese: 謝子龍影像藝術館
Transcriptions
Standard Mandarin
- Hanyu Pinyin: Xiè Zǐlóng Yǐngxiàng Yìshùguǎn

The Xie Zilong Photography Museum (Chinese: 谢子龙影像艺术馆) is a photography museum in Yuelu District of Changsha, Hunan, China. It covers an area of approximately 6,666.67-square-metre (71,759.4 sq ft) and has a construction area of approximately 10,000-square-metre (110,000 sq ft). It is adjacent to Yanghu Wetland Park and Li Zijian Art Museum.

== History ==
Xie Zilong Photography Museum was officially opened to the public on 16 September 2017.

== Collections ==
- Asian Craftsman Craftsmanship Exhibition
- German Photography from the 19th century to today
- German Classic Lulai Camera Prototype Collection Exhibition
- Felicity Bito and the earliest Beijing Image
- Image Works Exhibition
- Tucson Publishing Collection Level Book Exhibition

== Public Access ==
Xie Zilong Photography Museum open to visitors for free. It is closed on Mondays, and is open from 10:00 am to 18:00 pm daily.

== Gallery ==
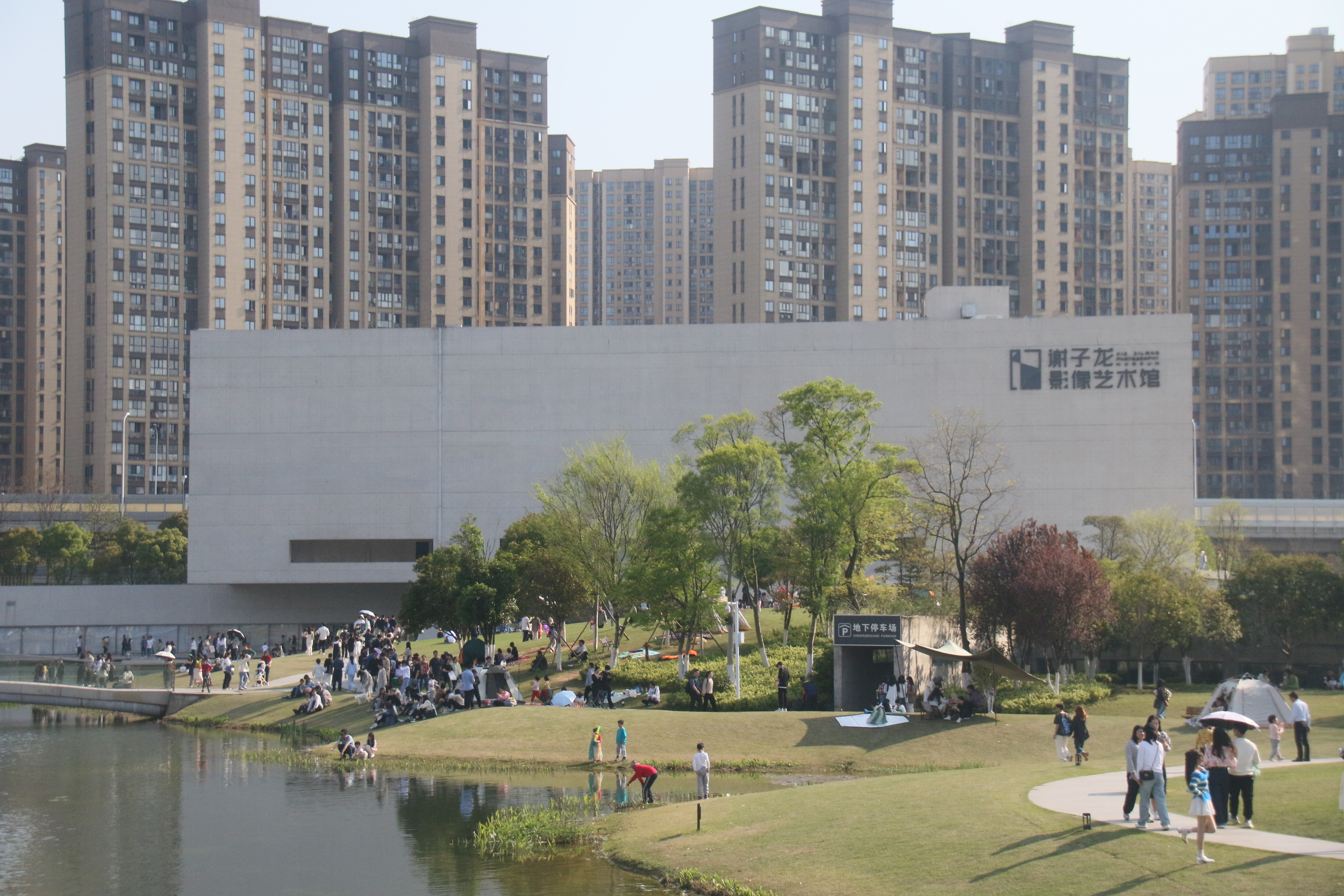
Xie Zilong Photography Museum

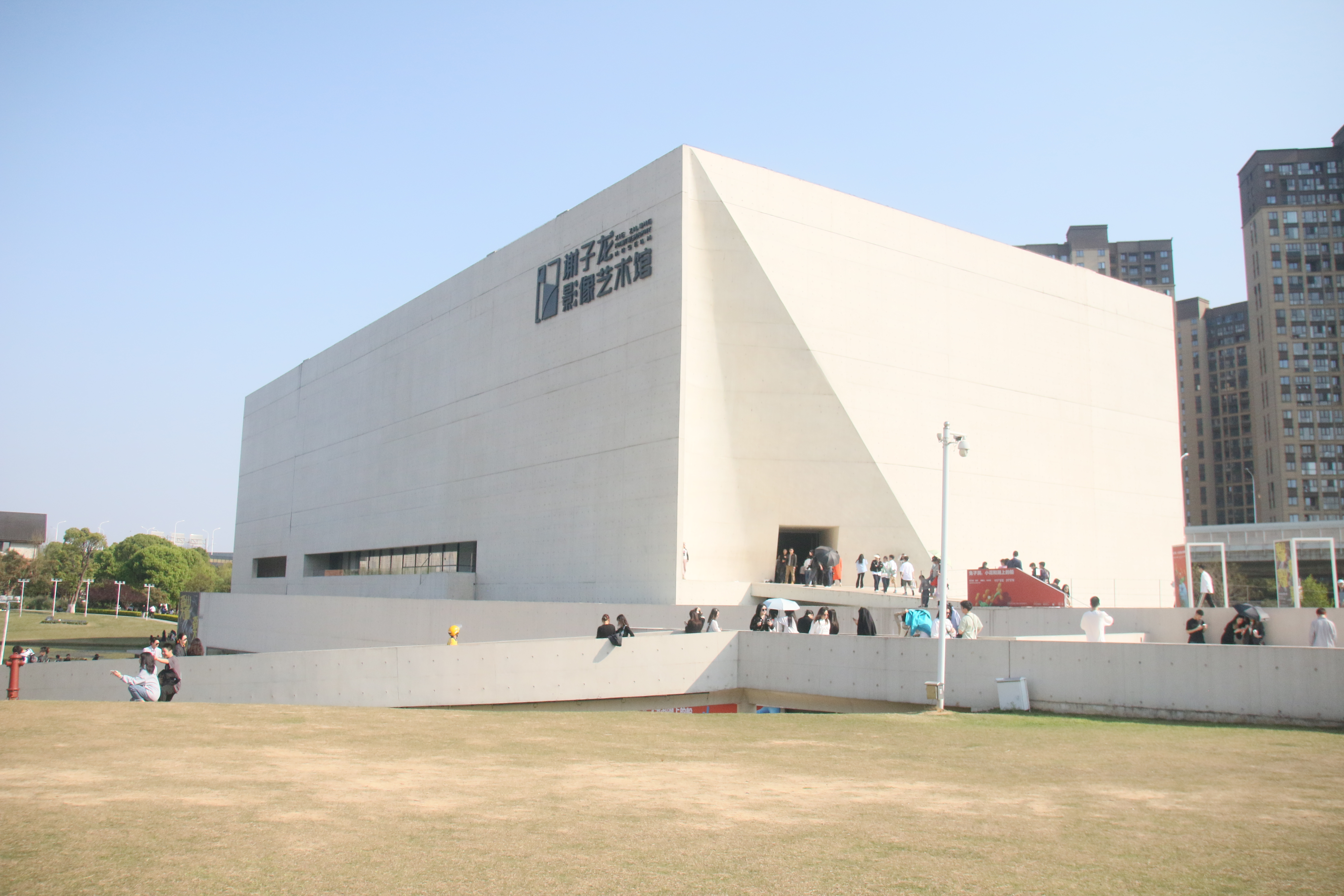
Xie Zilong Photography Museum

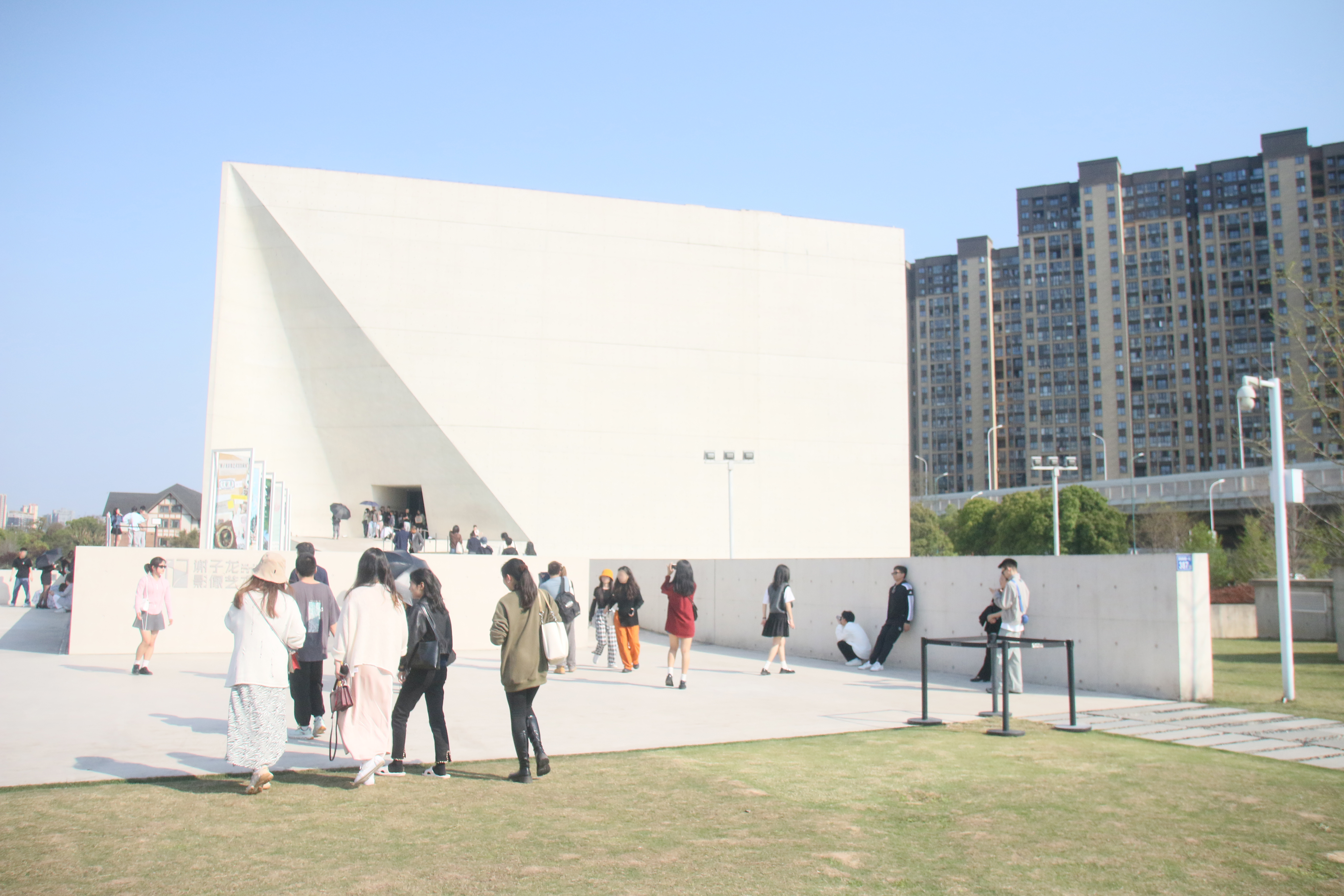
Xie Zilong Photography Museum
