= Li Zijian Art Museum =

Art museum in Changsha, China

- 李自健美术馆
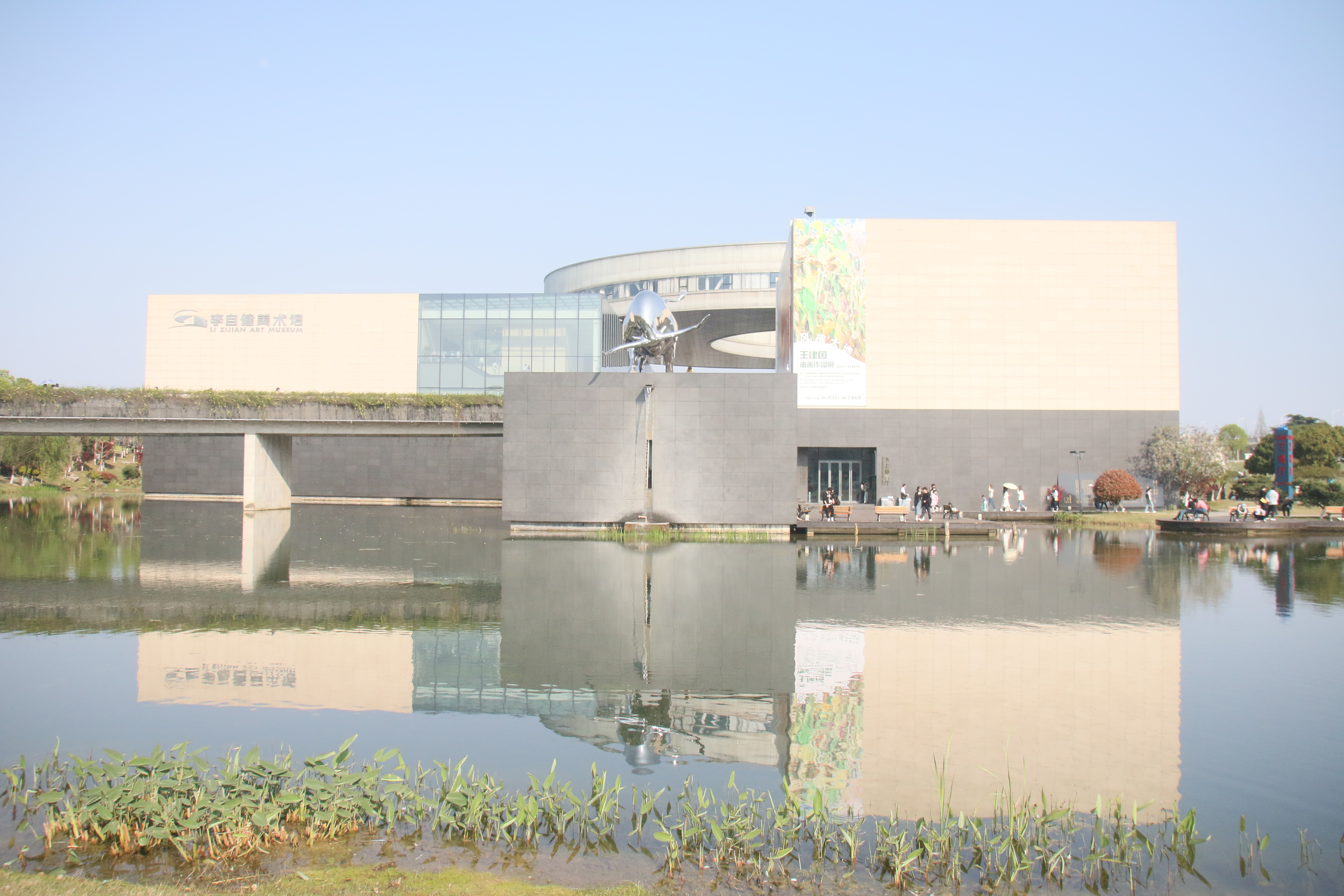
- Li Zijian Art Museum in 2023

- Location within Hunan
- Established: 1 October 2016; 9 years ago
- Location: Yuelu District, Changsha, Hunan, China
- Coordinates: 28°07′31″N 112°57′24″E
- Collections: Oil Paintings by Li Zijian, sketches by Chen Xichuan, One-stroke Calligraphies by Hsing Yun
- Founder: Li Zijian
- President: Li Zijian
- Website: www.lizijianmsg.com

Chinese name
- Simplified Chinese: 李自健美术馆
- Traditional Chinese: 李自健美術館
Transcriptions
Standard Mandarin
- Hanyu Pinyin: Lǐ Zìjiàn Meǐshùguǎn

The Li Zijian Art Museum (Chinese: 李自健美术馆) is an art museum located in Yuelu District of Changsha, Hunan, China. It is adjacent to Yanghu Wetland Park and Xiangjiang New Area Planning Exhibition Hall. Li Zijian Art Museum is the largest private art museum in Hunan. It covers an area of 120,000-square-metre (1,300,000 sq ft) and a building area of 25,000-square-metre (270,000 sq ft), comprises the Li Zijian Oil Painting Exhibition Hall (李自健油画展厅), Chen Xichuan Sketch Exhibition Hall (陈西川素描展厅), Venerable Master Hsing Yun One-stroke Calligraphy Exhibition Hall (星云大师一笔字书法展厅), and Water Music Hall.

== History ==
Groundbreaking began in May 2014 for the Li Zijian Art Museum in Yuelu District. Construction began in December 2014 and completed on October 1, 2016.

On May 28, 2017, the foundation stone laying ceremony of "Li Zijian Art Museum" was held in Changsha Dahexi Pilot Zone Yanghu Headquarters Economic Zone. Master Hsing Yun, Li Weiwei, Liu Lianyu, Lai Mingyong, and artists such as Tan Dun, Zhang Jizhong, Leon Lai, and Lei Yizhen, were present at the ceremony.

== Collections ==
=== Li Zijian Oil Painting Exhibition Hall ===
The second and third floors of Area A of the Li Zijian Oil Painting Exhibition Hall house the oil paintings by Li Zijian, about 338 in total.

=== Chen Xichuan Sketch Exhibition Hall ===
The second floor of Area B of the Chen Xichuan Sketch Exhibition Hall include over 50 sketches by Chen Xichuan, who is a sketch painter and Li Zijian's first teacher.

=== Venerable Master Hsing Yun One-stroke Calligraphy Exhibition Hall ===
The third floor of Area B of the Venerable Master Hsing Yun One-stroke Calligraphy Exhibition Hall has Hsing Yun's calligraphies, which were donated by Li Zijian.

== Public Access ==
Li Zijian Art Museum open to visitors for free. It is closed on Mondays, and is open from 10:00 am to 17:30 pm daily.

== Surrounding area ==
- Xie Zilong Photography Museum
