= Yanghu ECO. Town station =

Metro station in Changsha, China

Yanghu ECO. Town station 洋湖新城站
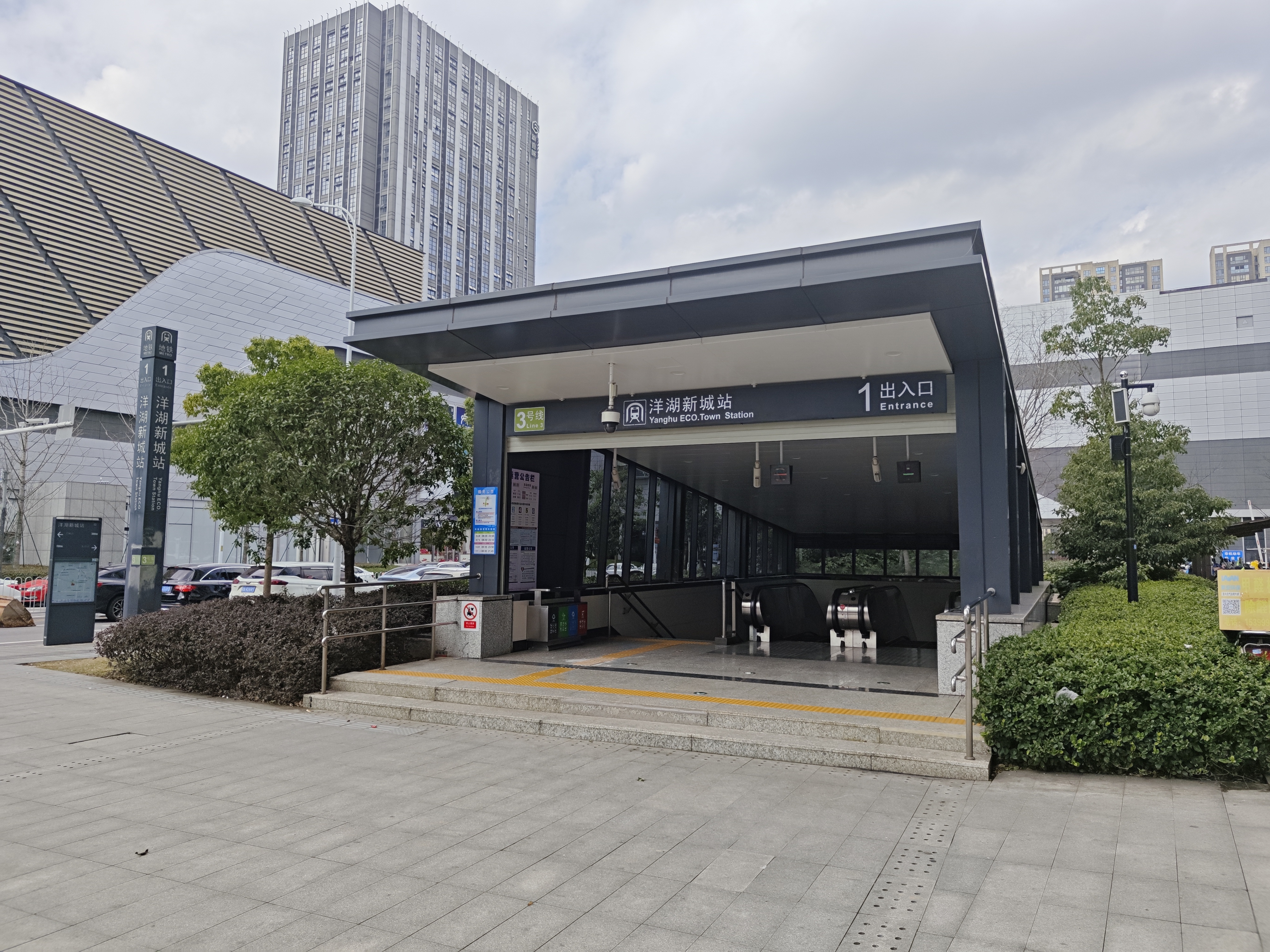
- Entrance 1

General information
- Location: Yuelu District, Changsha, Hunan; China
- Coordinates: 28°08′06″N 112°57′06″E
- Operated by: Changsha Metro
- Line: Line 3
- Platforms: 2 (1 island platform)

History
- Opened: 28 June 2020; 5 years ago

Services
Preceding station	Changsha Metro	Following station
Yanghu Wetland towards Xiangtan North Railway Station	Line 3	Yangguang towards Guangsheng
Location

Yanghu ECO. Town station (Chinese: 洋湖新城站; pinyin: Yánghú Xīnchéng Zhàn) is a subway station in Yuelu District, Changsha, Hunan, China, operated by the Changsha subway operator Changsha Metro. It entered revenue service on 28 June 2020.

== History ==
The station started the test operation on 30 December 2019. The station opened on 28 June 2020.

== Surrounding area ==
- Jin River
- Yanghu Wetland Park
