= Yanghu =

Yanghu 洋湖街道
- subdistrict
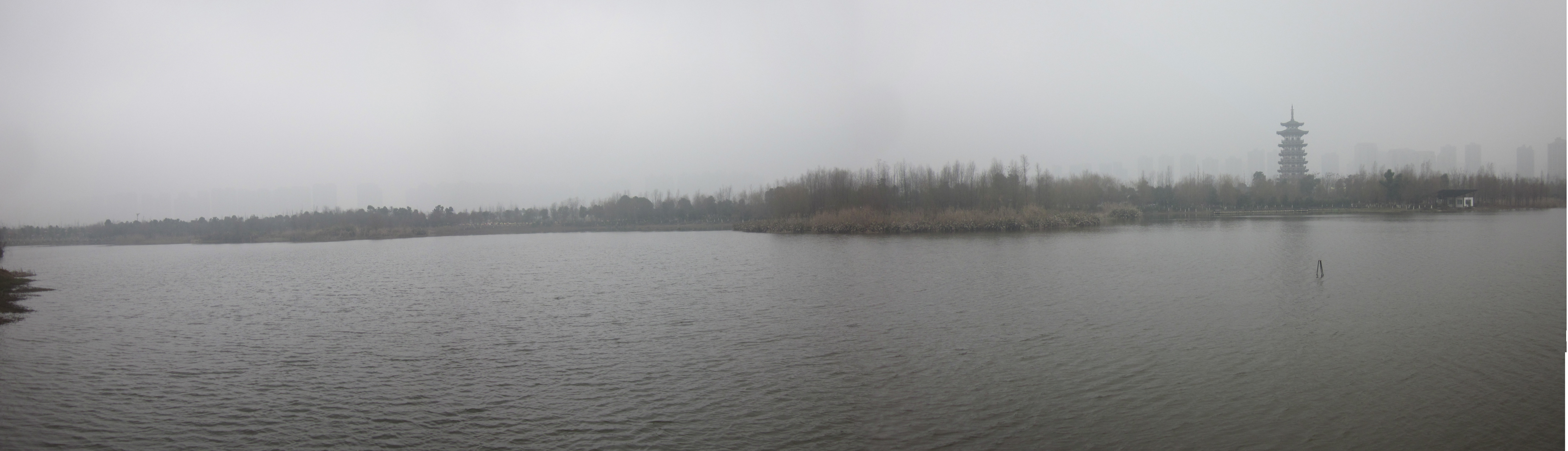
- Yanghu Wetland Park

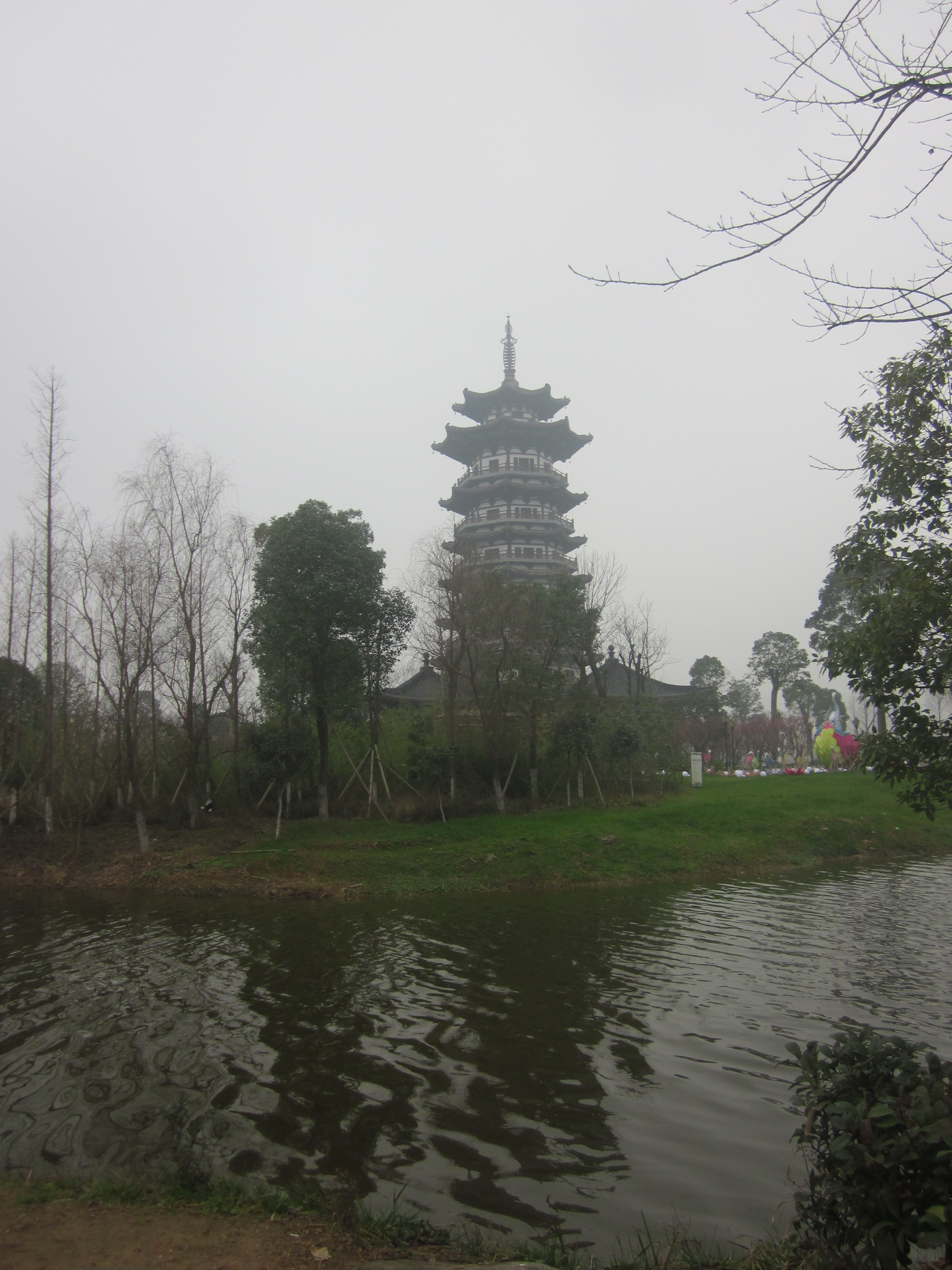

- Location within Hunan
- Coordinates: 28°06′00″N 112°55′35″E
- Country: People's Republic of China
- Province: Hunan
- City: Changsha
- District: Yuelu District

Area
  - Total: 23.88 km^{2} (9.22 sq mi)

Population (2015)
  - Total: 24,896
- Time zone: UTC+8 (China Standard)
- Area code: 0731
- Languages: Standard Chinese and Changsha dialect

Yanghu Subdistrict (Chinese: 洋湖街道; pinyin: Yánghú Jiēdào) is a subdistrict of Yuelu District in Changsha, Hunan, China. It is historically the territory of Yanghu Township (洋湖乡), Wangcheng County in 1951. The subdistrict covers an area of 23.88 square kilometres (9.22 sq mi) with a registered population of 24,896 (as of 2015). It has three villages and three communities under its jurisdiction.

== History ==
The subdistrict is named after Yanghuyuan or Yanghu Cofferdam (Chinese: 洋湖垸), which is the present-day Yanghu Wetland Park. The park is a wetland in the Jin River estuary area. Yanghu Wetland Park is an urban wetland park integrating ecological, cultural, recreational, and educational functions.Its ancient name was "Waguankou" (or "Waguan Estuary"; Chinese: 瓦官口). The Jin River is a first-level tributary of the Xiang River and it is named after the tomb of Jin Shang Chinese: 靳尚), a scholar-official of Chu State.

Yanghu Subdistrict was historically a part of Yanghu Township (Chinese: 洋湖乡) in 1951 and a part of Pingtang People's Commune (Chinese: 坪塘人民公社) of Wangcheng County (Chinese: 望城县) in 1958. In 1962, it was the territory of Pingtang Commune (Chinese: 坪塘公社) of Pingtang District (Chinese: 坪塘区) in Changsha County. Wangcheng County was re-established from Changsha County in 1978 and it was part of Wangcheng County, Pingtang Commune was reorganized as a township in 1984 and Pingtang Township (Chinese: 坪塘乡) was merged to Pingtang Town (Chinese: 坪塘镇) in 1985. On June 15, 2008, Pingtang Town was assigned to the jurisdiction of Yuelu District from Wangcheng County.

On August 3, 2012, the town of Pingtang was reorganized as Pingtang Subdistrict. On January 18, 2013, the subdistrict of Yanghu was established from four villages of Yanghu (Chinese: 洋湖村), Lianshan (Chinese: 连山村), Lantian (Chinese: 蓝天村) and Shantang (Chinese: 山塘村) and three communities of Pingtang (Chinese: 坪塘社区), Baimiaozi (Chinese: 白庙子社区) and Xinsheng (Chinese: 新生社区) of Pingtang Subdistrict.

== Subdivisions ==
When Yanghu Subdistrict was founded in 2013, it had four villages and three communities. As a new round of the Amalgamation of Village-level Divisions (Chinese: 村级合并) in 2016, Shantang Community was established by combining Shantang Village and Xiangping Community (formerly Pingtang Community). The subdistrict has three villages and three communities under its jurisdiction.

3 communities

- Baimiaozi Community (白庙子社区)
- Shantang Community (山塘社区)
- Xinsheng Community (新生社区)

3 villages

- Lantian Village (蓝天村)
- Lianshan Village (连山村)
- Yanghu Village (洋湖村)
