= Yanghu Wetland station =

Metro station in Changsha, China

Yanghu Wetland station 洋湖湿地站
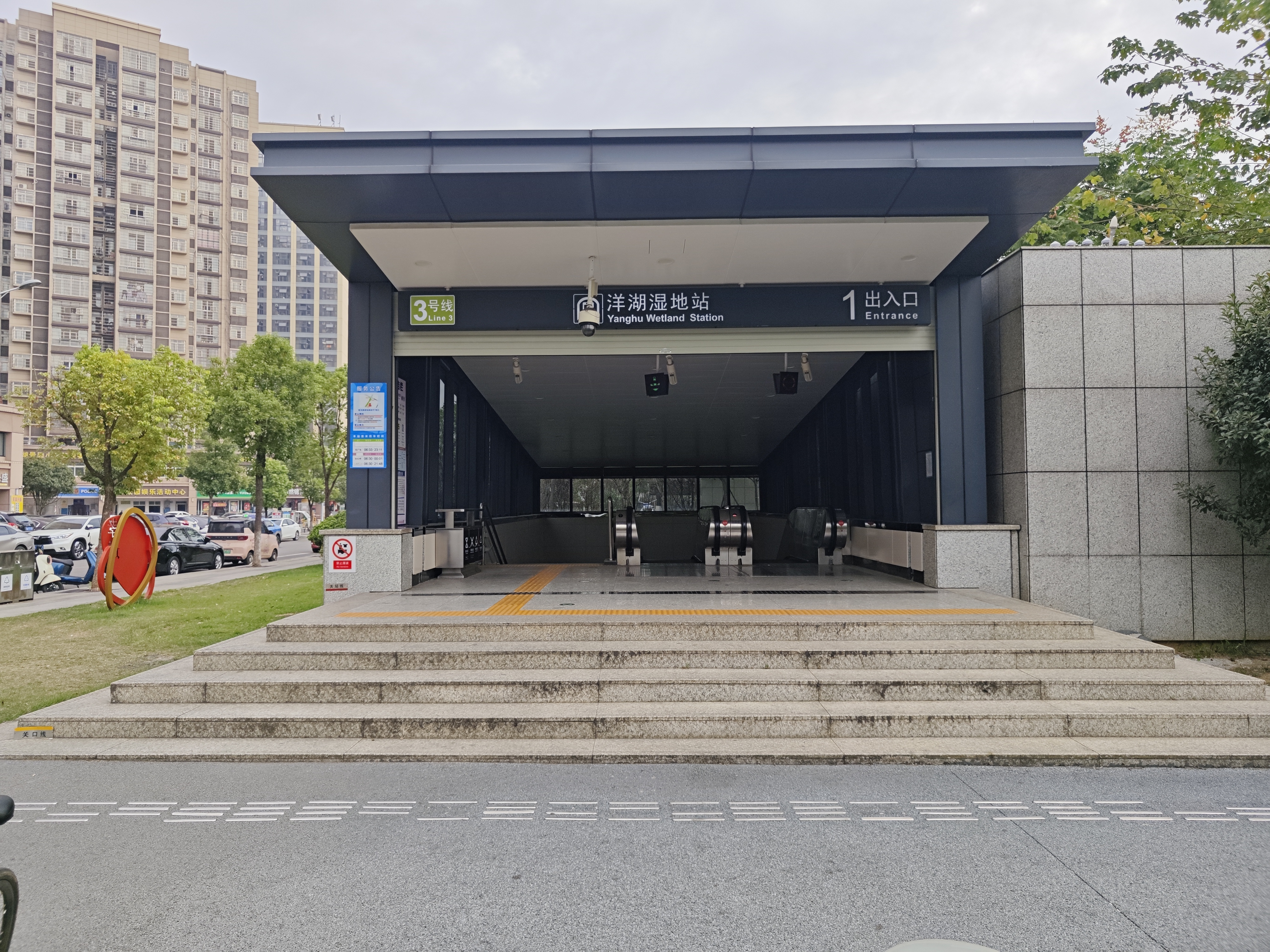
- Entrance 1

General information
- Location: Yuelu District, Changsha, Hunan; China
- Coordinates: 28°07′12″N 112°56′42″E
- Operated by: Changsha Metro
- Line(s): Line 3
- Platforms: 2 (1 island platform)

History
- Opened: 28 June 2020; 4 years ago

Services
| Preceding station | Changsha Metro | Following station |
|---|---|---|
| Shantang Terminus | Line 3 | Yanghu ECO. Town towards Guangsheng |

Yanghu Wetland station (Chinese: 洋湖湿地站; pinyin: Yánghú Shīdì Zhàn) is a subway station in Yuelu District, Changsha, Hunan, China, operated by the Changsha subway operator Changsha Metro. It entered revenue service on 28 June 2020.

== History ==
The station started the test operation on 30 December 2019. The station opened on 28 June 2020.

== Surrounding area ==
- Yanghu Wetland Park
