= Yanghu Wetland Park =

Park in Changsha, China

- 洋湖湿地公园
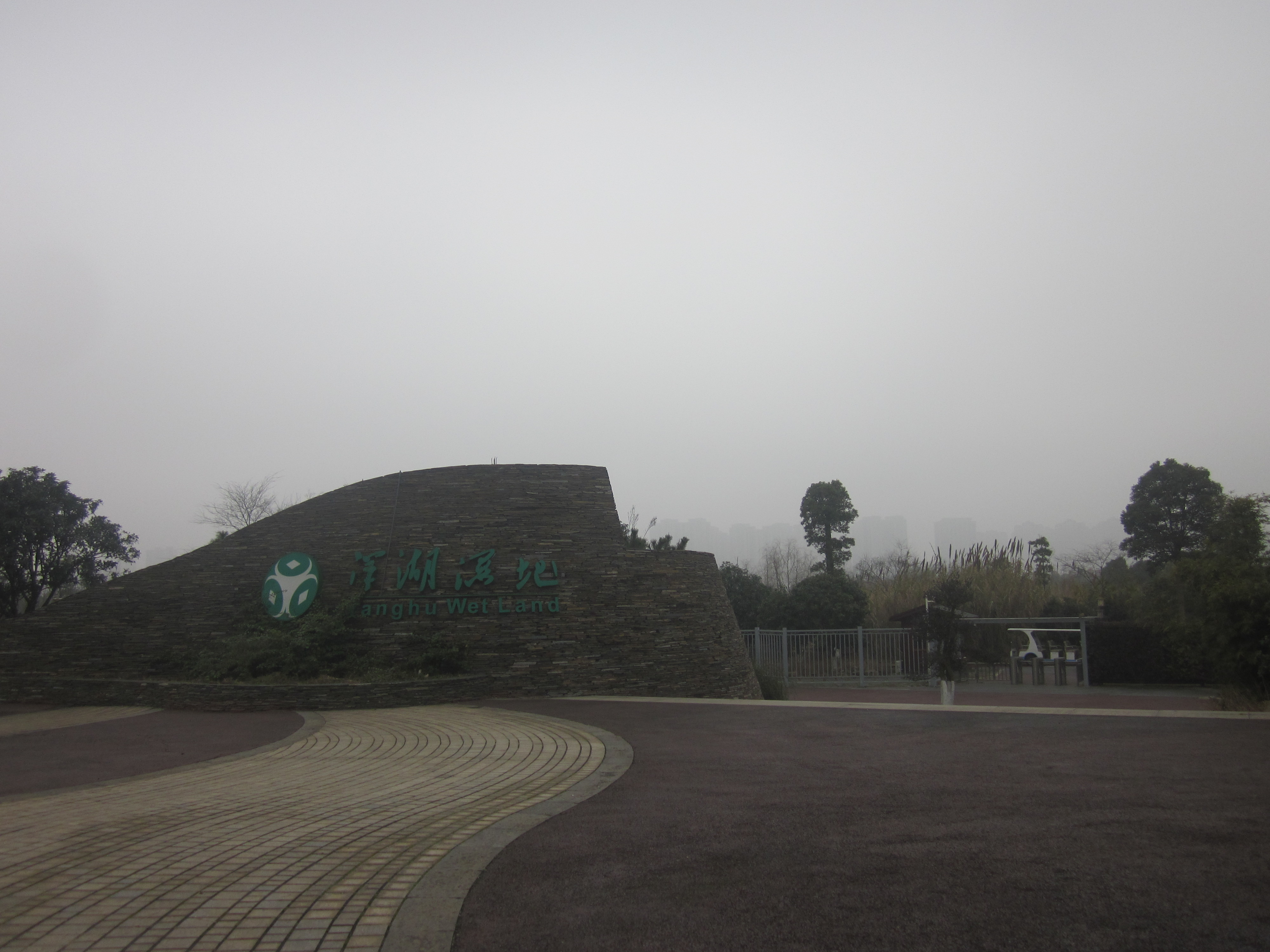
- Entrance of Yanghu Wetland Park

- Location within Hunan Location within China
- Type: Public park, urban park
- Location: Yuelu District, Changsha, Hunan, China
- Coordinates: 28°07′45″N 112°56′02″E
- Area: 0.53-square-kilometre (0.20 sq mi)
- Created: 2010
- Operator: Changsha government
- Visitors: 4 million
- Status: Open all year

Yanghu Wetland Park (simplified Chinese: 洋湖湿地公园; traditional Chinese: 洋湖濕地公園; pinyin: Yánghú Shīdì Gōngyuán) is a public wetland park in China, located at the western Changsha, Hunan. Covering an area of 0.53 square kilometres (0.20 sq mi), the park was established in 2010 and opened to the public in 2011. Located in the subdistrict of Yanghu, Yuelu District, Yanghu Wetland Park is bordered by Jin River on the South and east, South Xiaoxiang Avenue on the West, and Yanghu Avenue on the North.

== History ==
The wetland is the core zone of Yanghuyuan or Yanghu Cofferdam (Chinese: 洋湖垸) that its ancient name was "Waguankou" (or "Waguan Estuary"; Chinese: 瓦官口). Historically it was part of Yanghu Township (Chinese: 洋湖乡) in 1951 and a part of Pingtang People's Commune (Chinese: 坪塘人民公社) of Wangcheng County (Chinese: 望城县) in 1958. In 1962, it was the territory of Pingtang Commune (Chinese: 坪塘公社) of Pingtang District (Chinese: 坪塘区) in Changsha County. it was the territory of Wangcheng County when Wangcheng County was established in December 1977.and that of Yuelu District when Pingtang Town was assigned to the jurisdiction of Yuelu District from Wangcheng County on June 15, 2008.

Construction began in July 2010 and completed in 2014.

On November 8, 2013, it has been categorized as a 4A-level tourist site by the China National Tourism Administration.

== Geography ==
The wetland is located at the mouth of Jin River on the western bank of the Xiang River and the south of 2nd Ring Road in the southern part of Yuelu District. It is bounded on the north and west by the Jin River, south by Yanghu Road (Chinese: 洋湖路).

== Wildlife ==
The park is designated as a wildlife preserve. There are more than 700 plant species cultivated in the park, and some 130 species of bird to be seen in the park.

== Transportation ==
The park is accessible by metro at Yanghu Wetland station and Yanghu ECO. Town station.

== Gallery ==
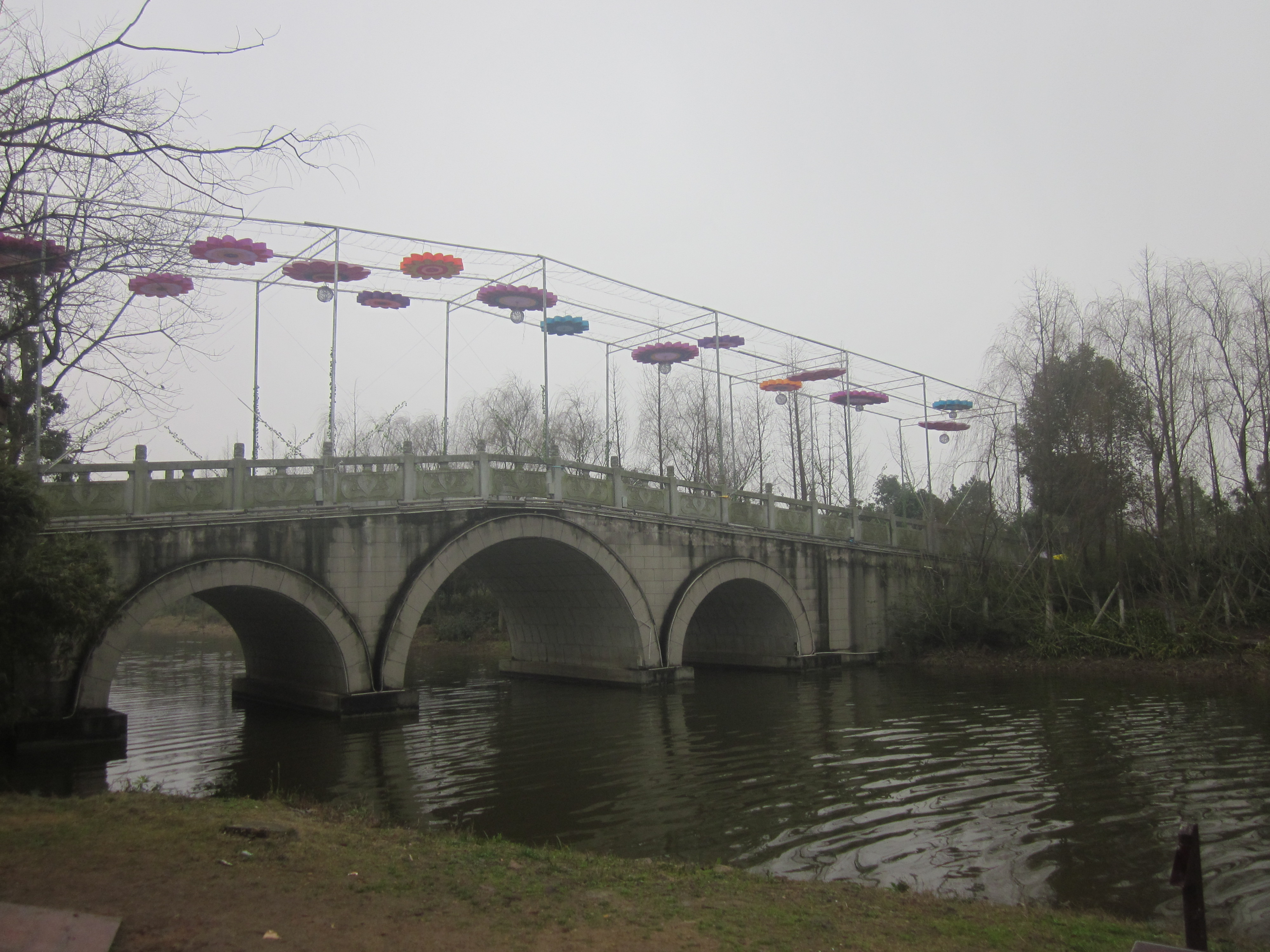
A three-arched bridge over Lake Yang in Yanghu Wetland Park

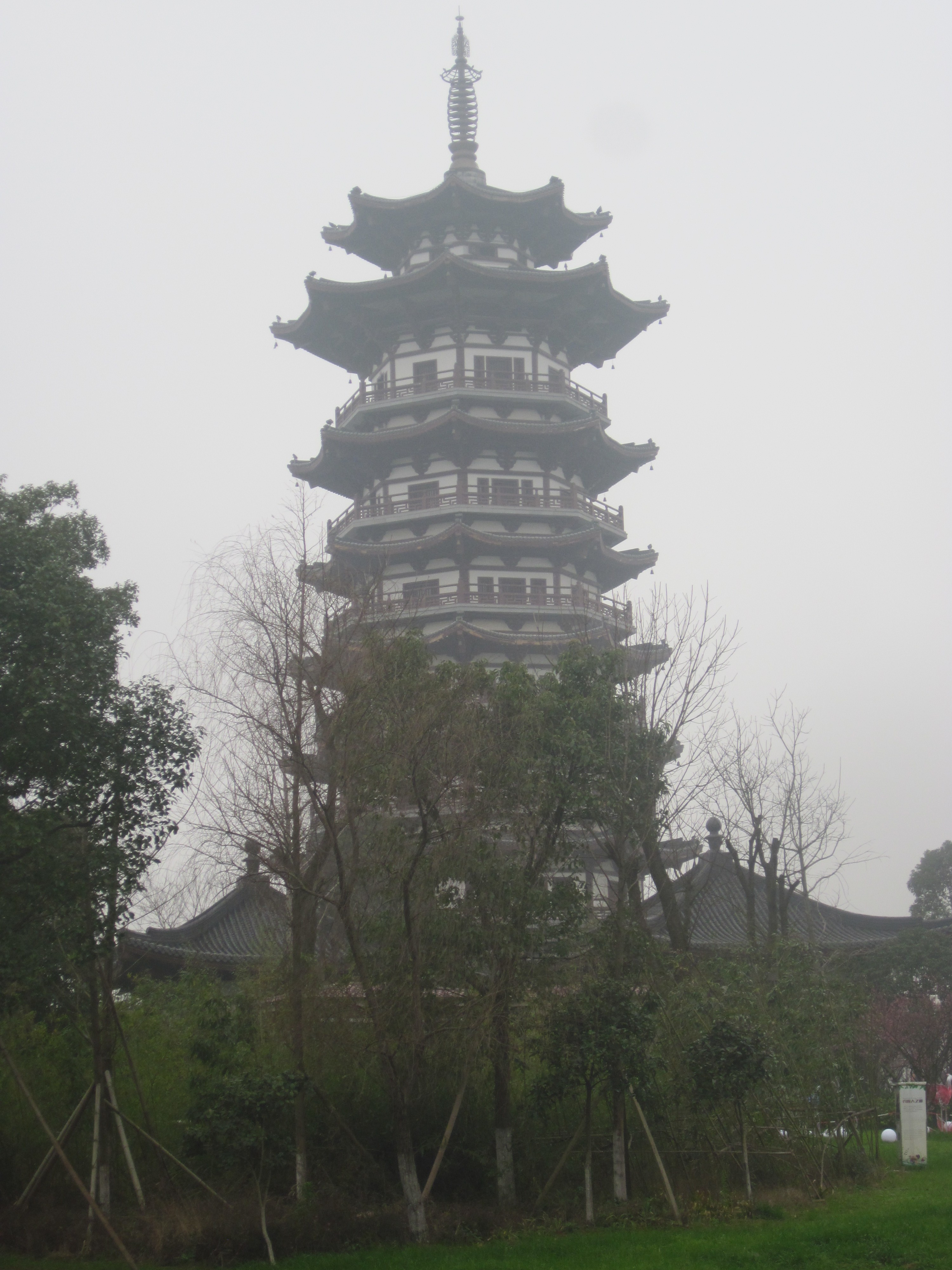
The Egret Tower in Yanghu Wetland Park

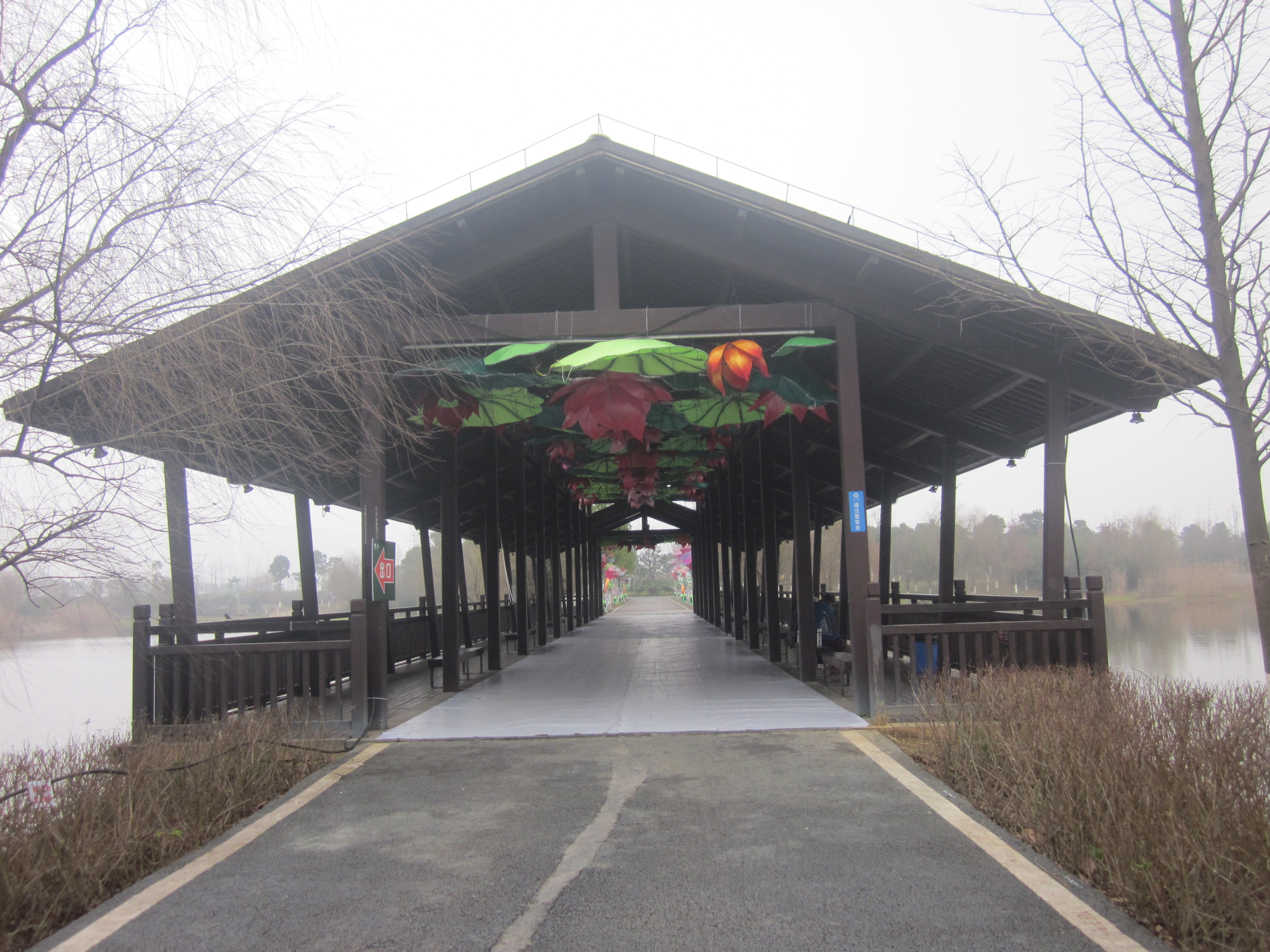
The Wind-rain Bridge in Yanghu Wetland Park

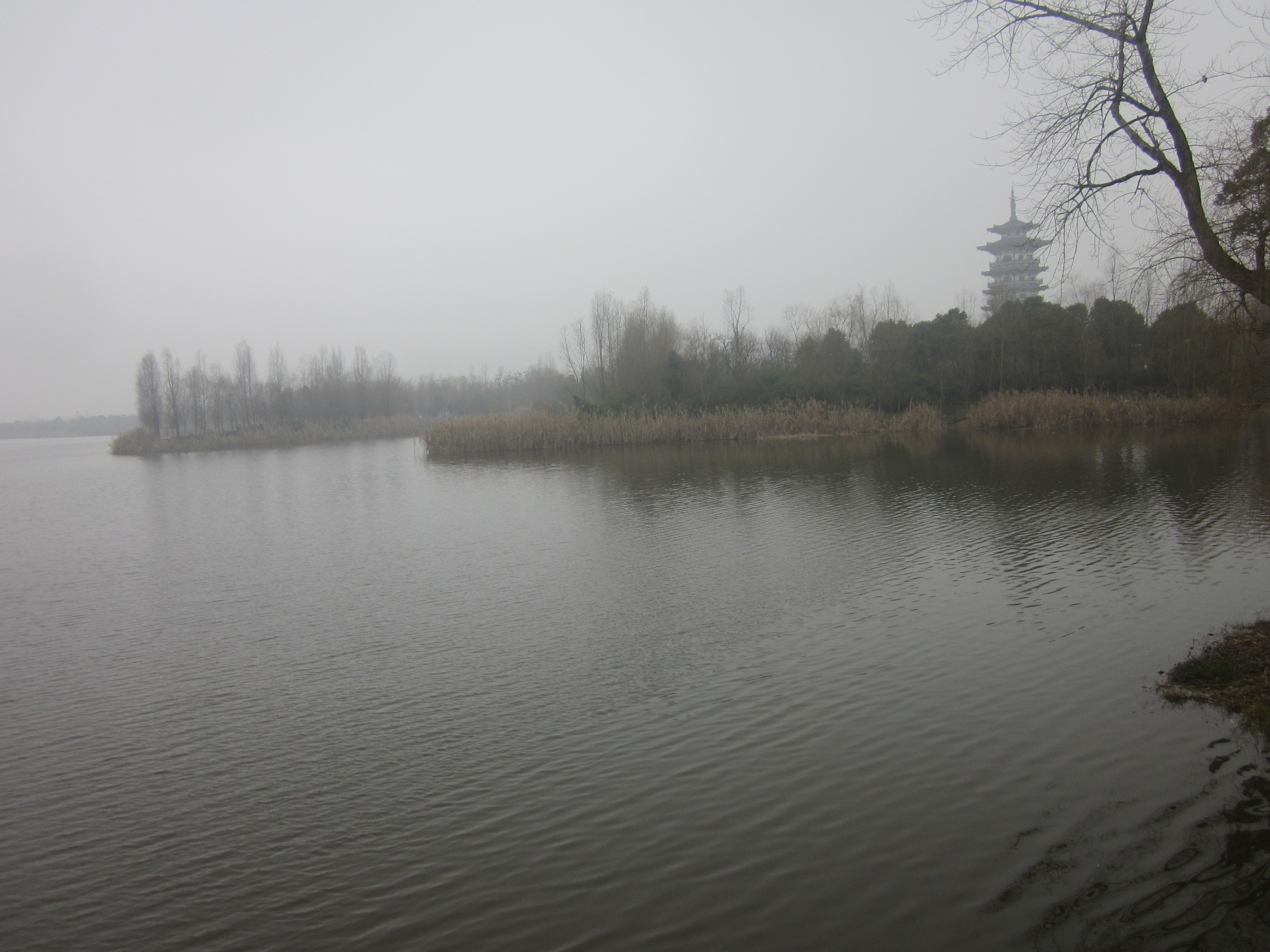
Lake Yang

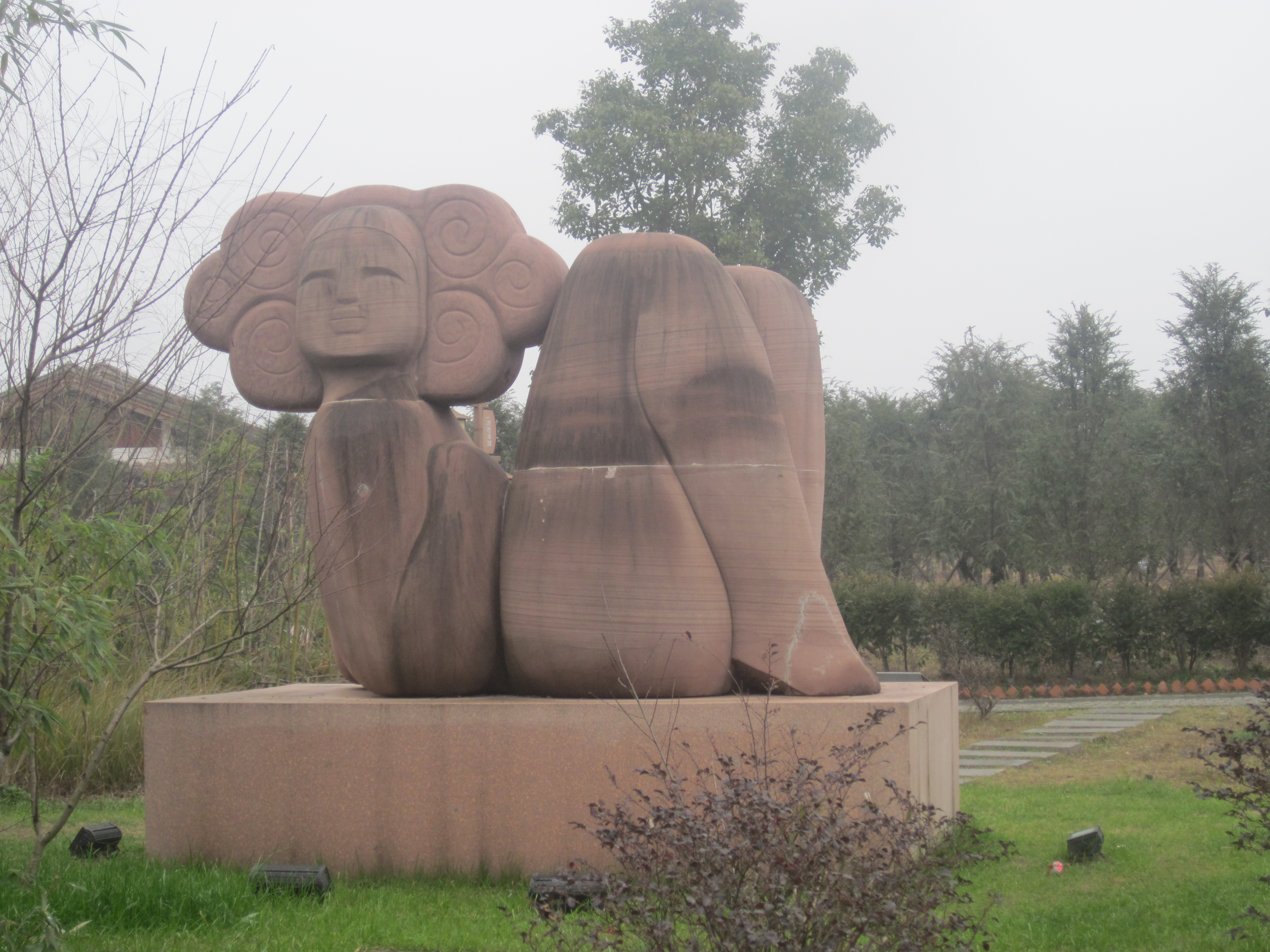
Cloud Twins by American sculptor Carol Turner in Yanghu Wetland Park

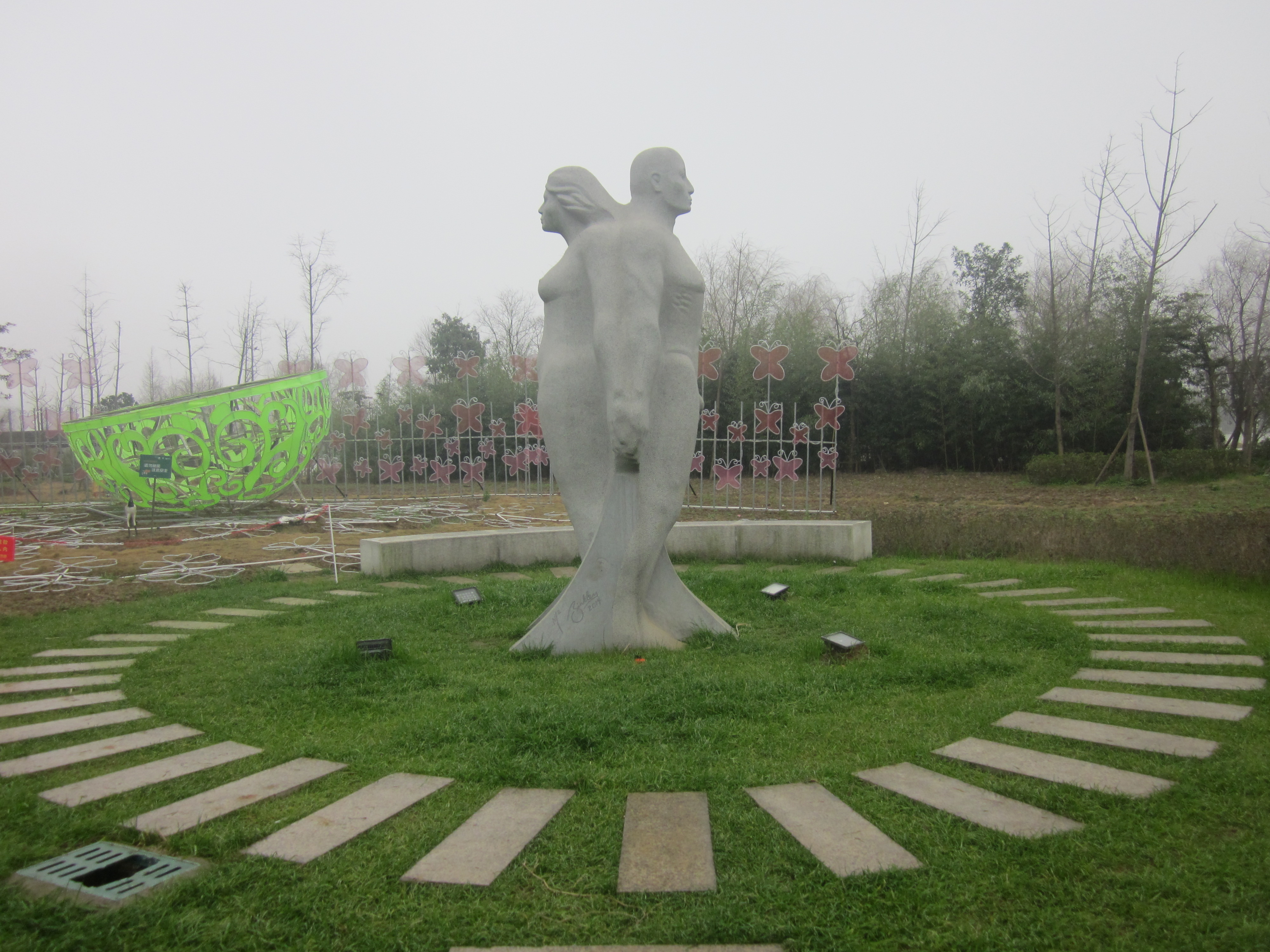
City Culture by Canadian sculptor Micheal Binkley in Yanghu Wetland Park
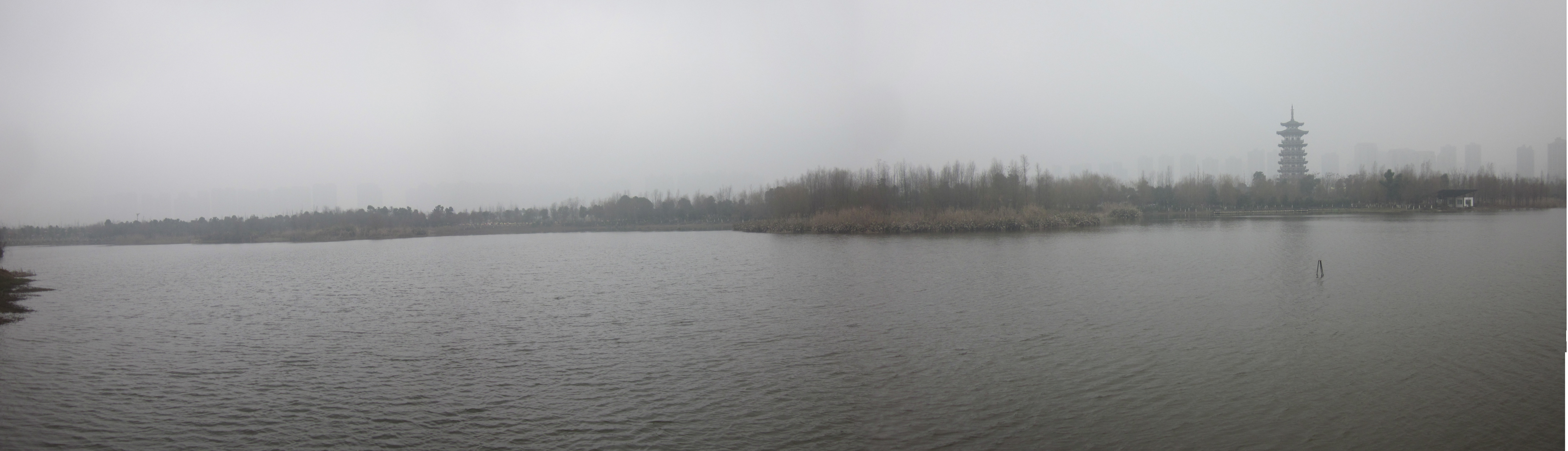
A panoramic view of Lake Yang in 2017
