= Jin River (Xiang River tributary) =

River in Ningxiang County, Changsha, China

Coordinates: 27°59′10″N 112°42′31″E

The Jin River is a left-bank tributary of the Xiang River located in Changsha, Hunan Province.

The Jin River is a minor river, approximately 65km in length. It drains a small section of eastern Hunan, between the Lianshui River and Wei River on the western side of the lower Xiang. It has 10 main tributaries, such as Huoshan (火扇), Shiban (石板), Shili (石立), and Lijiaba (李家坝). It passes through three towns, listed from upstream to downstream: Datunying Township, Daolin Town, and Yutan Town.

== See also ==
- Other Jin Rivers of China
- Rivers of China
