= Wangyuehu station =

Subway station in Changsha, Hunan, China

Wangyuehu station 望月湖
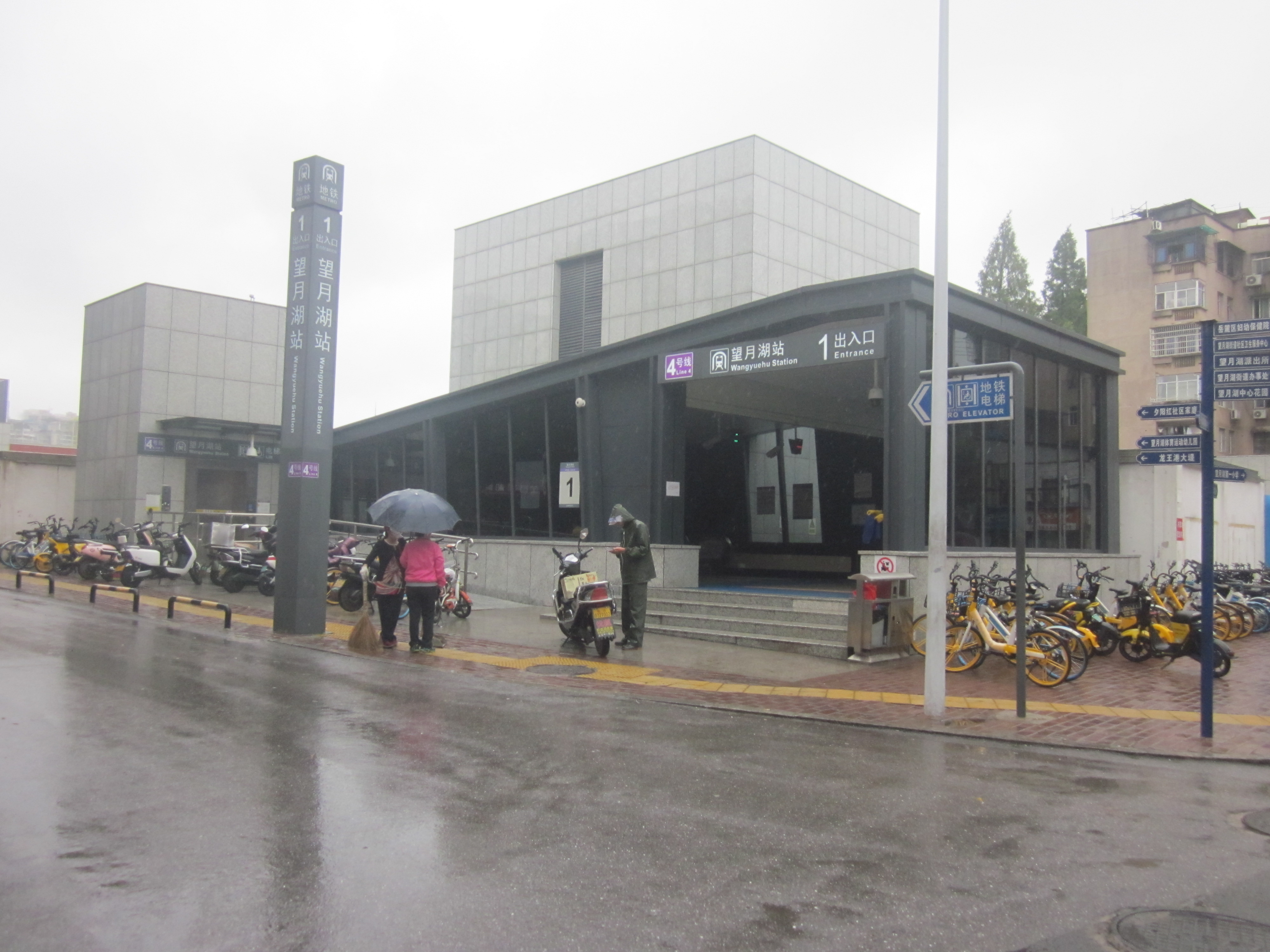
- No. 1 Entrance of Wangyuehu Station

General information
- Location: Yuelu District, Changsha, Hunan; China
- Coordinates: 28°12′43″N 112°57′44″E
- Operated by: Changsha Metro
- Line: Line 4
- Platforms: 1 island platform

History
- Opened: 26 May 2019

Services
Preceding station	Changsha Metro	Following station
Liugoulong towards Guanziling	Line 4	Yingwanzhen towards Dujiaping
Location

Wangyuehu station (Chinese: 望月湖站; pinyin: Wàngyuèhú Zhàn) is a subway station in Changsha, Hunan, China, operated by the Changsha subway operator Changsha Metro.

== Station layout ==
The station has one island platform.

== History ==
Construction began on December 31, 2014, and it was completed in June 2018. The station opened on 26 May 2019.

== Surrounding area ==
- Wangyuehu No. 1 School (望月湖第一小学)
- Meixi River (湄溪河)
- Wangyuehu village (望月湖小区)
