= Fubuhe station =

Subway station in Hunan, China

Fubuhe station 阜埠河站
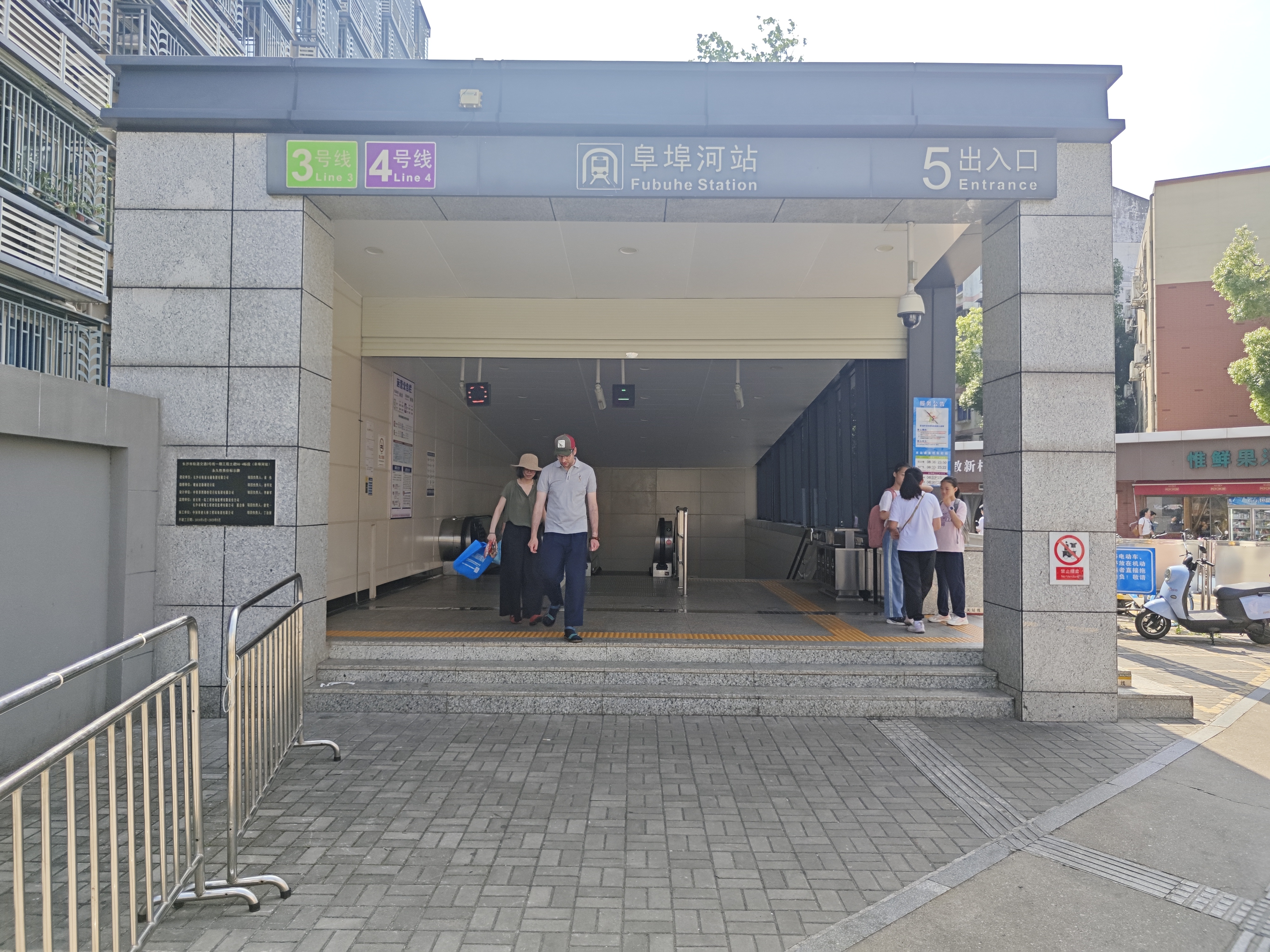
- Entrance 5

General information
- Location: Tianxin District, Changsha, Hunan; China
- Coordinates: 28°10′19″N 112°57′16″E
- Operated by: Changsha Metro
- Lines: Line 3 Line 4
- Platforms: 5 (2 island platforms, 1 side platform)

History
- Opened: 26 May 2019; 7 years ago

Services
Preceding station	Changsha Metro	Following station
Central South University towards Xiangtan North Railway Station	Line 3	Lingguandu towards Guangsheng
Hunan University towards Guanziling	Line 4	Bishahu towards Dujiaping
Location

Fubuhe station (Chinese: 阜埠河站; pinyin: Fùbùhé Zhàn) is a subway station in Changsha, Hunan, China, operated by the Changsha subway operator Changsha Metro. It is the largest subway station in Changsha.

== Station layout ==
The station has one side platform and two island platforms.

== History ==
Construction began in June 2015 and the station was completed in February 2019. The station opened on 26 May 2019.

== Surrounding area ==
- Central South University
- Xiangcai Kindergarten (湘才幼儿园)
- Dujiatang School (杜家塘小学)
- Yuenanlu School (岳南路小学)
- Changsha Tianma Hospital (长沙天马医院)
