= Huangtuling station =

Metro station in Changsha, China

Huangtuling Station 黄土岭站
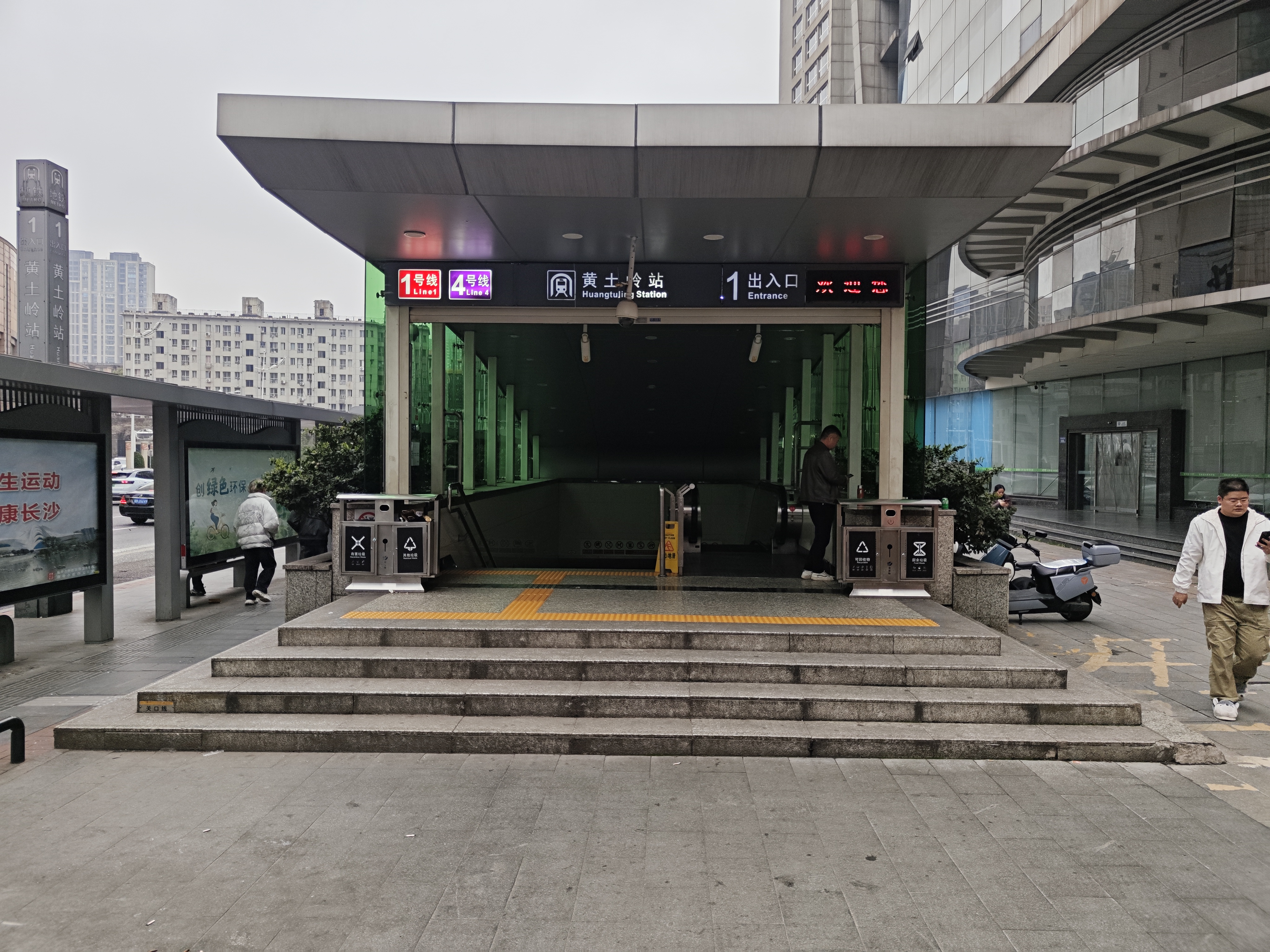
- Entrance No. 1 of Huangtuling Station.

General information
- Location: Tianxin District/ Yuhua District, Changsha, Hunan; China
- Coordinates: 28°09′57″N 112°59′32″E
- Operated by: Changsha Metro
- Lines: Line 1 Line 4
- Platforms: 5 (2 island platforms and 1 side platform)

History
- Opened: 28 June 2016; 9 years ago (Line 1); 26 May 2019; 6 years ago (Line 4)

Services
| Preceding station | Changsha Metro | Following station |
|---|---|---|
| Nanhu Road towards Jinpenqiu | Line 1 | Tujiachong towards Shangshuangtang |
| Bishahu towards Guanziling | Line 4 | Shazitang towards Dujiaping |
Location

Huangtuling station (simplified Chinese: 黄土岭站; traditional Chinese: 黃土嶺站; pinyin: Huángtǔlǐng Zhàn) is a subway station in Tianxin District/ Yuhua District, Changsha, Hunan, China, operated by the Changsha subway operator Changsha Metro. It entered revenue service on June 28, 2016.

== History ==
The station opened on 28 June 2016.

== Layout ==
| G | | Exits |
| LG1 | Concourse | Faregates, Station Agent |
| LG2 | Side platform, doors open on the right |
| LG2 | ← | Line 1 towards Jinpenqiu (Nanhu Road) |
| LG2 | | No regular service |
| LG2 | Island platform, doors open on the left |
| LG2 | | Line 1 towards Shangshuangtang (Tujiachong) | → |
| LG3 | ← | Line 4 towards Guanziling (Bishahu) |
| LG3 | Island platform, doors open on the left |
| LG3 | | Line 4 towards Dujiaping (Shazitang) | → |

== Surrounding area ==
- Entrance No. 2: Hunan Institute for Non-ferrous Metal Research
- Entrance No. 7: Changsha Song and Dance Theatre, Shennong Grand Hotel
