= Bishahu station =

Metro station in Changsha, China

Bishahu station 碧沙湖站
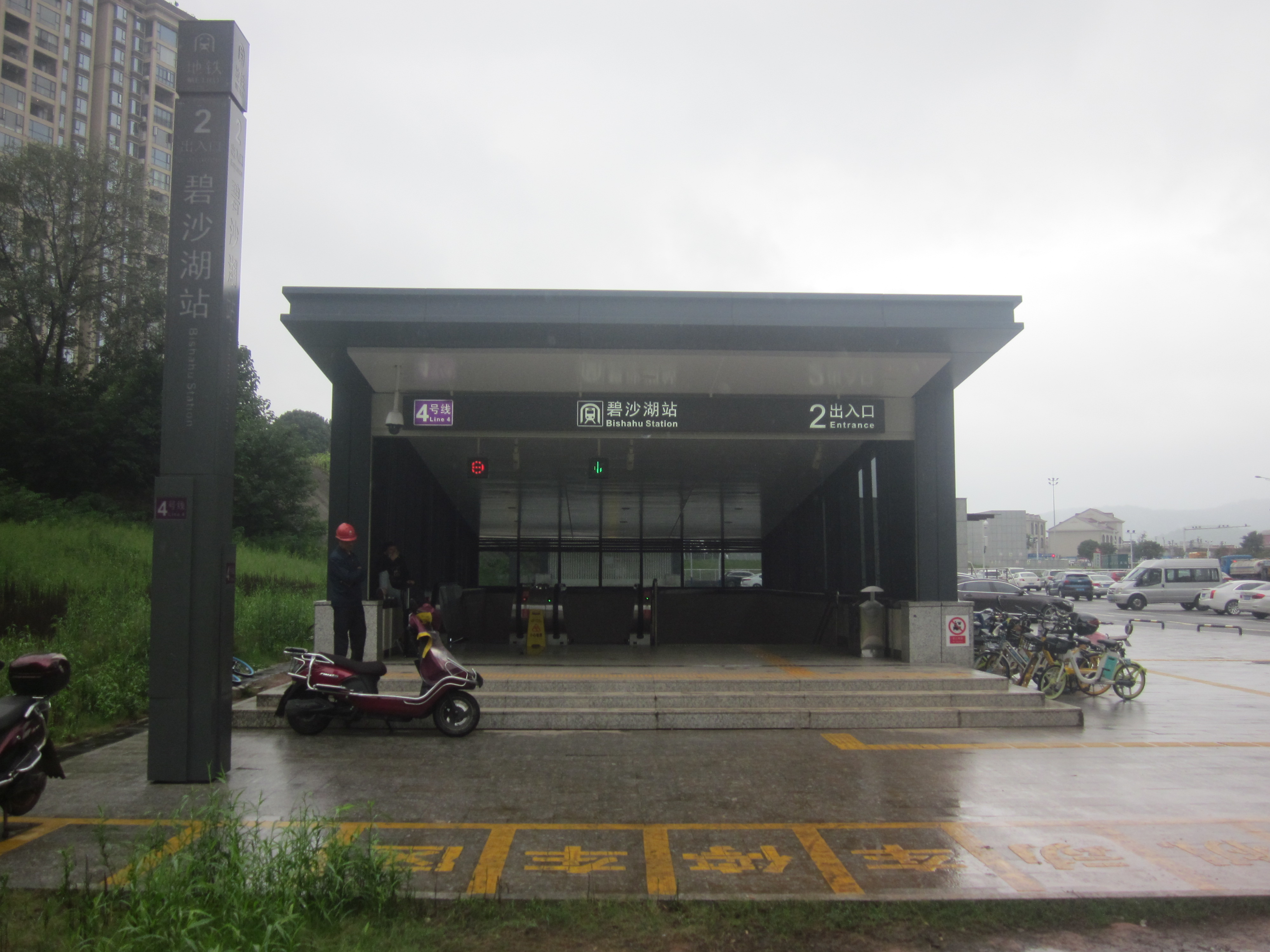
- No. 2 Entrance of Bishahu Station

General information
- Location: Tianxin District, Changsha, Hunan; China
- Coordinates: 28°10′13″N 112°58′29″E
- Operated by: Changsha Metro
- Line(s): Line 4
- Platforms: 1 island platform

History
- Opened: 26 May 2019

Services
| Preceding station | Changsha Metro | Following station |
|---|---|---|
| Fubuhe towards Guanziling | Line 4 | Huangtuling towards Dujiaping |
Location

Bishahu station (Chinese: 碧沙湖站; pinyin: Bìshāhú Zhàn) is a subway station in Changsha, Hunan, China, operated by the Changsha subway operator Changsha Metro.

== Station layout ==
The station has one island platform.

== History ==
The station opened on 26 May 2019.

== Surrounding area ==
- Tianxin District No. 1 High School (天心区第一中学)
- Poly International Plaza (保利国际广场)
