= Chazishan station =

Metro station in Changsha, China

Chazishan station 茶子山
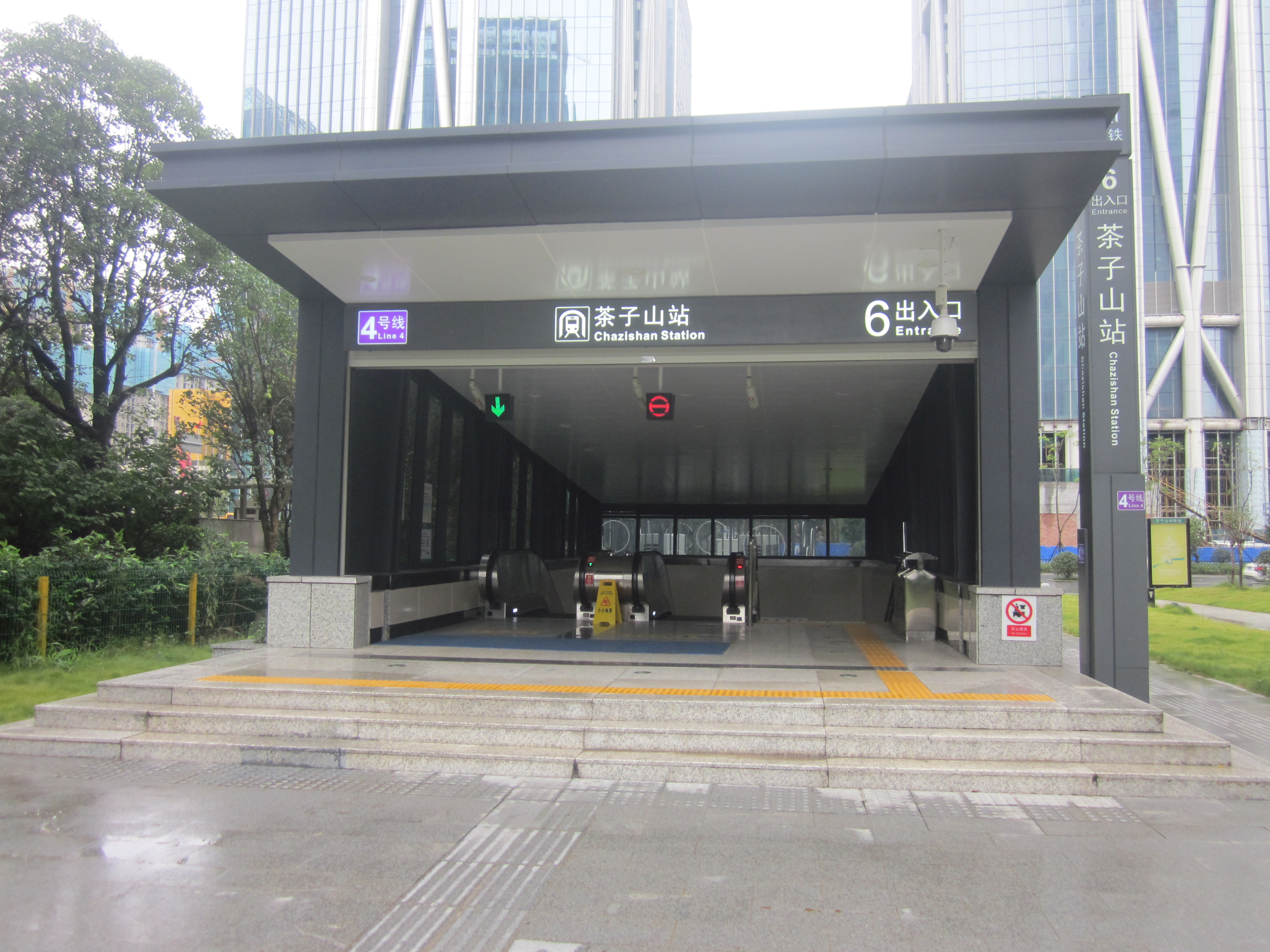
- No. 6 Entrance of Chazishan Station

General information
- Location: Yuelu District, Changsha, Hunan; China
- Coordinates: 28°14′54″N 112°57′58″E
- Operated by: Changsha Metro
- Line(s): Line 4
- Platforms: 1 island platform

History
- Opened: 26 May 2019

Services
Preceding station	Changsha Metro	Following station
West Fuyuan Bridge towards Guanziling	Line 4	Guanshaling towards Dujiaping
Location

Chazishan station (Chinese: 茶子山站; pinyin: Cházǐshān zhàn) is a subway station in Changsha, Hunan, China, operated by the Changsha subway operator Changsha Metro.

== Station layout ==
The station has one island platform.

== History ==
Construction began on July 13, 2015. The station opened on 26 May 2019.

It has been drafted as Financial Center station.

== Surrounding area ==
- Tanshan Park (坦山公园)
- Chashan Park (茶山公园)
- Hunan Financial Center
