= Xiangjiang New Town station =

Metro station in Changsha, China

Xiangjiang New Town station 湘江新城
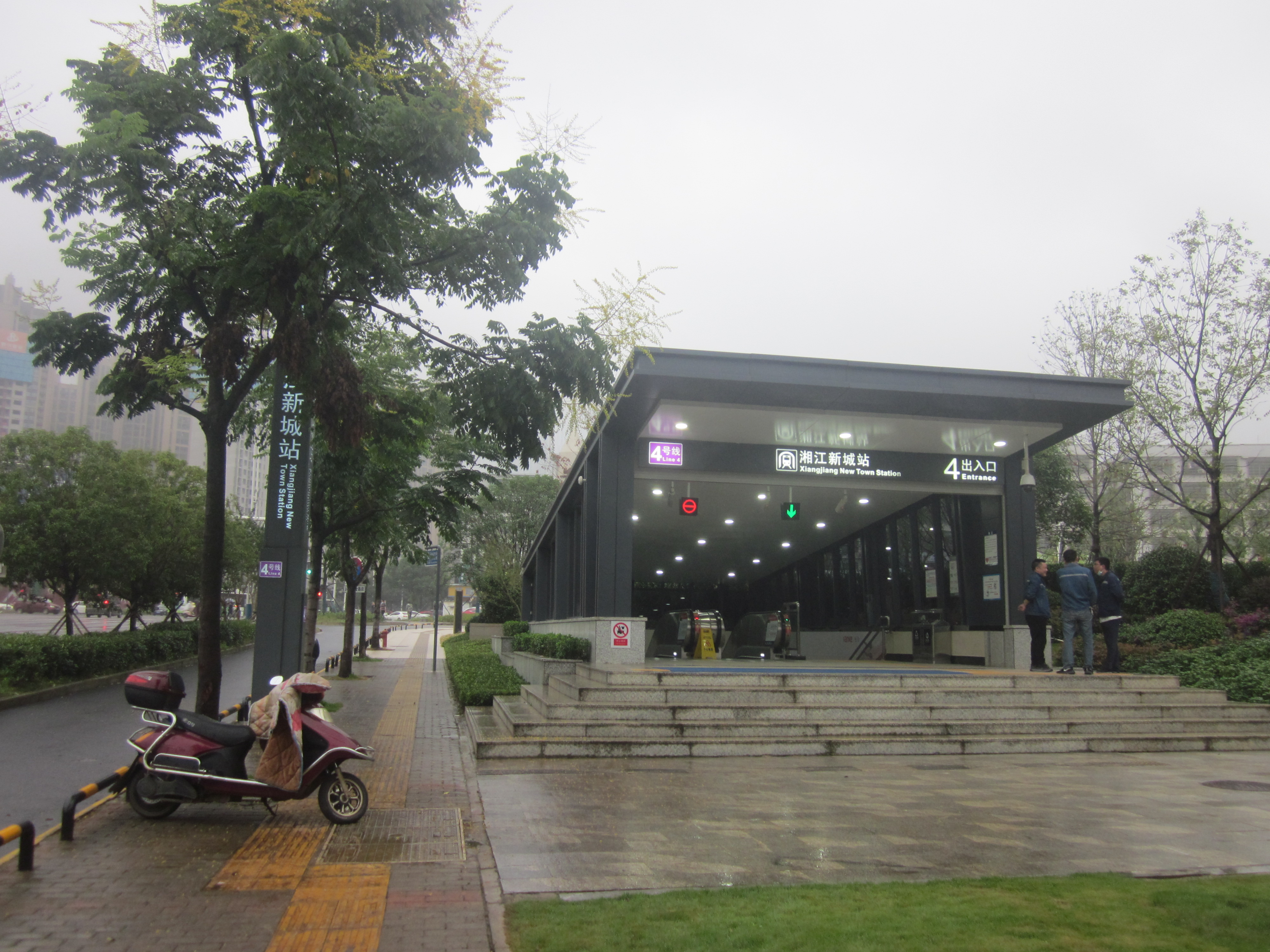
- No. 4 Entrance of Xiangjiang New Town Station

General information
- Location: Wangcheng District, Changsha, Hunan; China
- Coordinates: 28°17′06″N 112°55′42″E
- Operated by: Changsha Metro
- Line(s): Line 4
- Platforms: 1 island platform

History
- Opened: 26 May 2019

Services
Preceding station	Changsha Metro	Following station
West Yueliangdao towards Guanziling	Line 4	Hanwangling Park towards Dujiaping
Location

Xiangjiang New Town station (Chinese: 湘江新城站; pinyin: Xiāngjiāng Xīnchéng Zhàn) is a subway station in Changsha, Hunan, China, operated by the Changsha subway operator Changsha Metro.

== Station layout ==
The station has one island platform.

== History ==
Construction began on July 13, 2015. The station opened on 26 May 2019.

== Surrounding area ==
- High School Affiliated to Hunan Normal University
- The Moon Island (月亮岛)
- Baishihu Park (白石湖公园; 'White Stone Lake Park')
- Yinxingwan Park (银星湾公园; 'Silver Star Bay Park')
