= West Fuyuan Bridge station =

Metro station in Changsha, China

West Fuyuan Bridge station 福元大桥西
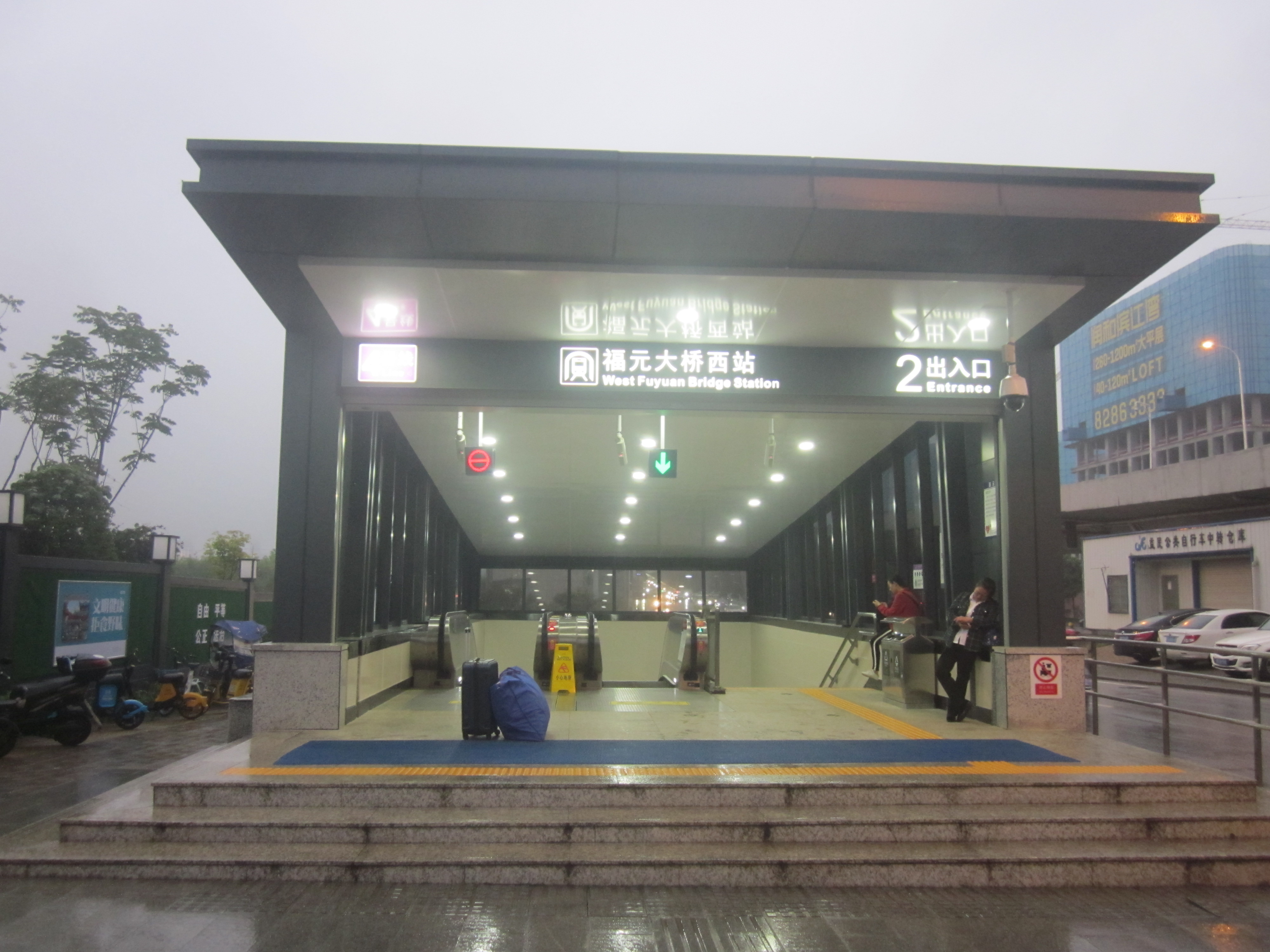
- No. 2 Entrance of West Fuyuan Bridge Station

General information
- Location: Yuelu District, Changsha, Hunan; China
- Coordinates: 28°15′33″N 112°57′55″E
- Operated by: Changsha Metro
- Line: Line 4
- Platforms: 1 island platform

History
- Opened: 26 May 2019

Services
Preceding station	Changsha Metro	Following station
Hanwangling Park towards Guanziling	Line 4	Chazishan towards Dujiaping
Location

West Fuyuan Bridge station (simplified Chinese: 福元大桥西站; traditional Chinese: 福元大橋西站; pinyin: Fúyuán Dàqiáo Xīzhàn) is a subway station in Changsha, Hunan, China, operated by the Changsha subway operator Changsha Metro.

== Station layout ==
The station has one island platform.

== History ==
Construction began on July 13, 2015. The station opened on 26 May 2019.

== Surrounding area ==
- Yue'ange Park (岳鞍阁公园; 'Yue'an Pavilion Park')
- Fuyuanlu Bridge (福元路大桥; 'Fuyuan Road Bridge')
