= Sutang station =

Metro station in Changsha, China

Sutang station 粟塘站
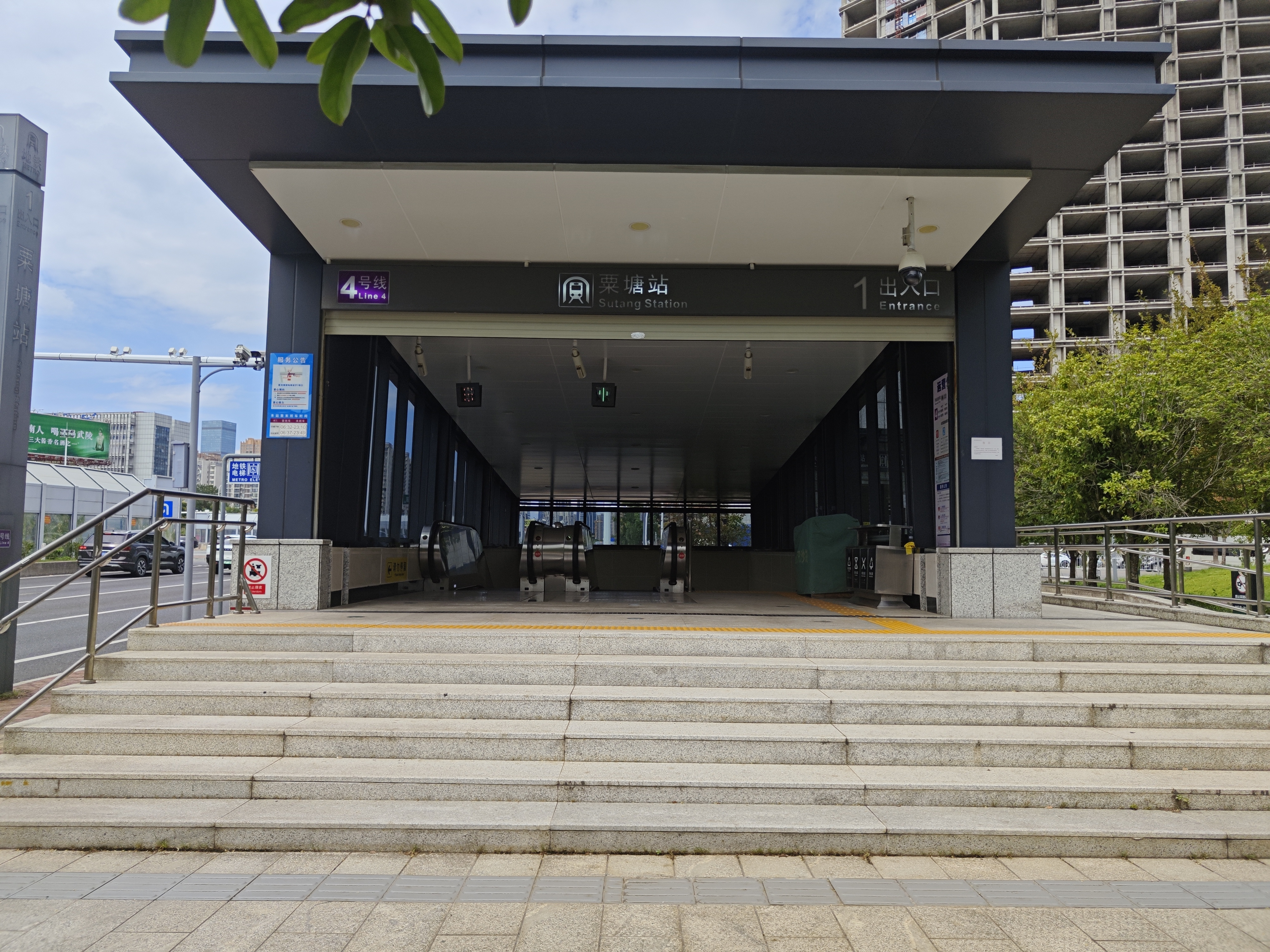
- No. 1 Entrance of Sutang Station

General information
- Location: Yuhua District, Changsha, Hunan; China
- Coordinates: 28°09′51″N 113°03′31″E
- Operated by: Changsha Metro
- Line: Line 4
- Platforms: 1 island platform

History
- Opened: 26 May 2019

Services
Preceding station	Changsha Metro	Following station
Shawan Park towards Guanziling	Line 4	Pingyang towards Dujiaping
Location

Sutang station (Chinese: 粟塘站; pinyin: Sùtáng Zhàn) is a subway station in Changsha, Hunan, China, operated by the Changsha subway operator Changsha Metro.

== Station layout ==
The station has one island platform.

== History ==
The station opened on 26 May 2019.

== Surrounding area ==
- Hunan Provincial Stadium
- Hengda International Plaza (恒大国际广场)
