= Shazitang station =

Metro station in Changsha, China

Shazitang station 砂子塘站
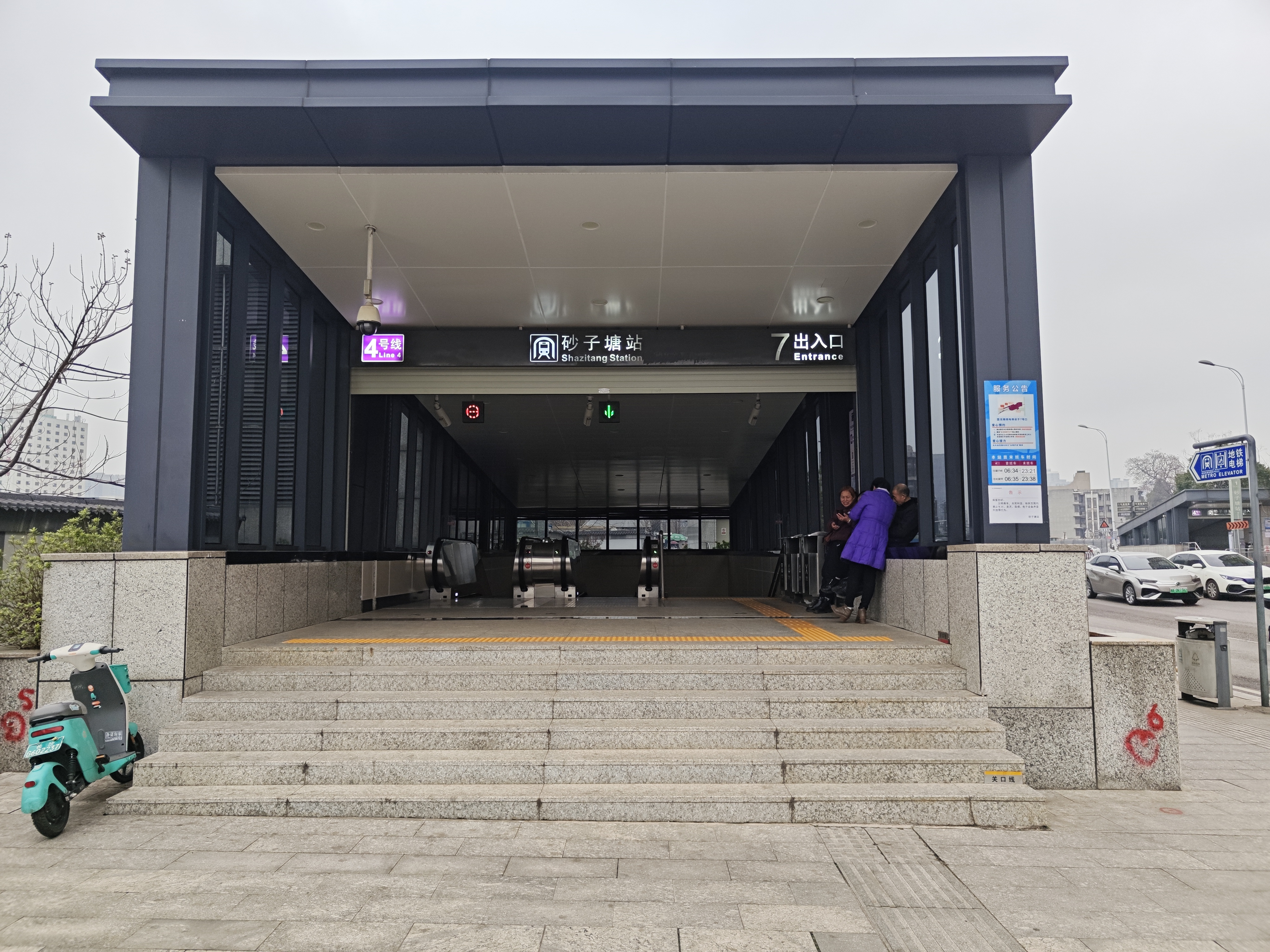
- No. 7 Entrance of Shazitang Station

General information
- Location: Yuhua District, Changsha, Hunan; China
- Coordinates: 28°10′05″N 113°00′00″E
- Operated by: Changsha Metro
- Line: Line 4
- Platforms: 1 island platform

History
- Opened: 26 May 2019

Services
Preceding station	Changsha Metro	Following station
Huangtuling towards Guanziling	Line 4	Chigangling towards Dujiaping
Location

Shazitang station (Chinese: 砂子塘站; pinyin: Shāzǐtáng Zhàn) is a subway station in Changsha, Hunan, China, operated by the Changsha subway operator Changsha Metro.

== Station layout ==
The station has one island platform.

== History ==
Construction began in March 2016 and the station was completed in October 2017. The station opened on 26 May 2019.

== Surrounding area ==
- First Affiliated Hospital of Hunan University of Traditional Chinese Medicine (湖南中医药大学第一附属医院)
- Changsha Opera and Dance Theatre
- Changsha Daotian Middle School (长沙市稻田中学)
- Shazitang School
