= Chigangling station =

Metro station in Changsha, China

Chigangling station 赤岗岭站
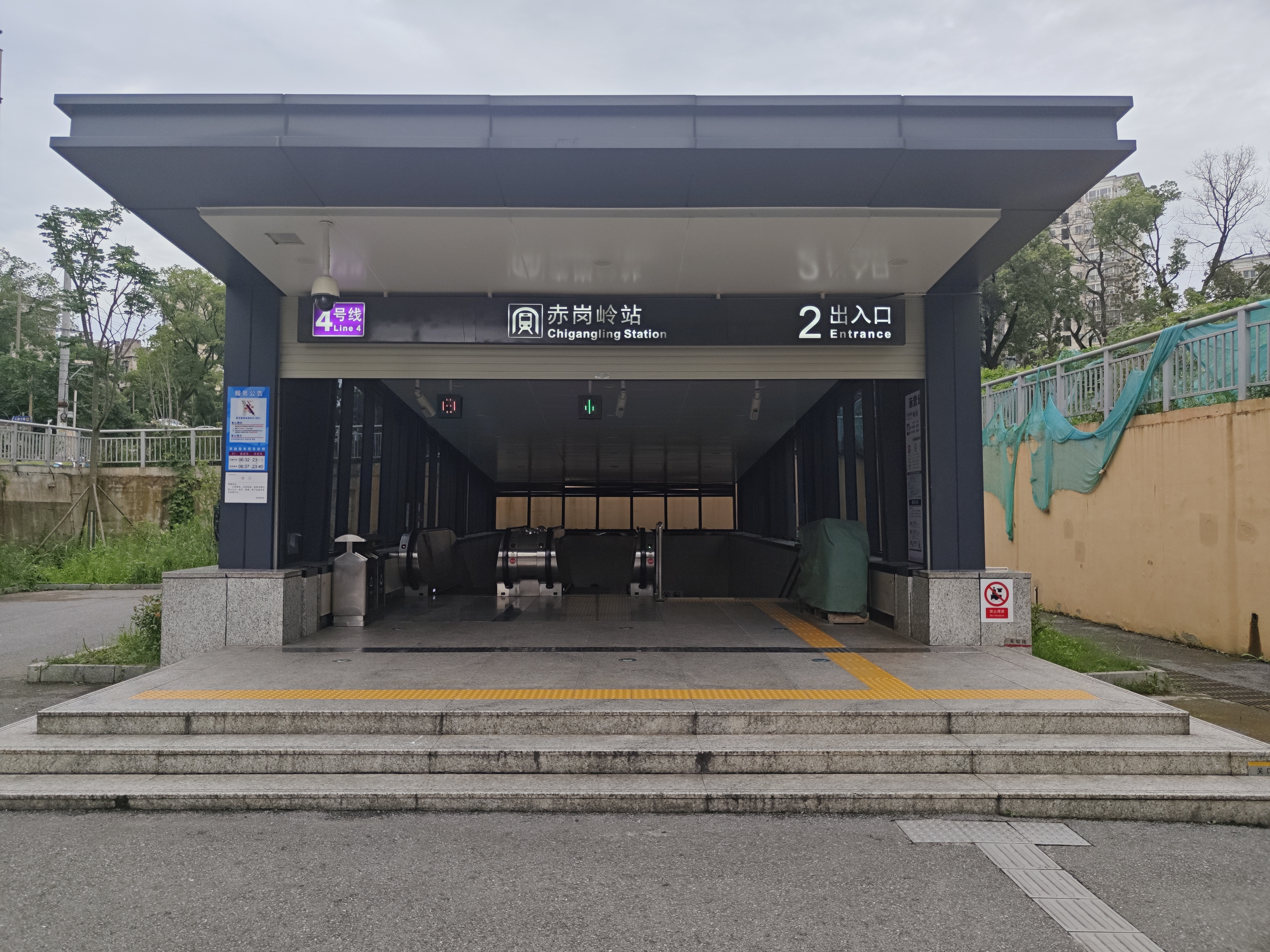
- No. 2 Entrance of Chigangling Station

General information
- Location: Yuhua District, Changsha, Hunan; China
- Coordinates: 28°09′57″N 113°00′42″E
- Operated by: Changsha Metro
- Line: Line 4
- Platforms: 1 island platform

History
- Opened: 26 May 2019

Services
Preceding station	Changsha Metro	Following station
Shazitang towards Guanziling	Line 4	Shumuling towards Dujiaping
Location

Chigangling station (simplified Chinese: 赤岗岭站; traditional Chinese: 赤崗嶺站; pinyin: Chìgǎnglǐng Zhàn) is a subway station in Changsha, Hunan, China, operated by the Changsha subway operator Changsha Metro.

== Station layout ==
The station has one island platform.

== History ==
The station opened on 26 May 2019.

== Surrounding area ==
- Changsha Cigarette Factory
