= Pingyang station =

Metro station in Changsha, China

Pingyang station 平阳站
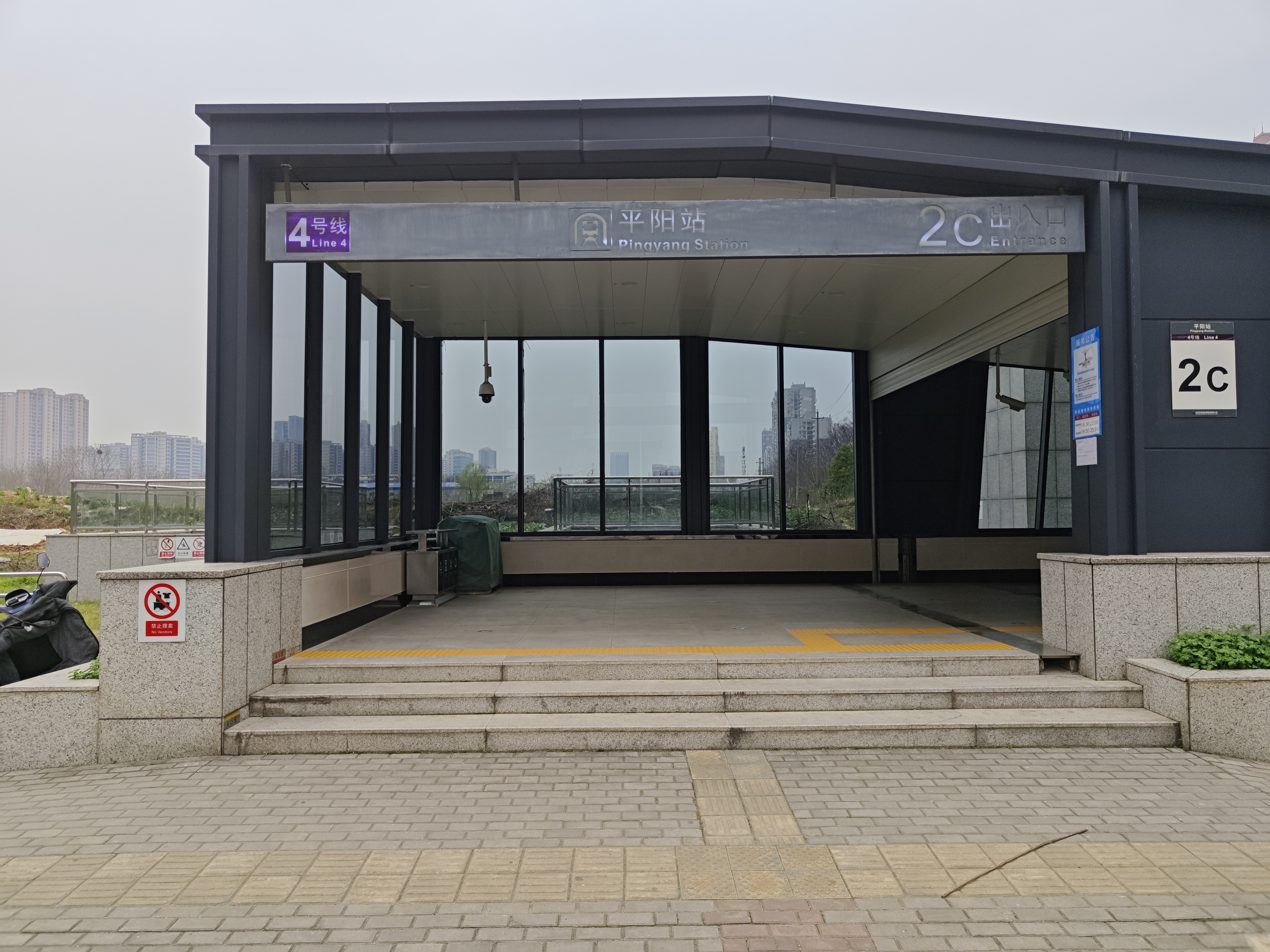
- No. 2C Entrance of Pingyang Station

General information
- Location: Yuhua District, Changsha, Hunan; China
- Coordinates: 28°09′07″N 113°03′18″E
- Operated by: Changsha Metro
- Line: Line 4
- Platforms: 1 island platform

History
- Opened: 26 May 2019

Services
Preceding station	Changsha Metro	Following station
Sutang towards Guanziling	Line 4	South Railway Station towards Dujiaping
Location

Pingyang station (Chinese: 平阳站; pinyin: Píngyáng Zhàn) is a subway station in Changsha, Hunan, China, operated by the Changsha subway operator Changsha Metro.

== Layout ==
Pingyang has one island platform.

== History ==
The station opened on 26 May 2019.

== Surrounding area ==
- Hengda International Plaza (恒大国际广场)
- Lituo School (黎托小学)
