= Hanwangling Park station =

Metro station in Changsha, China

Hanwangling Park station 汉王陵公园
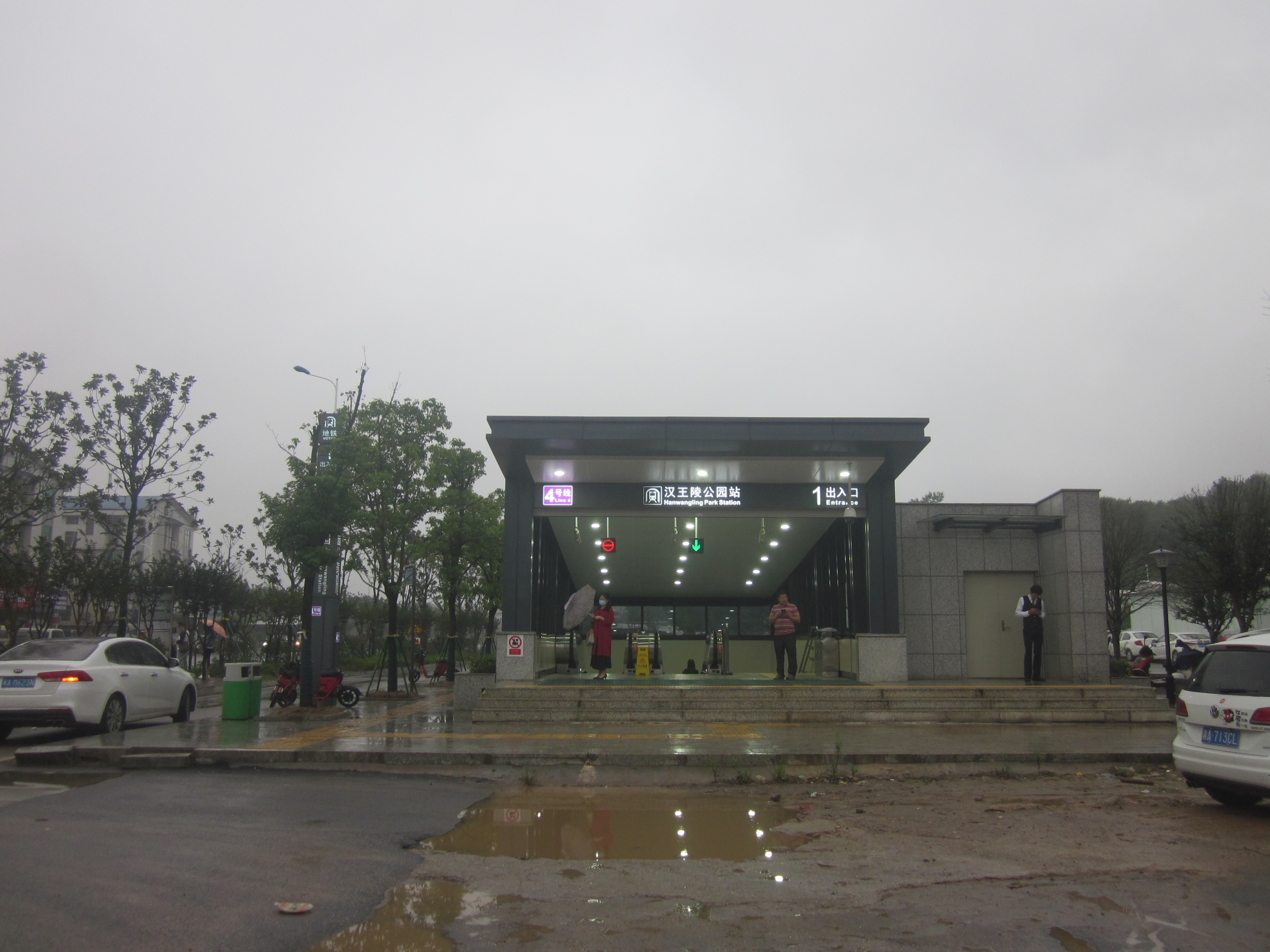
- No. 1 Entrance of Hanwangling Park Station

General information
- Location: Wangcheng District, Changsha, Hunan; China
- Coordinates: 28°16′17″N 112°56′30″E
- Operated by: Changsha Metro
- Line: Line 4
- Platforms: 1 island platform

History
- Opened: 26 May 2019

Services
Preceding station	Changsha Metro	Following station
Xiangjiang New Town towards Guanziling	Line 4	West Fuyuan Bridge towards Dujiaping
Location

Hanwangling Park station (simplified Chinese: 汉王陵公园站; traditional Chinese: 漢王陵公園站; pinyin: Hànwānglíng Gōngyuán Zhàn) is a subway station in Changsha, Hunan, China, operated by the Changsha subway operator Changsha Metro.

== Station layout ==
The station has one island platform.

== History ==
Construction began on July 13, 2015. The station opened on 26 May 2019.

== Surrounding area ==
- South Village School (南村小学)
- Archaeological Site Park of the Han Dynasty King's Mausoleum in Changsha (汉长沙国王陵考古遗址公园)
