= Changsha South railway station =

Railway station in Changsha, China

Coordinates: 28°09′01″N 113°03′32″E

Changshanan 长沙南
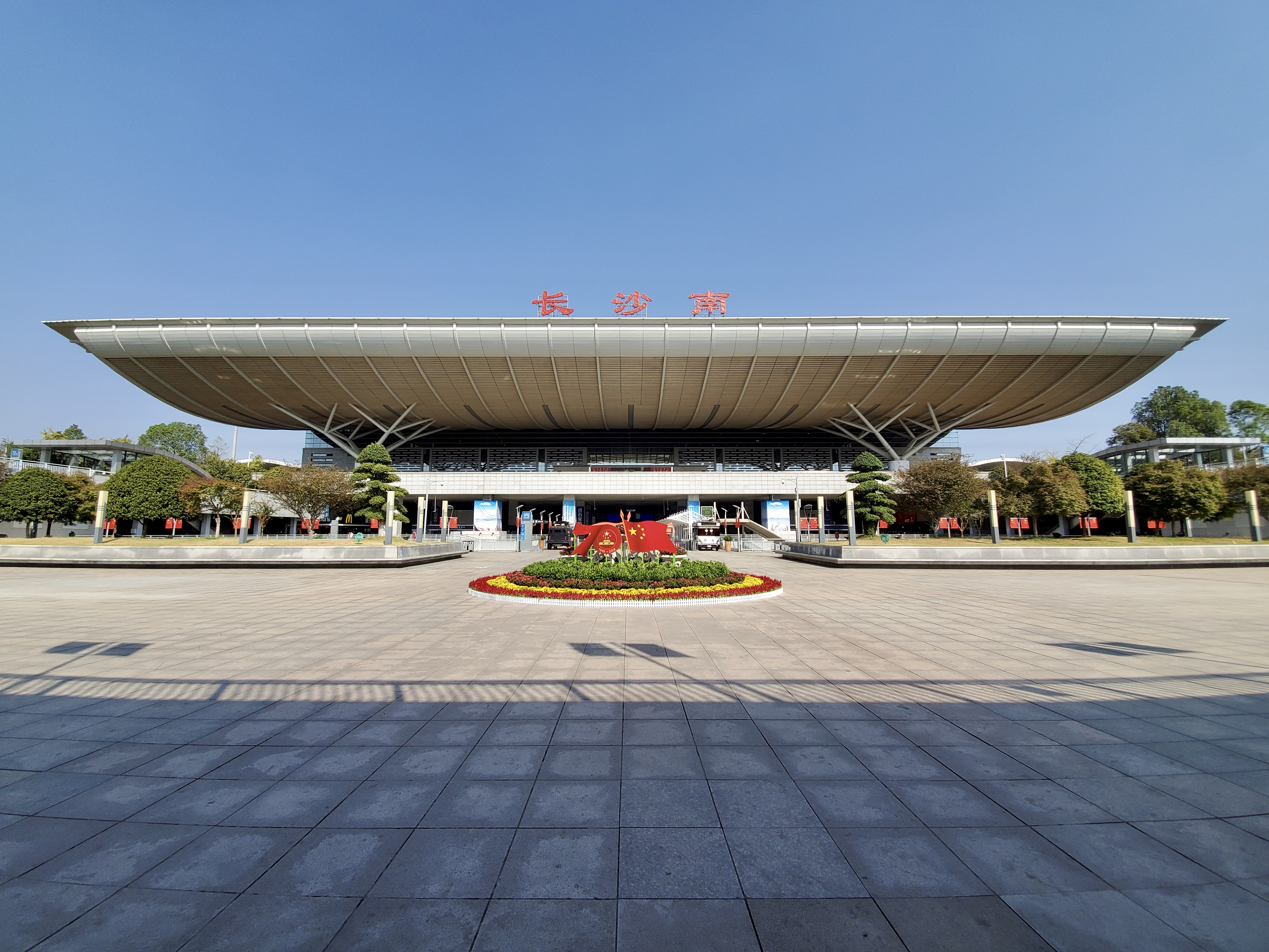
- Changsha South railway station

General information
- Other names: Changsha South
- Location: Yuhua District, Changsha, Hunan; China
- Operator: CR Guangzhou; Changsha Metro; Changsha Maglev Express

Other information
- Station code: TMIS code: 65818; Telegraph code: CWQ; Pinyin code: CSN
- Classification: Top Class station

History
- Opened: 26 December 2009; 29 April 2014; 6 May 2016
Location

Changsha South railway station (simplified Chinese: 长沙南站; traditional Chinese: 長沙南站; pinyin: Chángshānán zhàn) is a metro station and a railway station of Wuguang Passenger Railway and Hukun Passenger Railway. The station is located in Lituo Subdistrict, Yuhua District, Changsha, Hunan, China. It is a hub and the connecting point of Beijing–Guangzhou high-speed railway, Shanghai–Kunming high-speed railway and the Changsha–Ganzhou high-speed railway of the Xiamen–Chongqing corridor, under construction. The station was opened on 26 December 2009.

The Changsa South Railway Station is a transportation center of high-speed railways, metro lines 2 and 4, maglev, as well as buses and coaches, which seamlessly connect downtown, Changsha Huanghua Airport and nearby cities.

== Design ==
The designer of the station building is from the 3rd department of Central South Architectural Design Institute, INC. The roof features the waves and ripples of water. It has a total construction area of 273,000 square meters and the depot area is 137,000 square meters.

== History ==
The station opened on 26 December 2009.

When the station was first open, the surrounded area—which is away from Changsha's city center—was mostly industrial. Since then, however, high-rise residential and office development has taken place around the station. The passenger volume has also increased greatly.

== Gallery ==
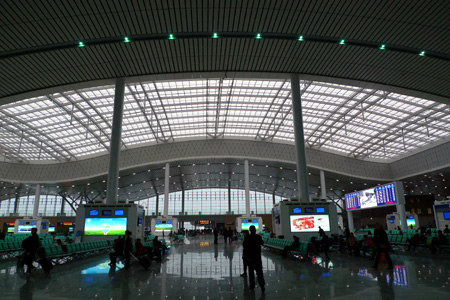
Inside the waiting hall of Changsha South railway station

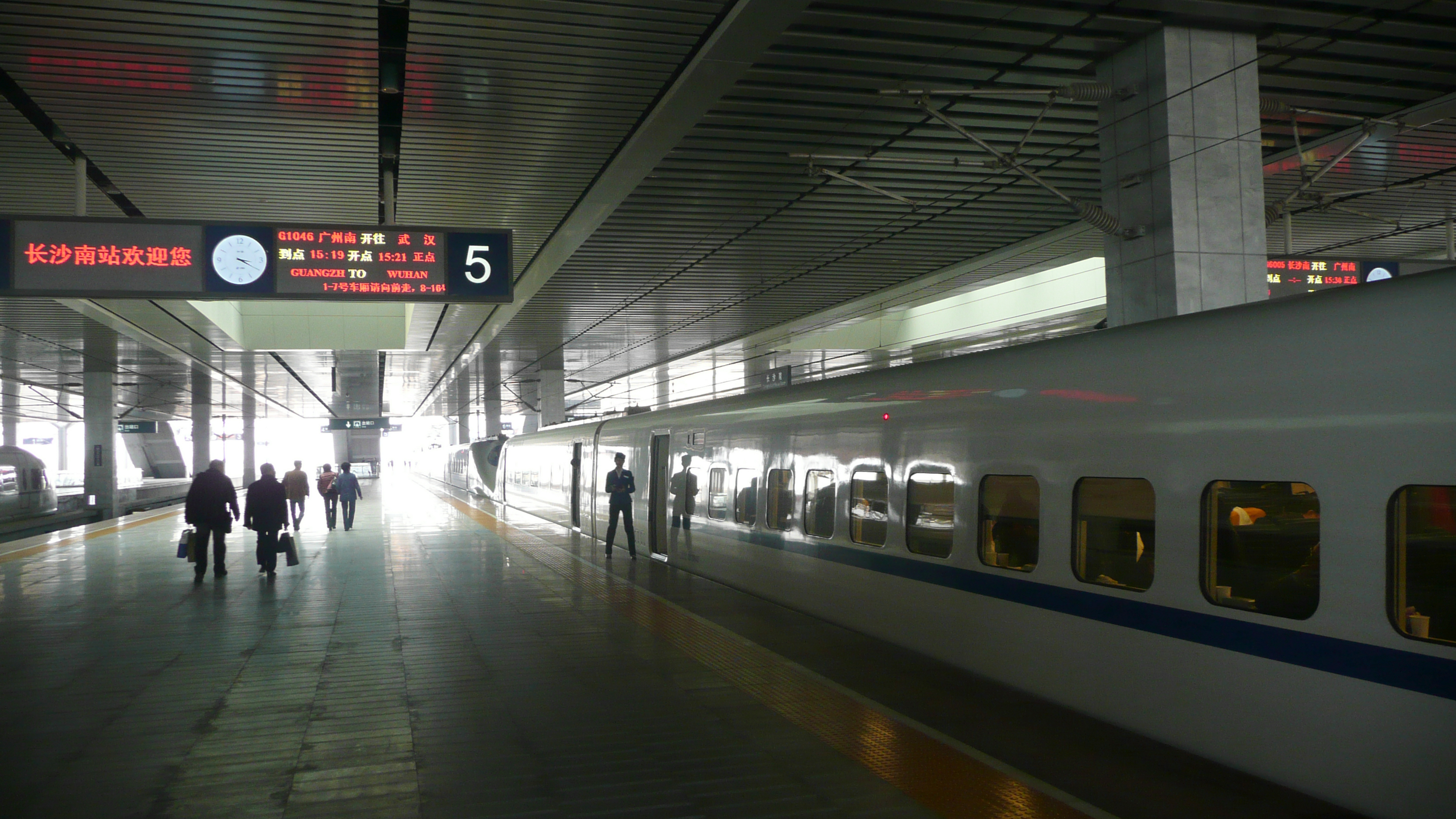
Platform view of a CRH2 train

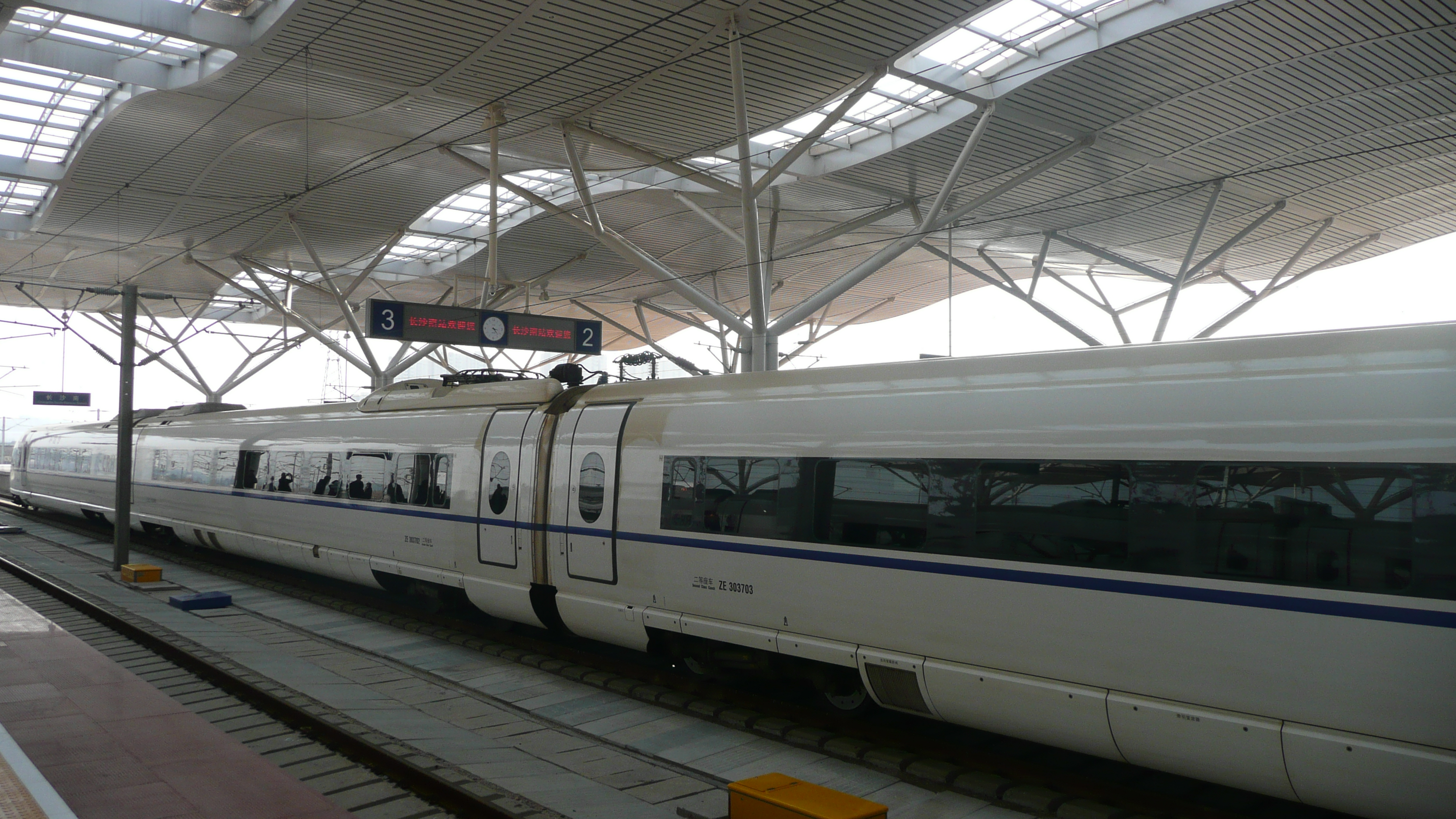
CRH3 trainsets going northwards

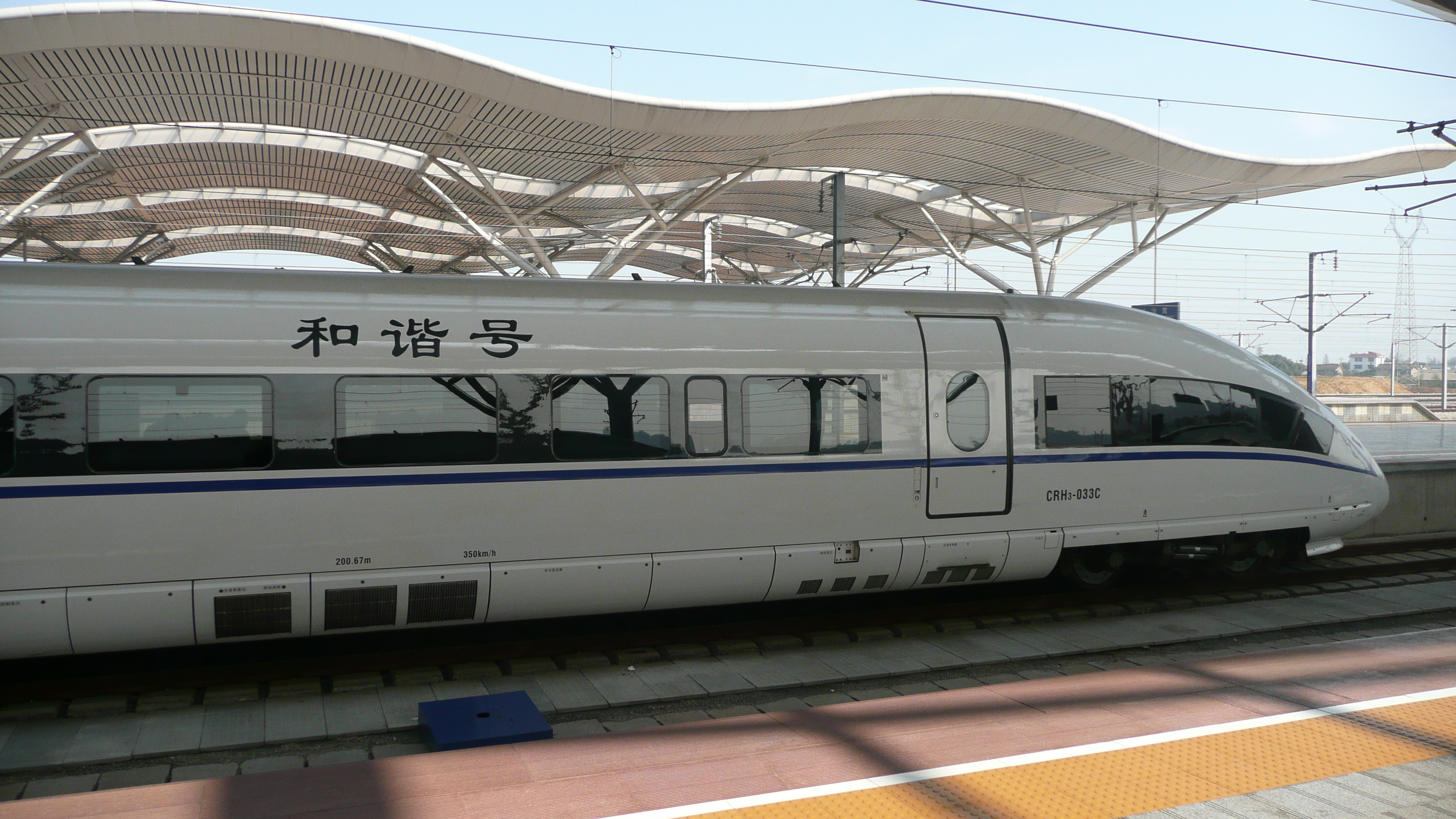
A south-bound CRH3 locomotive

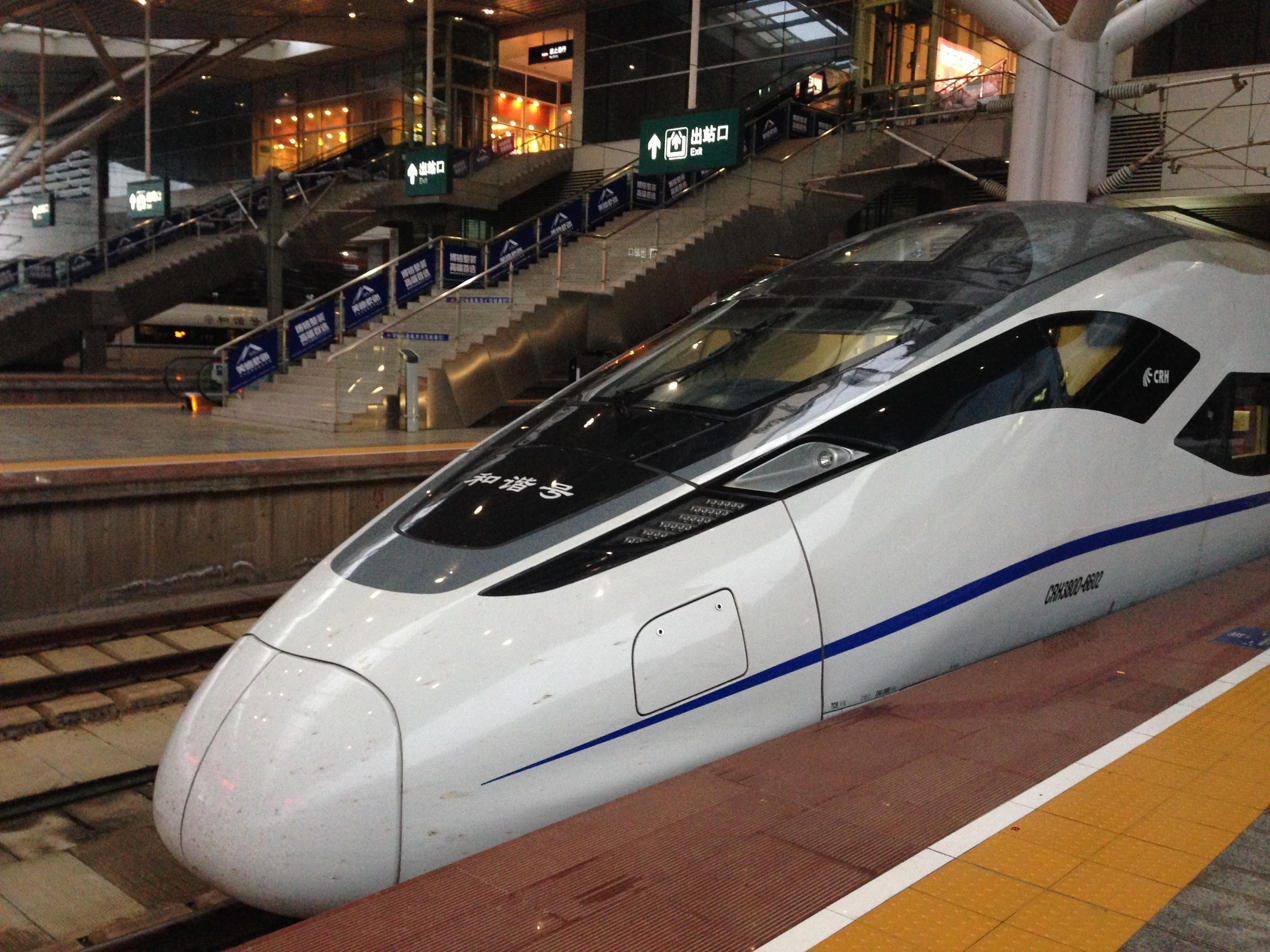
A CRH380D at Changsha Station

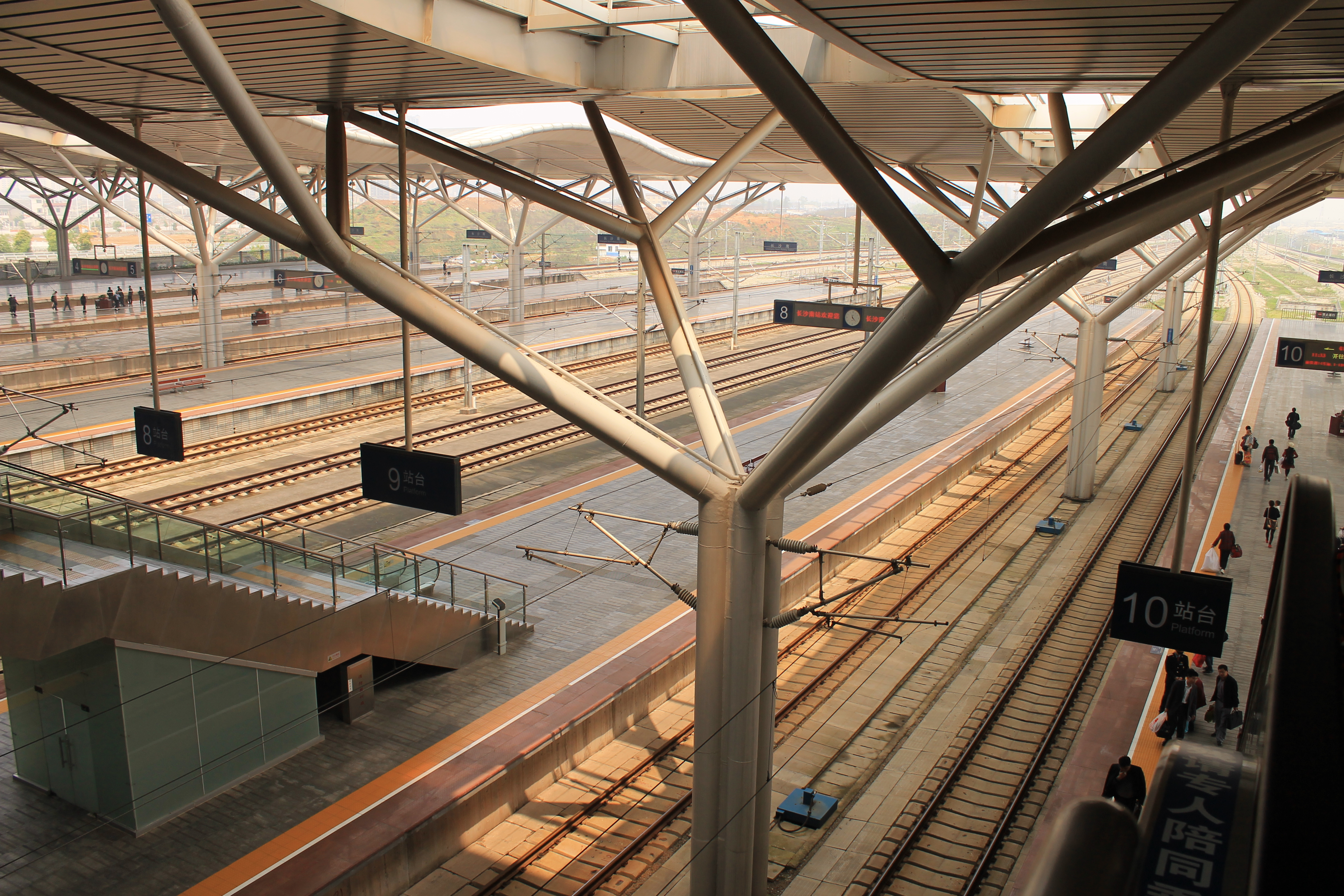
viewing the platform from Departure Hall

== Rail services ==
=== China Railway ===
Changshanan 长沙南
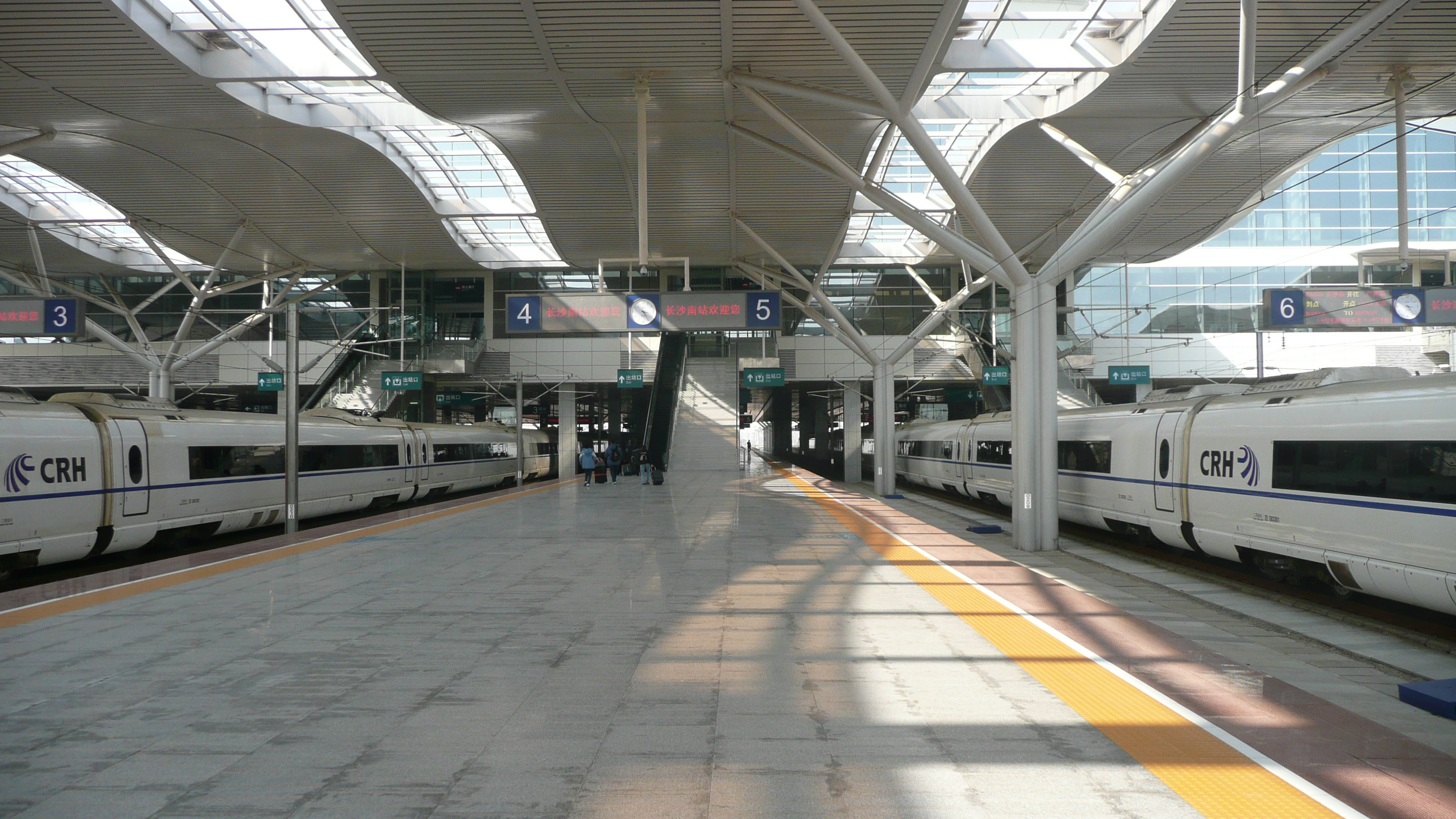

General information
- Other names: Changsha South
- Location: Yuhua District, Changsha, Hunan; China
- Operator: CR Guangzhou
- Lines: Wuhan–Guangzhou high-speed railway; Shanghai–Kunming high-speed railway; Changsha–Ganzhou high-speed railway (under construction)
- Platforms: 13 (CRH)

Other information
- Station code: 65818 (TMIS code); CWQ (telegram code); CSN (pinyin code)

History
- Opened: 26 December 2009
Location

The station is served by the Wuhan–Guangzhou and Shanghai–Kunming high-speed railways.

Preceding station	China Railway High-speed	Following station
Miluo East towards Wuhan	Wuhan–Guangzhou high-speed railway	Zhuzhou West towards Guangzhou South
Liling East towards Shanghai Hongqiao	Shanghai–Kunming high-speed railway	Xiangtan North towards Kunming South

=== Changsha Metro ===
South Railway Station 长沙火车南站
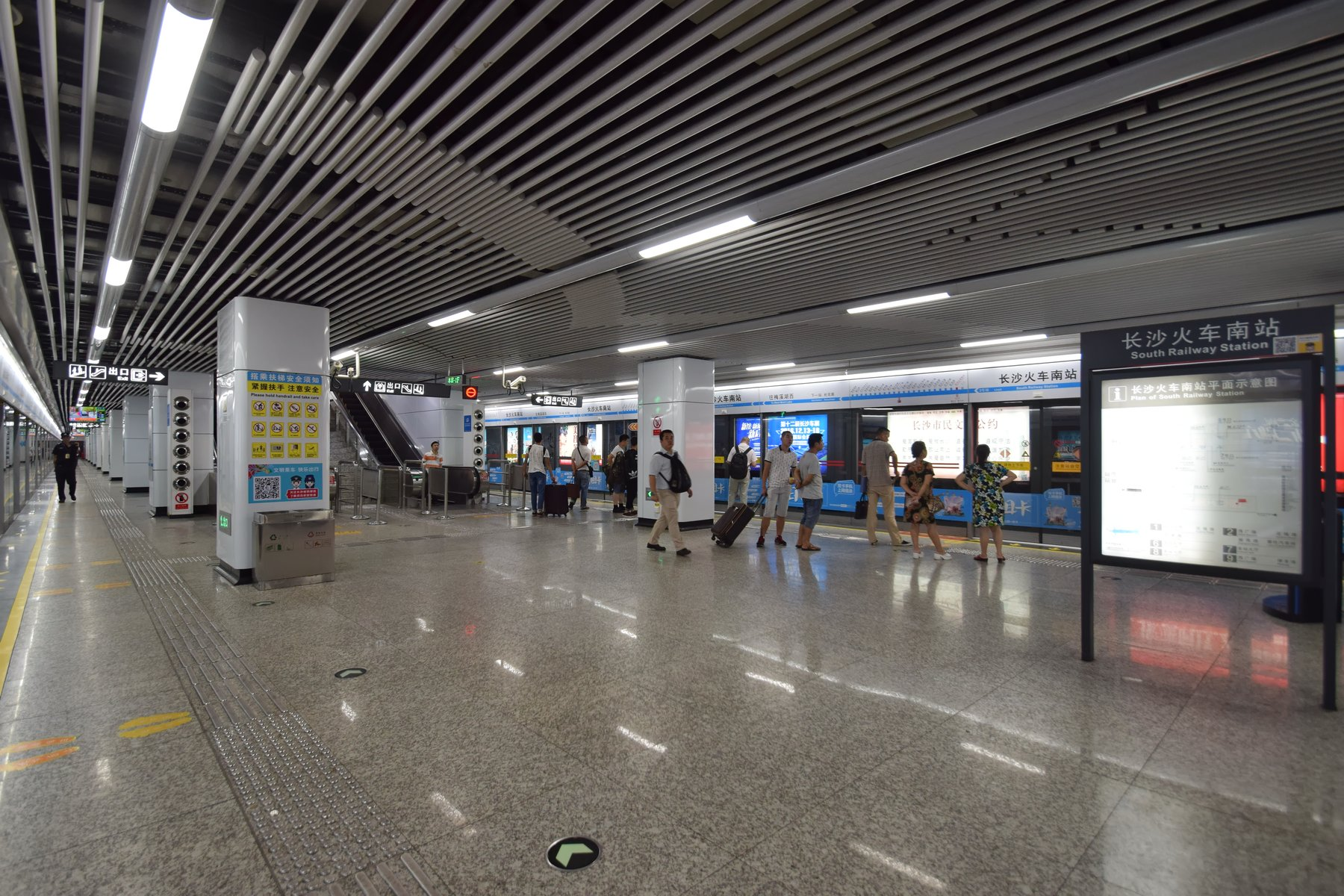
- Changsha South railway station

General information
- Other names: Changsha South
- Location: Yuhua District, Changsha, Hunan; China
- Operator: Changsha Metro
- Lines: Line 2; Line 4
- Platforms: 4 (2 island platforms)

Other information
- Station code: 222

History
- Opened: 29 April 2014

Services
Preceding station	Changsha Metro	Following station
Duhua Road towards Longhuling	Line 2	Guangda Terminus
Pingyang towards Guanziling	Line 4	Guangda towards Dujiaping
Location

Line 2 and Line 4 of Changsha Metro connects Changsha South Railway Station with the city. For Line 2, Changsha South Railway Station is the second station from the east (after Guangda). All other stops are in the west and the terminal is Wangchengpo to which the ride takes about 40 minutes.

==== Layout ====
G		Exits
LG1	Concourse	Faregates, Station Agent
LG2		← Line 2 towards West Meixi Lake (Duhua Road)
LG2	Island platform, doors open on the left
LG2		Line 2 towards Guangda (Terminus) →
LG2		← Line 4 towards Guanziling (Pingyang)
LG2	Island platform, doors open on the left
LG2		→ Line 4 towards Dujiaping (Guangda)

=== Changsha Maglev ===
Changshanan 磁浮高铁站 Maglev
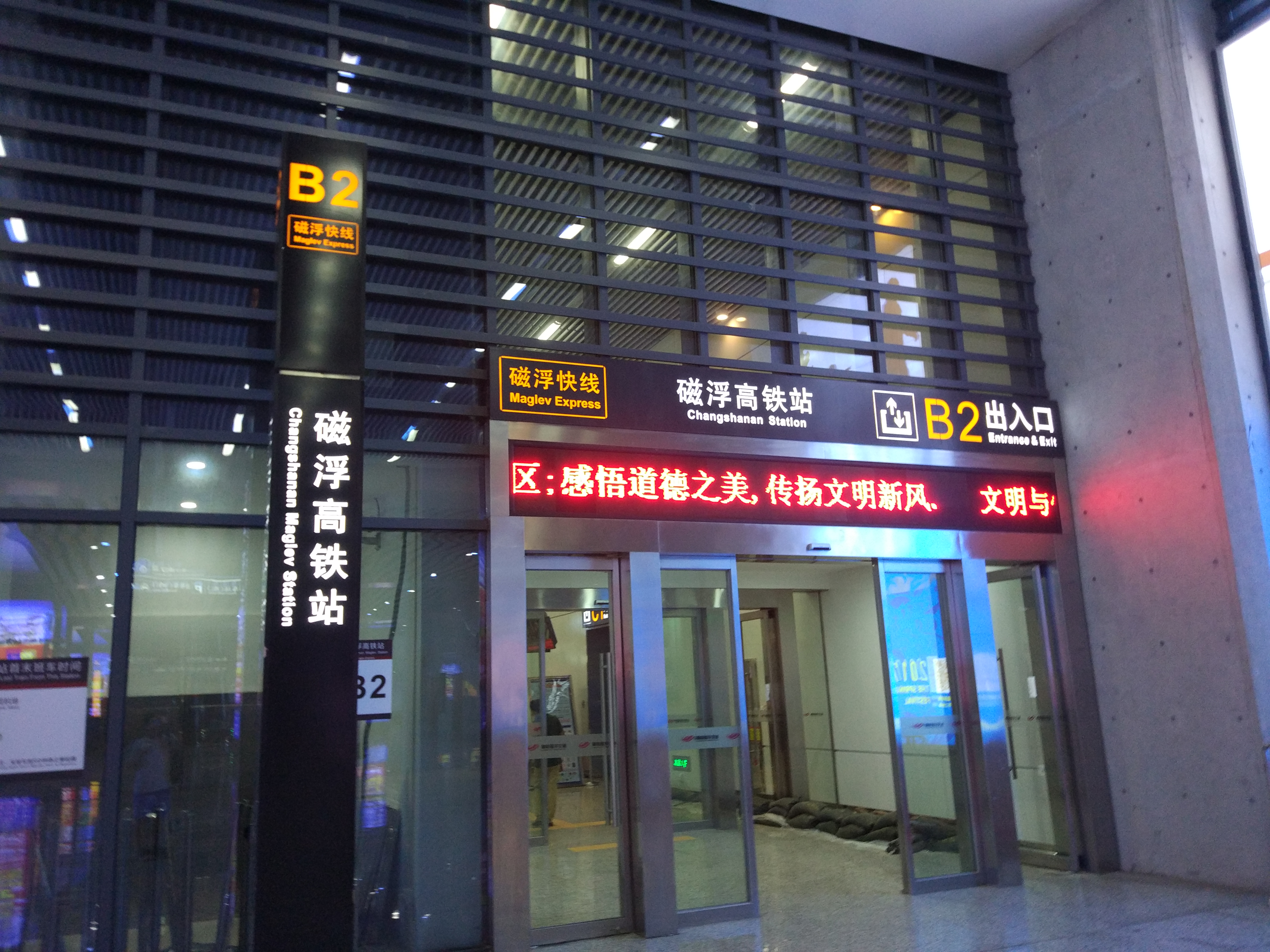

Chinese name
- Simplified Chinese: 磁浮高铁站
- Traditional Chinese: 磁浮高鐵站
- Literal meaning: Maglev high-speed rail station
Transcriptions
Standard Mandarin
- Hanyu Pinyin: Cífú gāotiě zhàn

General information
- Other names: Changsha South
- Location: Yuhua District, Changsha, Hunan; China
- Operator: Hunan Maglev Transportation Development Co., Ltd.
- Line: Changsha Maglev Express

History
- Opened: 6 May 2016
Location

The medium-low speed Changsha Maglev Express between Changsha South Railway Station and Changsha Huanghua International Airport started services on 6 May 2016. The Maglev line is 18.5 km long and trains run at a speed of 120 km/h to finish the journey in just over ten minutes.

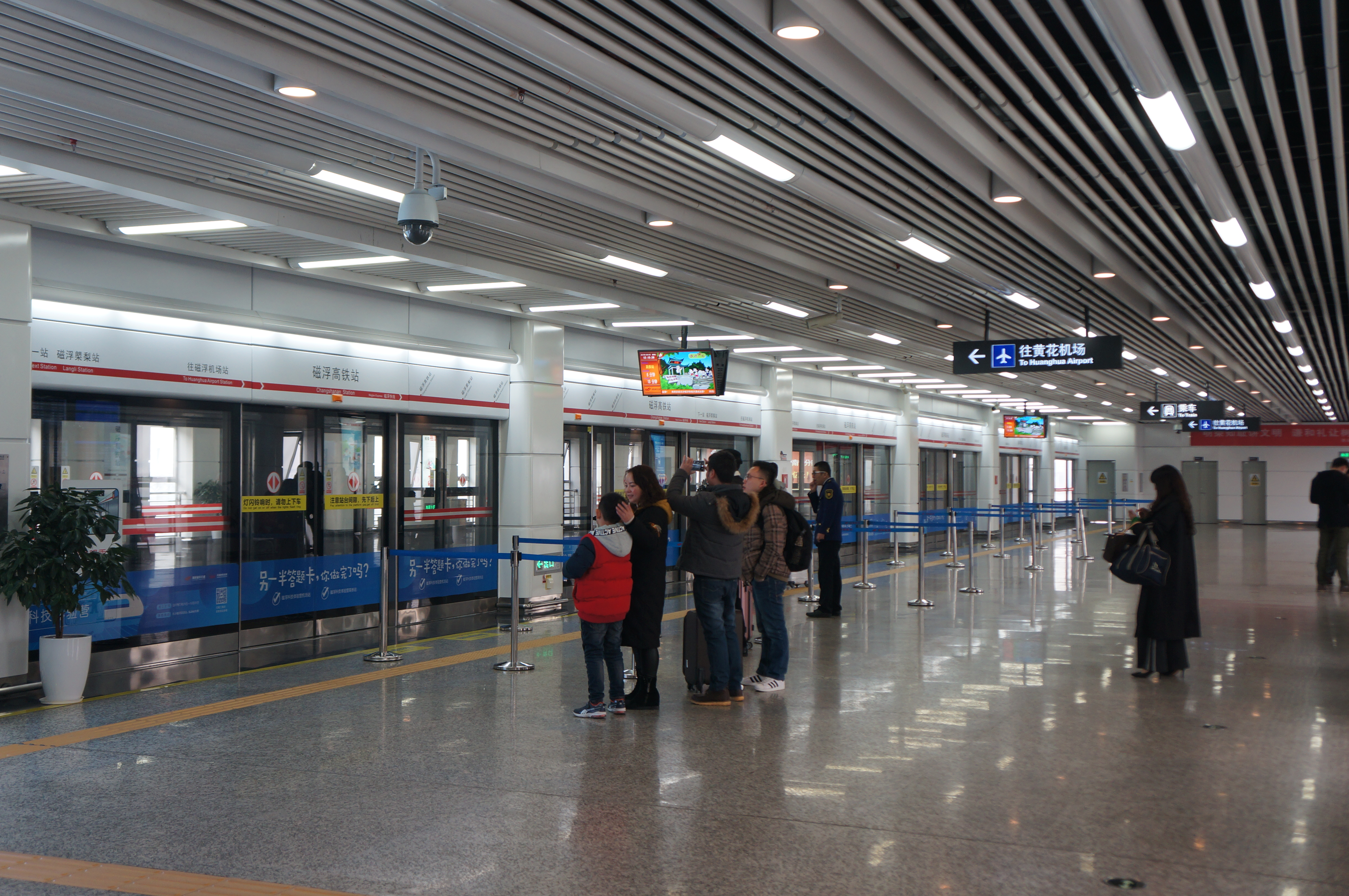
Departure Platform of Maglev Station

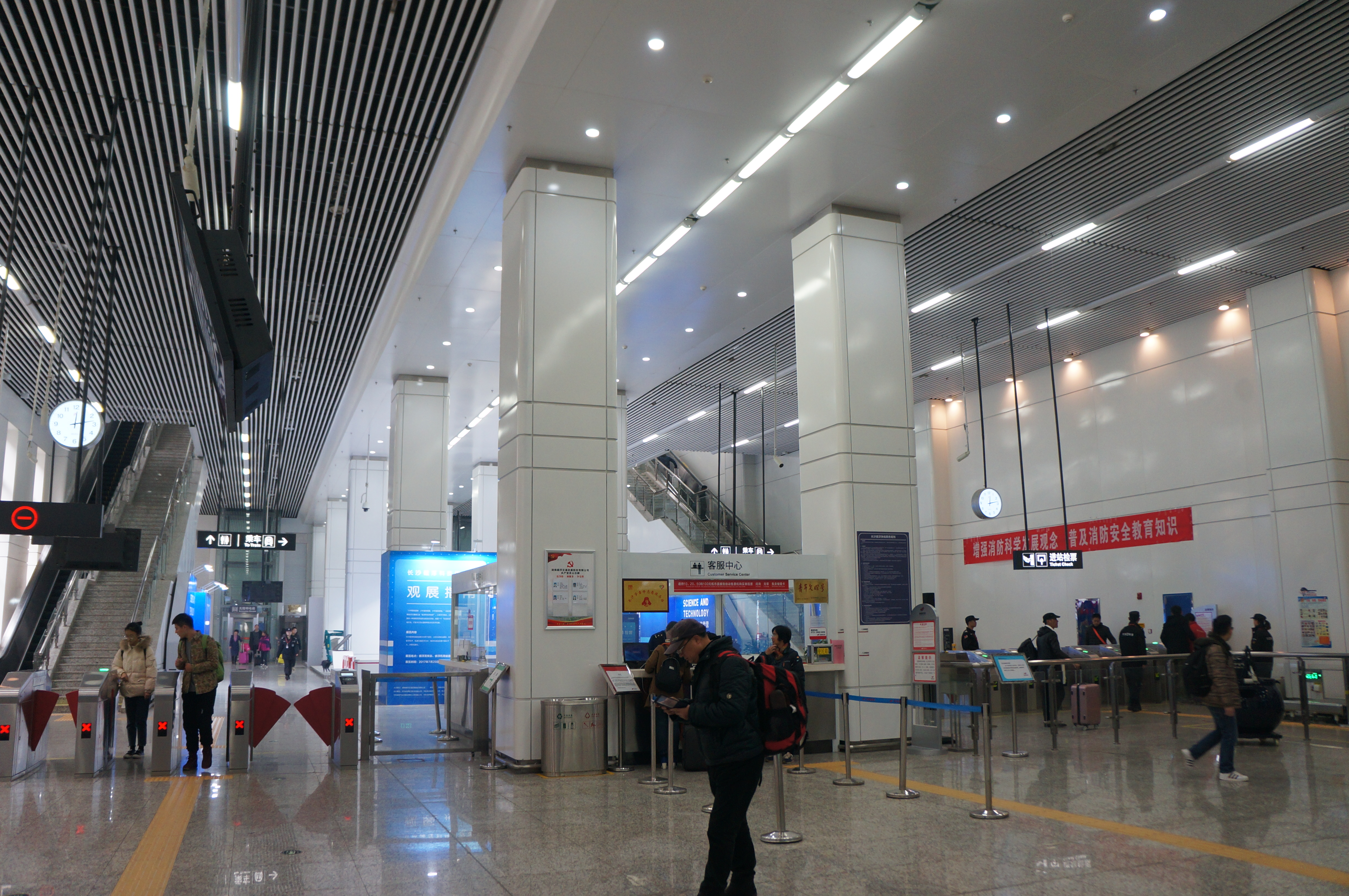
Concourse of Maglev Station

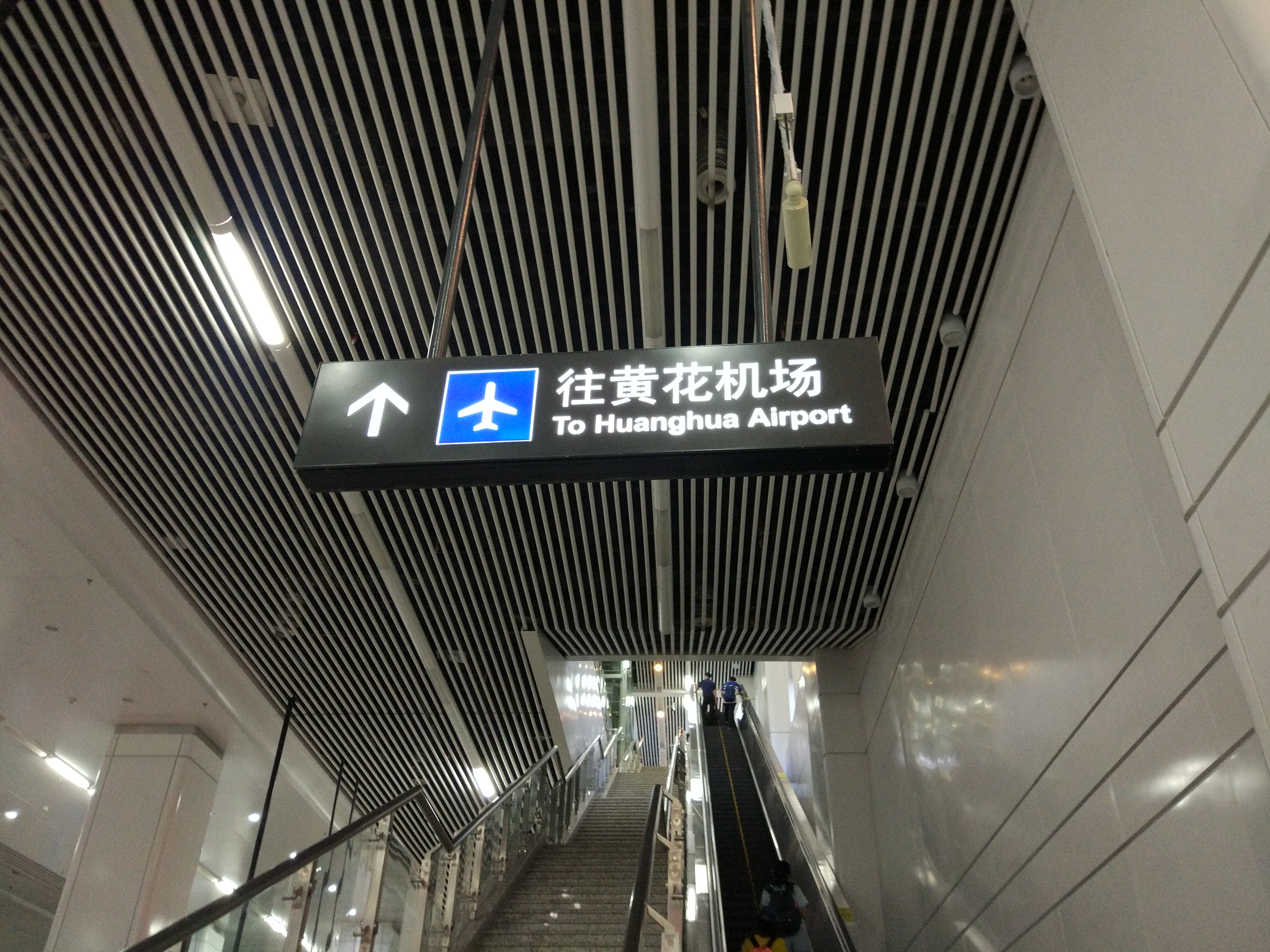
Guidance in Maglev Station

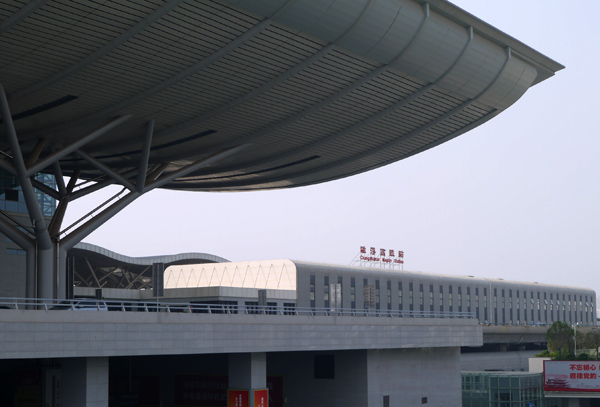
The exterior of Maglev Station

== Local transport ==
=== City Bus ===
Many buses serve Changsha South Railway Station:

- 16, 124, 135, 159, 160, 348, 503, 63 (express), 66

The tickets for all buses cost about ¥2. Check the timetables and routes at the bus terminal.

=== Taxi ===
The distance to city center is approximately 10 kilometers and the charging standards are as following.

- 05:00-21:00 Initial price: ¥6 for first 2 km, then ¥1.8/km and finally ¥2.7/km after 10 km
- 21:00-05:00 Initial price: ¥7 for first 2 km, then ¥2.2/km and finally ¥2.7/km after 10 km

=== Airport Coach ===
The service is to Changsha Huanghua International Airport. It takes about half an hour.

- Line 3: South Bus Station via Changsha South Railway Station (Price: 21.5CNY single)

== See also ==
- Changsha railway station
- Changsha Metro
