= West Yueliangdao station =

Metro station in Changsha, China

West Yueliangdao station 月亮岛西
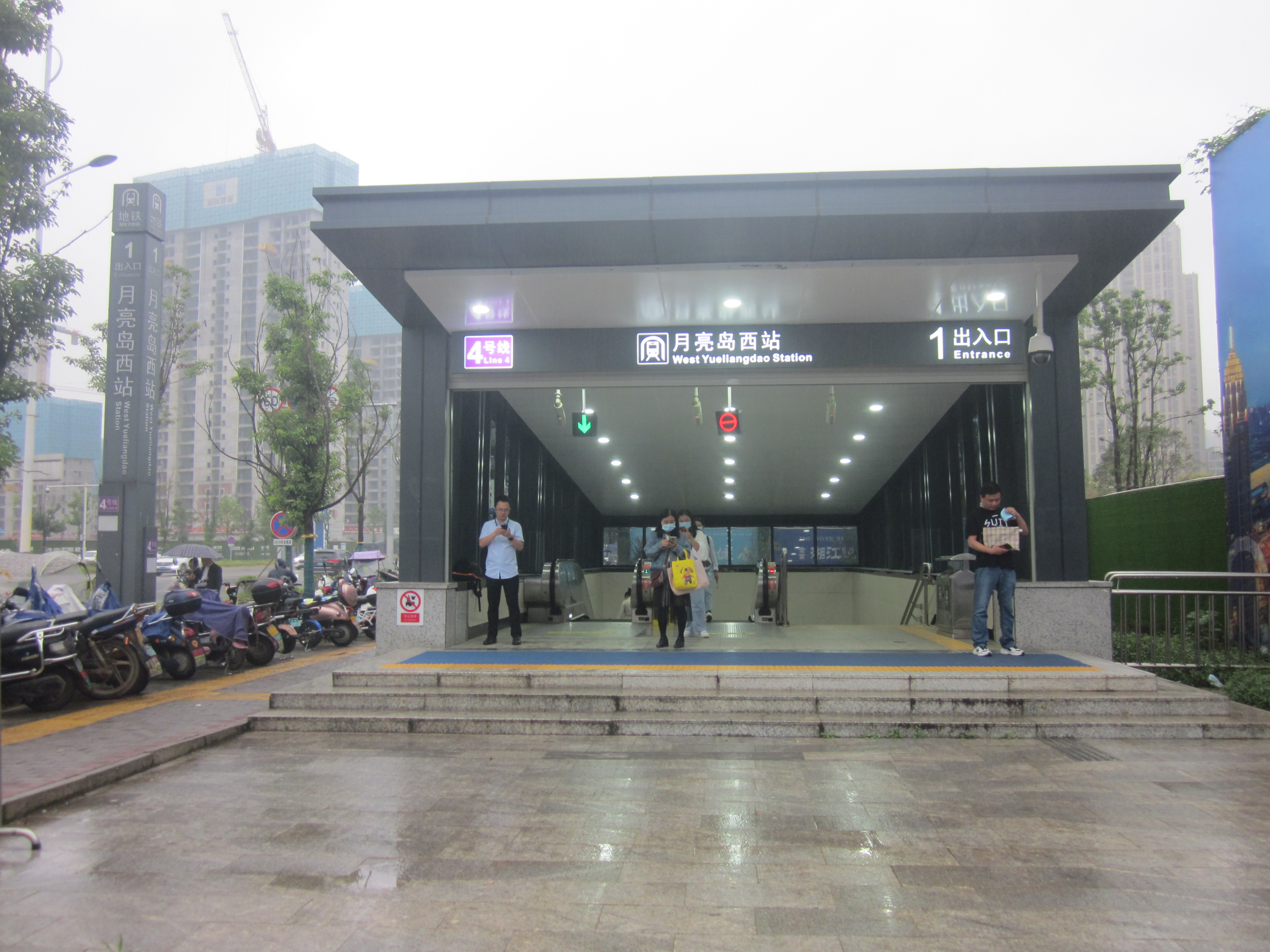
- No. 1 Entrance of West Yueliangdao Station

General information
- Location: Wangcheng District, Changsha, Hunan; China
- Coordinates: 28°17′26″N 112°55′27″E
- Operated by: Changsha Metro
- Line(s): Line 4
- Platforms: 1 island platform

History
- Opened: 26 May 2019

Services
Preceding station	Changsha Metro	Following station
Guanziling Terminus	Line 4	Xiangjiang New Town towards Dujiaping
Location

West Yueliangdao station (simplified Chinese: 月亮岛西站; traditional Chinese: 月亮島西站; pinyin: Yuèliàngdǎo Xī Zhàn; lit. 'West Moon Island station') is an interchange station on Line 4 and Line 10 of the Changsha subway, operated by the operator Changsha Metro.

== Station layout ==
The station has one island platform. It has four entrances.

== History ==
The station opened on 26 May 2019.

== Surrounding area ==
- High School Affiliated to Hunan Normal University
- The Moon Island (月亮岛)
