= Nanhu Road station =

Metro station in Changsha, China

Nanhu Road Station 南湖路站
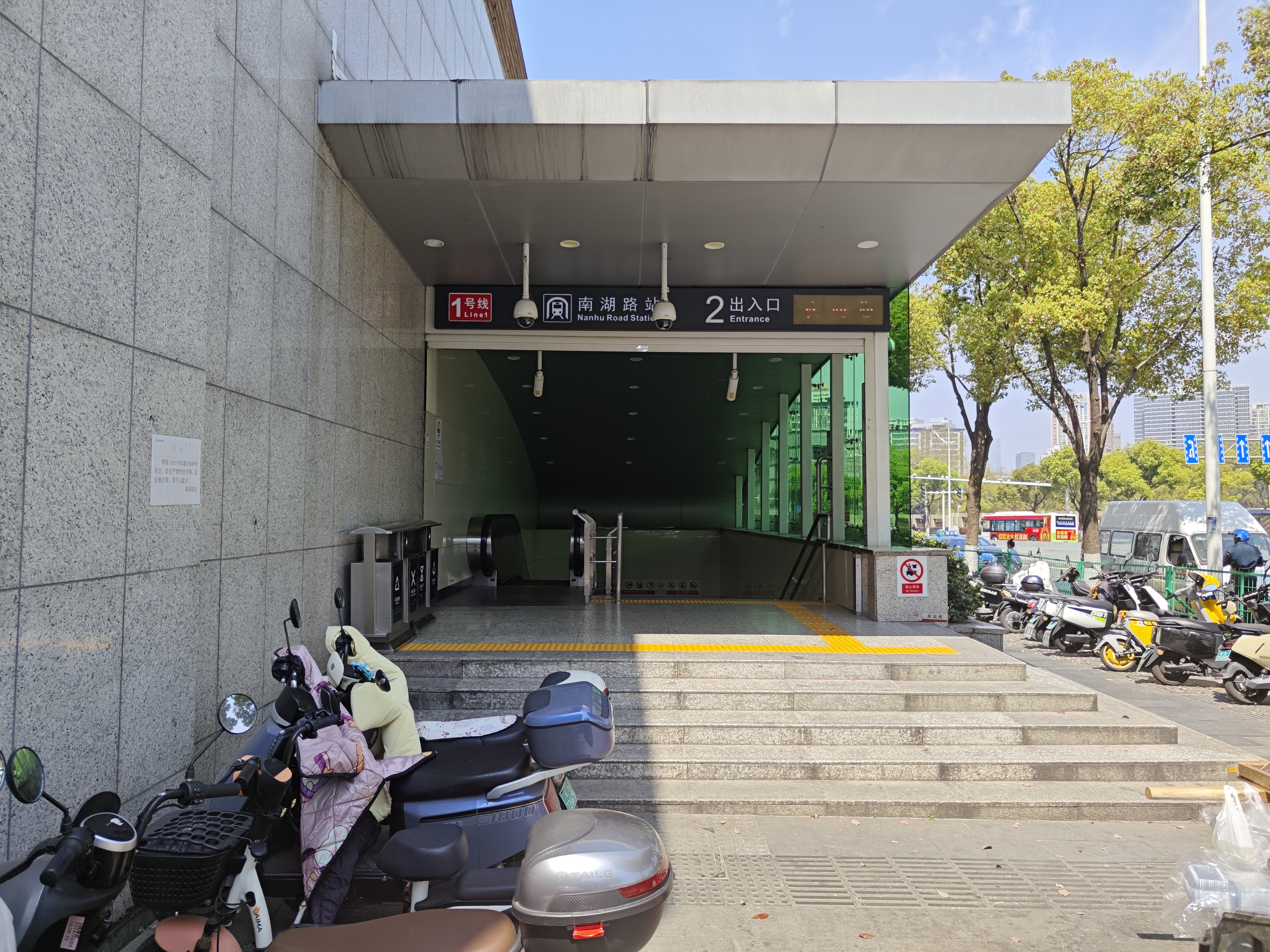
- Entrance No. 2 of Nanhu Road Station.

General information
- Location: Tianxin District/ Yuhua District, Changsha, Hunan; China
- Coordinates: 28°10′18″N 112°59′32″E
- Operated by: Changsha Metro
- Line: Line 1
- Platforms: 2 (1 island platform)

History
- Opened: 28 June 2016; 9 years ago

Services
Preceding station	Changsha Metro	Following station
Houjiatang towards Jinpenqiu	Line 1	Huangtuling towards Shangshuangtang
Location

Nanhu Road station is a subway station in Tianxin District/ Yuhua District, Changsha, Hunan, China, operated by the Changsha subway operator Changsha Metro. It entered revenue service on June 28, 2016.

== History ==
The station opened on 28 June 2016.

== Layout ==
G		Exits
LG1	Concourse	Faregates, Station Agent
LG2	←	Line 1 towards Jinpenqiu (Houjiatang)
LG2	Island platform, doors open on the left
LG2		Line 1 towards Shangshuangtang (Huangtuling)	→

== Surrounding area ==
- Ai'er Eye Hospital
- Changsha No. 3 Hospital
- Changsha University of Science and Technology
- He Long Stadium
- Dongtang Heiwado (平和堂东塘店)
