= CWQ =

CWQ can refer to:

- Changsha South railway station, a train station in Changsha, Hunan province, China, by telegraph code
- Central West Queensland, a remote region of Queensland, Australia
