= Line 4 (Changsha Metro) =

Metro line in Changsha, China

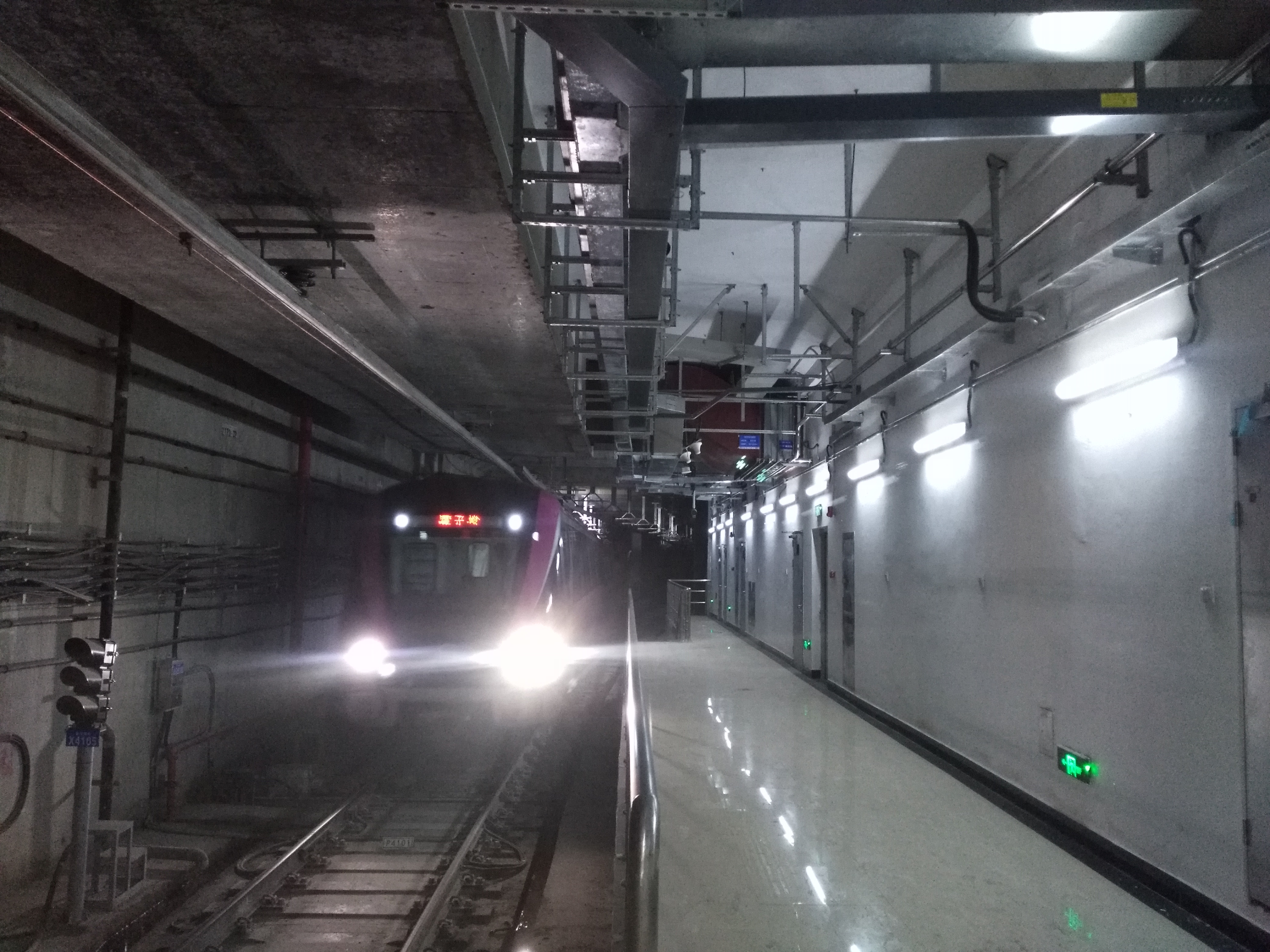
- Line 4 train arriving at Guangda Station

Overview
- Status: Operational
- Owner: Changsha Government
- Locale: Changsha, Hunan, China
- Termini: Guanziling; Dujiaping
- Stations: 25

Service
- Type: Rapid transit
- System: Changsha Metro
- Services: 1
- Operator(s): Changsha Metro Corporation
- Rolling stock: 6-car Type B

History
- Opened: 26 May 2019; 7 years ago

Technical
- Line length: 33.5 km (20.82 mi)
- Number of tracks: 2
- Character: Underground
- Track gauge: 1,435 mm (4 ft 8 1/2 in)

Line 4 of the Changsha Metro (Chinese: 长沙地铁四号线; pinyin: Chǎngshā Dìtiě Sì Hào Xiàn) is a rapid transit line in Changsha. It began trial operations without passengers on 29 December 2018. The line opened on 26 May 2019 with 25 stations.

== Opening timeline ==
Segment	Commencement	Length	Station(s)	Name
Guanziling — Dujiaping	26 May 2019	33.5 km (20.82 mi)	25	Phase 1

== Stations ==
Section	Station name		Connections	Distance km	Location
Section	English	Chinese	Connections	Distance km	Location
Phase 1	Guanziling	罐子岭			
Phase 1	West Yueliangdao	月亮岛西			
Phase 1	Xiangjiang New Town	湘江新城			
Phase 1	Hanwangling Park	汉王陵公园			
Phase 1	West Fuyuan Bridge	福元大桥西			
Phase 1	Chazishan	茶子山			
Phase 1	Guanshaling	观沙岭	CZT		
Phase 1	Liugoulong	六沟垅	6		
Phase 1	Wangyuehu	望月湖			
Phase 1	Yingwanzhen	溁湾镇	2		
Phase 1	Hunan Normal University	湖南师大			
Phase 1	Hunan University	湖南大学			
Phase 1	Fubuhe	阜埠河	3		
Phase 1	Bishahu	碧沙湖			
Phase 1	Huangtuling	黄土岭	1		
Phase 1	Shazitang	砂子塘	7		
Phase 1	Chigangling	赤岗岭			
Phase 1	Shumuling	树木岭	CZT		
Phase 1	Guitang	圭塘	5		
Phase 1	Shawan Park	沙湾公园	2		
Phase 1	Sutang	粟塘			
Phase 1	Pingyang	平阳			
Phase 1	South Railway Station	长沙火车南站	2 Maglev CWQ		
Phase 1	Guangda	光达	2		
Phase 1	Dujiaping	杜家坪			
