= Guanziling station =

Metro station in Changsha, China

Guanziling station 罐子岭
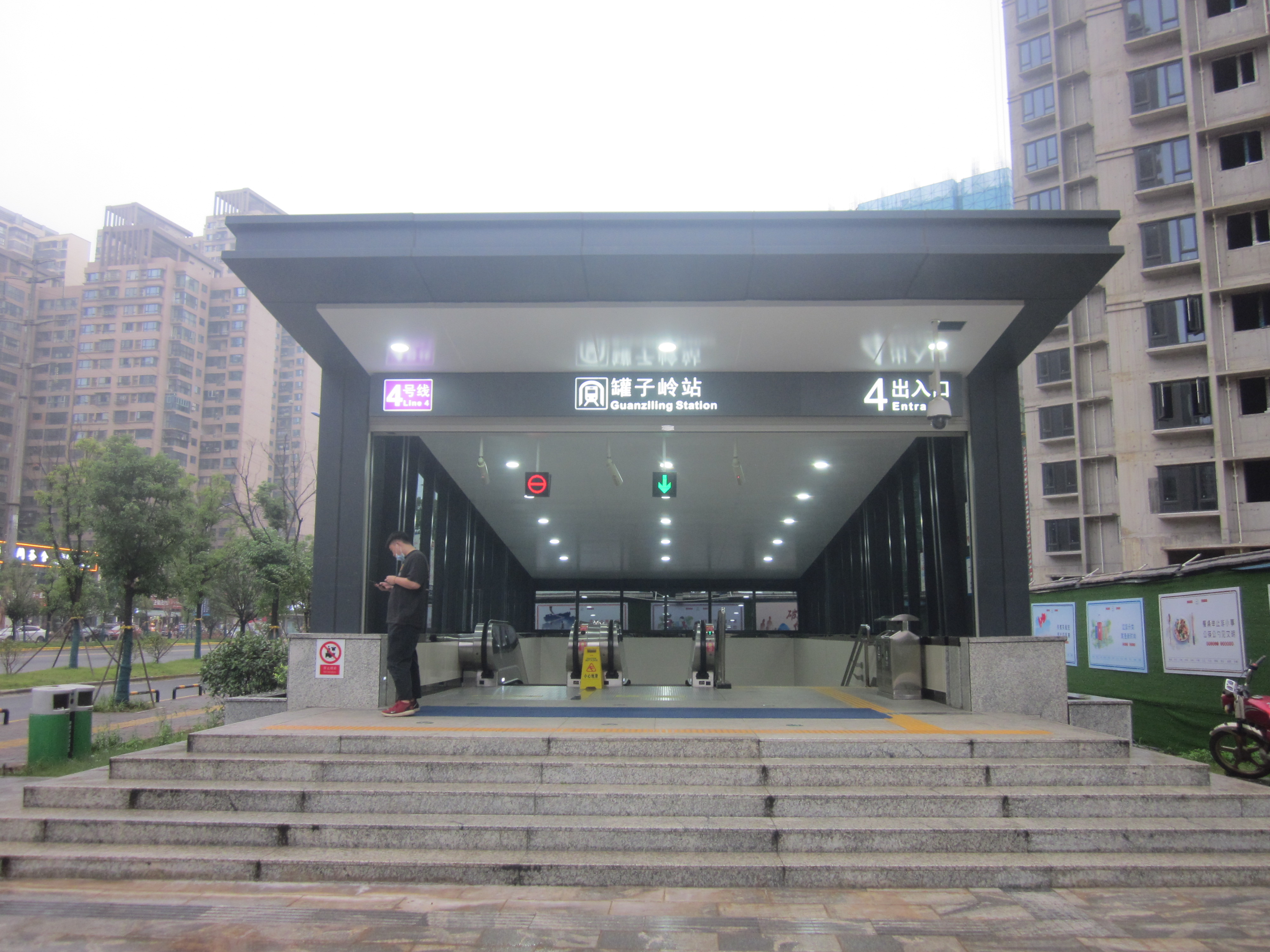
- No. 4 Entrance of Guanziling Station

General information
- Location: Wangcheng District, Changsha, Hunan; China
- Coordinates: 28°17′52″N 112°55′05″E
- Operated by: Changsha Metro
- Line: Line 4
- Platforms: 1 island platform

History
- Opened: 26 May 2019

Services
Preceding station	Changsha Metro	Following station
Terminus	Line 4	West Yueliangdao towards Dujiaping
Location

Guanziling station (simplified Chinese: 罐子岭站; traditional Chinese: 罐子嶺站; pinyin: Guànzǐlǐng Zhàn) is a subway station in Changsha, Hunan, China, operated by the Changsha subway operator Changsha Metro.

== Station layout ==
The station has one island platform.

== History ==
Construction began on July 13, 2015. The station opened on 26 May 2019.

== Surrounding area ==
- Changsha Medical University
- Hunan University of Technology and Commerce
- High School Affiliated to Hunan Normal University
- The Moon Island (月亮岛)
