= Dujiaping station =

Metro station in Changsha, China

Dujiaping station 杜家坪站
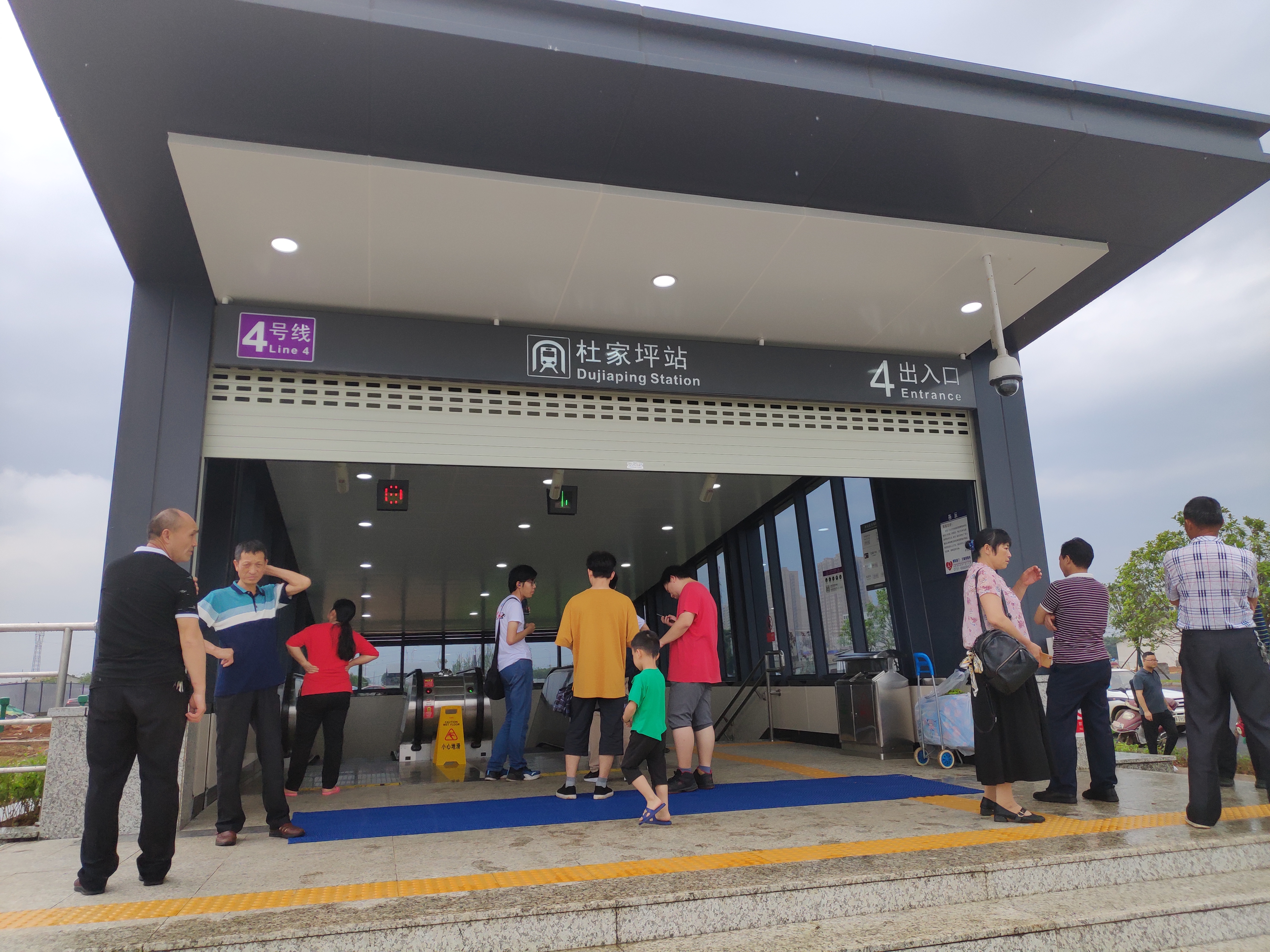
- No. 4 Entrance of Dujiaping Station.

General information
- Location: Changsha County, Changsha, Hunan; China
- Coordinates: 28°08′38″N 113°05′14″E
- Operated by: Changsha Metro
- Line: Line 4
- Platforms: 1 island platform

History
- Opened: 26 May 2019

Services
Preceding station	Changsha Metro	Following station
Guangda towards Guanziling	Line 4	Terminus
Location

Dujiaping station (Chinese: 杜家坪站; pinyin: Dùjiāpíng Zhàn) is a subway station in Changsha, Hunan, China, operated by the Changsha subway operator Changsha Metro.

== Station layout ==
The station has one island platform.

== History ==
The station was completed in July 2017. The station opened on 26 May 2019.

== Surrounding area ==
- Former Residence of Xu Guangda
