= Changsha Metro =

Rapid transit system in Changsha, Hunan, China

Coordinates: 28.2035°N 112.9577°E

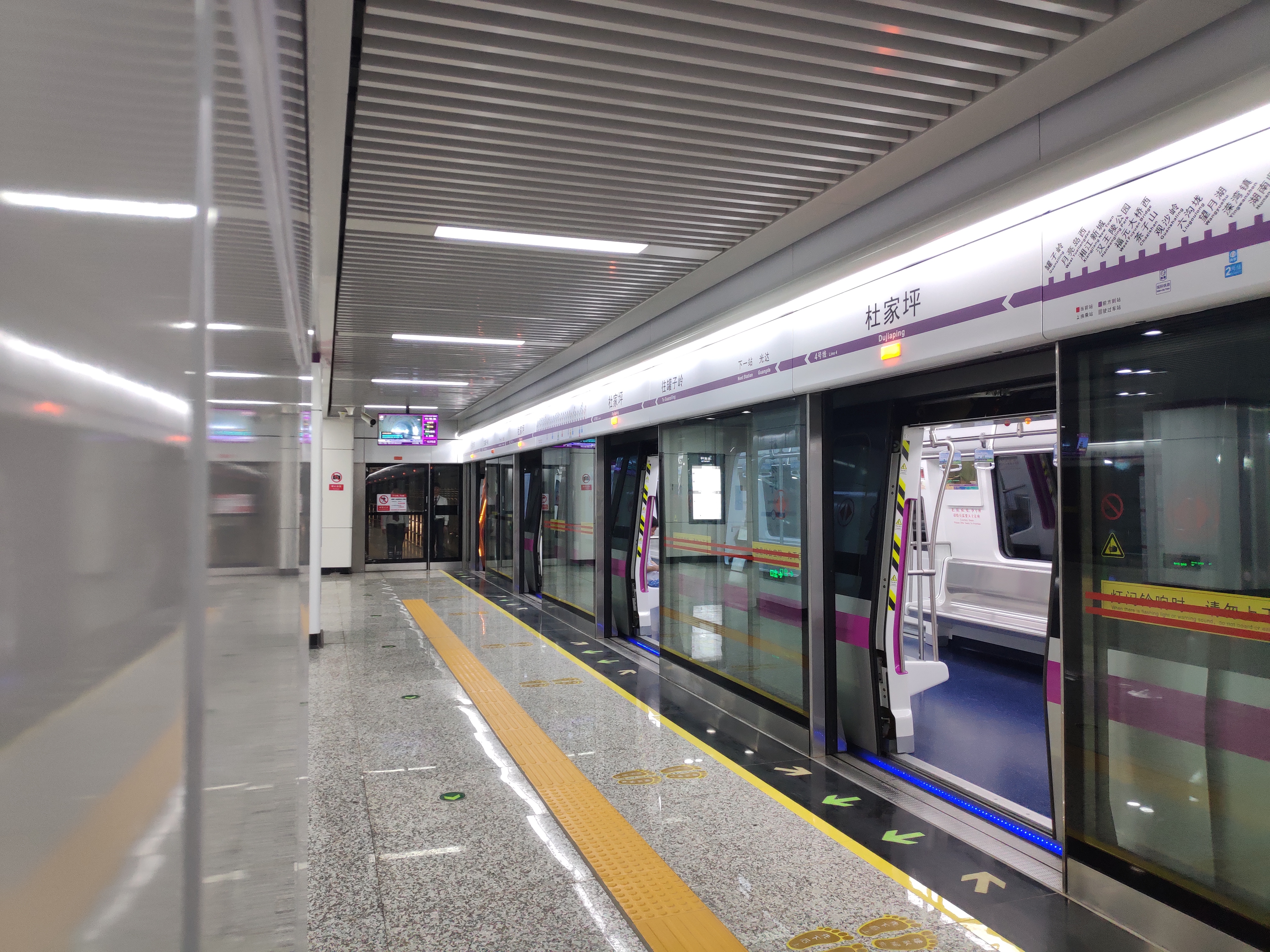
- Platform of Dujiaping station

Overview
- Native name: 长沙轨道交通
- Owner: Changsha Government
- Locale: Changsha and Xiangtan, Hunan, China
- Transit type: Rapid transit
- Number of lines: 6
- Number of stations: 148
- Daily ridership: 2,580,169 (2023); 4,675,000 (2025 peak)
- Website: http://www.hncsmtr.com/

Operation
- Began operation: April 29, 2014; 12 years ago
- Operator: Changsha Metro Corporation Ltd.
- Character: Elevated, underground

Technical
- System length: 228.49 kilometres (141.98 mi)
System map

The Changsha Metro (officially 长沙轨道交通; chángshā guǐdào jiāotōng; usually called 长沙地铁; chángshā dìtiě) is a rapid transit system in Changsha and Xiangtan. The first operational line, Line 2, commenced service on April 29, 2014, making Changsha the 18th city in mainland China to open a rapid transit system.

== Lines in operation ==
Changsha Maglev is not included in the list.

| Line | Terminals (District) | | Commencement | Newest extension | Length | Stations |
|---|---|---|---|---|---|---|
| | Jinpenqiu (Kaifu) | Shangshuangtang (Tianxin) | June 28, 2016 | June 28, 2024 | 33.43 km (20.77 mi) | 25 |
| | Longhuling (Yuelu) | Guangda (Changsha Co.) | April 29, 2014 | September 4, 2026 | 37.26 km (23.15 mi) | 32 |
| | Guangsheng (Changsha Co.) | Xiangtan North Railway Station (Yuhu, Xiangtan) | June 28, 2020 | June 28, 2023 | 53.69 km (33.36 mi) | 33 |
| | Guanziling (Wangcheng) | Dujiaping (Changsha Co.) | May 26, 2019 | － | 33.50 km (20.82 mi) | 25 |
| | Maozhutang (Yuhua) | Shuiduhe (Changsha Co.) | June 28, 2020 | － | 22.50 km (13.98 mi) | 18 |
| | Xiejiaqiao (Wangcheng) | Huanghua Airport T1 & T2 (Changsha Co.) | June 28, 2022 | － | 48.11 km (29.89 mi) | 34 |
| Total | | | | | 228.49 km (141.98 mi) | 148 |

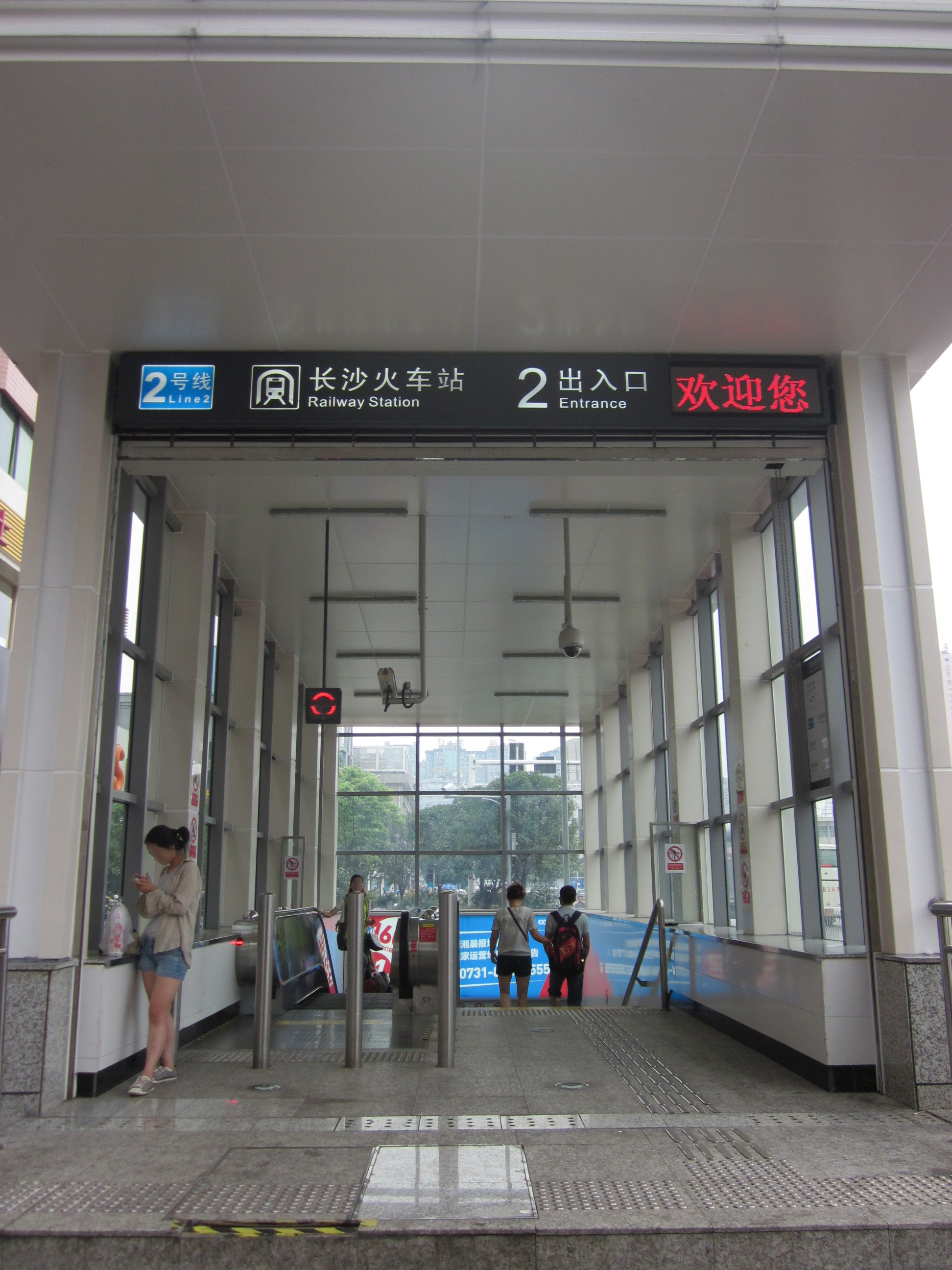
Changsha Railway Station metro entrance

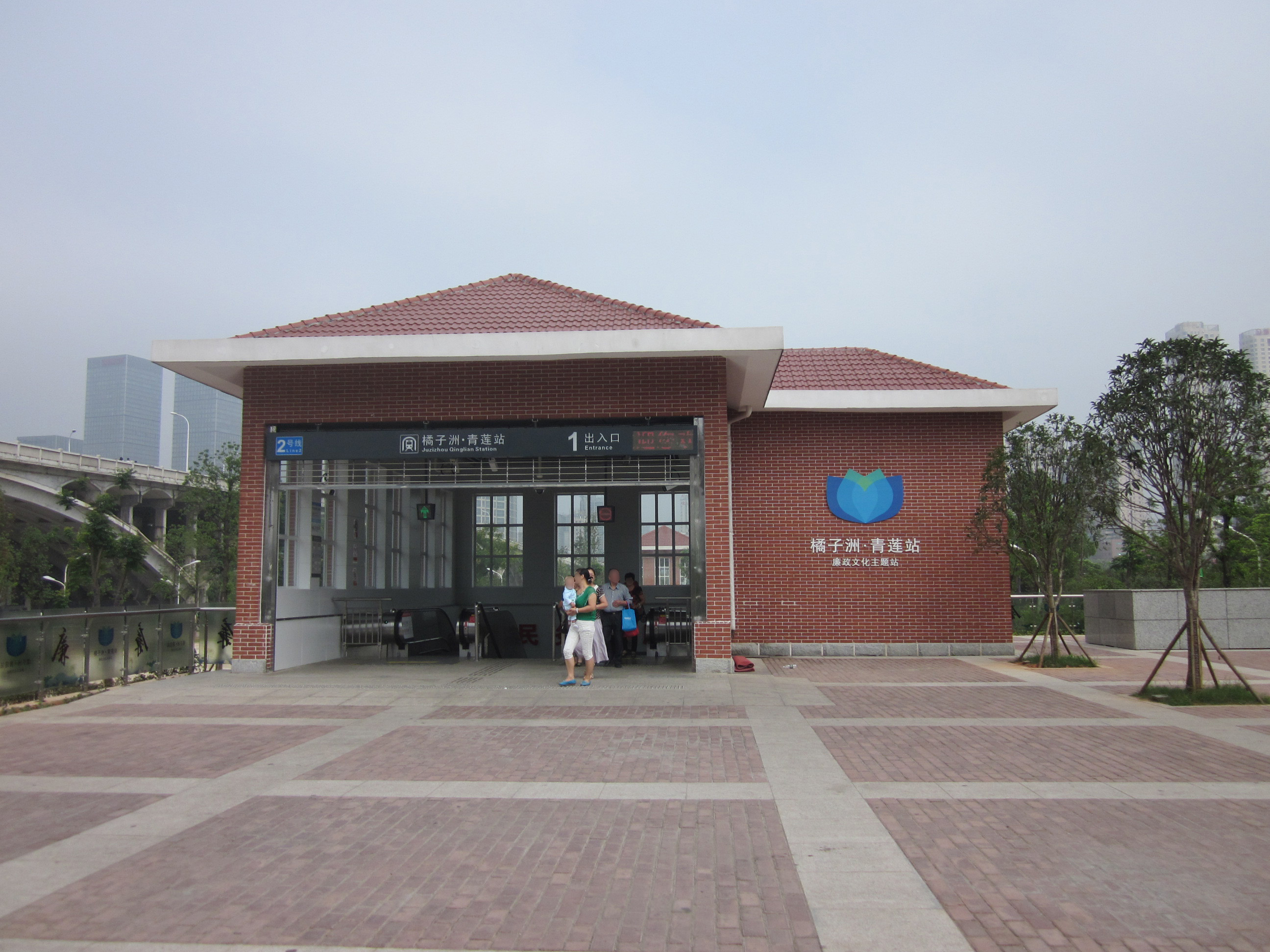
Juzizhou Qinglian station entrance

=== Line 1 ===
Line 1 construction began in 2010 and was opened on June 28, 2016. A 9.9-kilometre (6.2 mi) extension to Line 1 opened in 2024. Line 1 has a line length of 33.43 kilometres (20.77 mi) with 25 stations, of which 3 is elevated and 22 are underground. The construction budget was 14.2 billion RMB. Line 1 is red on system maps.

=== Line 2 ===
Line 2 is a line running from west to east in Changsha. It was opened on April 29, 2014 and extended in December 2015. The line is 26.6 kilometres (16.5 mi) long with 23 stations. Line 2 is light blue on system maps.

=== Line 3 ===
Line 3 started construction on January 3, 2014. The line opened on June 28, 2020. Line 3 has a total length of 53.69 kilometres (33.36 mi) with 33 stations. The line travels between Xiangtan North railway station and Guangsheng station. A southern extension was opened on June 28, 2023. Line 3 is yellow-green on system maps.

=== Line 4 ===
Line 4 started construction on December 31, 2014. The line opened on May 26, 2019, with 25 stations. Line 4 has a total length of 33.5 kilometres (20.8 mi) with 25 stations. The line travels between Guanziling station and Dujiaping station. Line 4 is purple on system maps.

=== Line 5 ===
Line 5 started construction in 2015. The line opened on June 28, 2020. Line 5 has a total length of 22.5 kilometres (14.0 mi) with 18 stations. It travels between Maozhutang station and Shuiduhe station. Line 5 is yellow on system maps.

=== Line 6 ===
Line 6 opened on June 28, 2022. It runs in an east–west direction, connecting the airport with the downtown. The middle section of Line 6 started construction on November 28, 2017. The middle section has a total length of 30.46 kilometres (18.93 mi) with 23 stations. The 5.5 kilometres (3.4 mi) western section, with 4 more stations, and the 12.03 kilometres (7.48 mi) eastern section with 7 more stations, was completed in 2022. It travels between Xiejiaqiao station and Huanghua Airport T1 and T2 station. Line 6 is dark blue on system maps.

== Fares and ticket system ==
=== Payment methods ===
==== QR code ====
Passengers can pay their Changsha Metro fares by using QR code. The system supports Alipay, WeChat Pay, UnionPay, the Changsha Metro app, and several other apps. These apps requires one to scan a QR code when entering the fare gate at the origin station and again when exiting at the destination station. The fare is then deducted.

==== Transport card ====
Passengers can pay their Changsha Metro fares by using China T-union (TU) cards. Passengers swipe their TU card on the fare gate at the origin station and again when exiting at the destination station.

==== Single-trip ticket ====
Passengers can buy a single-trip ticket on ticket machines in the metro stations by using cash as well as Alipay, WeChat Pay, or UnionPay.

== Incidents ==
- On June 24, 2024, two lines were flooded after a particularly heavy rainstorm, of 65mm. Social media posts showed the escalator entrance at one station completely submerged.

== Future development ==
=== Short-term expansions ===
| Line | Terminals | | Status | Planned Opening | Length km | Stations | Reference |
|---|---|---|---|---|---|---|---|
| 1 (North Ext. Phase 2) | Dingzizhen | Jinpenqiu | Planned | TBA | 4.63 | 2 | |
| 2 (West Ext.) | West Railway Station | Longhuling | Under Construction | June 28, 2027 | | 2 | |
| 4 (North Ext.) | Baimaxiang | Guanziling | Under Construction | June 28, 2028 | 15.26 | 9 | |
| 5 (South Ext.) | Maozhutang | Datuo East | Planned | June 28, 2030 | 8.43 | 7 | |
| 5 (North Ext.) | Shuiduhe | Weisan Road | Planned | TBA | 3.65 | 2 | |
| 6 (East Ext.) | Huanghua Airport T1 & T2 | Huanghua Airport T3 | Under Construction | 2027 | 3.62 | 1 | |
| 7 | Wulipai | Yuntang | Under Construction | December 28, 2027 | 17 | 16 | |
| 7 (East Ext.) | East Coash Station | Wulipai | Planned | TBA | 5.46 | 5 | |
| 8 | Loop Line | | Planned | TBA | 55.5 | 32 | |

== See also ==
- Changsha Maglev
- Changde–Yiyang–Changsha high-speed railway
- Changsha–Zhuzhou–Xiangtan intercity railway
- Urban rail transit in China
- List of metro systems
