= Xiang River Scenic Belt =

Waterfront in Changsha, China

- 湘江风光带
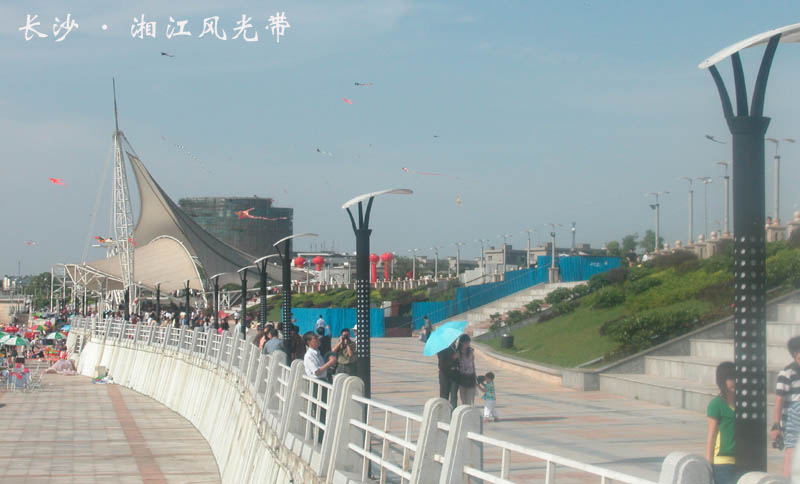

- Location within Hunan
- Type: Public park
- Coordinates: 28°18′N 112°58′E
- Status: Open all year

Chinese name
- Simplified Chinese: 湘江风光带
- Traditional Chinese: 湘江風光帶
Transcriptions
Standard Mandarin
- Hanyu Pinyin: Xiāngjiāng Fēngguāngdài

The Xiang River Scenic Belt (Chinese: 湘江风光带) is a prominent waterfront area in Changsha, Hunan, China, stretching approximately 26-kilometre (16 mi) along the banks of the Xiang River. It serves as a key recreational, cultural, and ecological corridor for Changsha.

== History ==
The development of the Changsha riverfront dates back to the Ming and Qing dynasties (1368–1911), when the city built walls and gates along the Xiang River. In 1920, the city walls were dismantled, and by 1928, the area was converted into a road. Prior to 1949, the riverfront was occupied by cargo terminals, makeshift stilt houses, and suffered from poor sanitation and traffic congestion. After the establishment of the People's Republic of China, the Changsha Municipal People's Government initiated multiple planning projects to transform the area. The riverfront was expanded, roads were widened to 37-to-45-metre (121 to 148 ft), and docks were relocated. Additional improvements included the construction of granite embankments, stone railings, and a 1,600-metre (5,200 ft) flood control and sewage interception system to preserve water quality and prevent flooding.

== Surrounding attractions ==
- Orange Isle
- Du Fu River Pavilion

== Transportation ==
Xiang River Scenic Belt is well-connected to Changsha's public transportation network, with several metro stations providing convenient access: Xiangjiang Middle Road station of Line 1, which offers direct access to the eastern section of Xiang River Scenic Belt near the bustling Wuyi Square area; Juzizhou station of Line 2, which is built directly under Orange Isle, an isle park in the middle of the Xiang River, allowing visitors to explore the central section of Xiang River Scenic Belt; Yingwanzhen station of Line 2, which provides access to the western end of Xiang River Scenic Belt, near Yuelu Mountain and the eastern gate of Yuelu Scenic Area.
