= Xihu Park station =

Metro station in Changsha, China

Coordinates: 28°12′31″N 112°56′48″E

Xihu Park 西湖公园
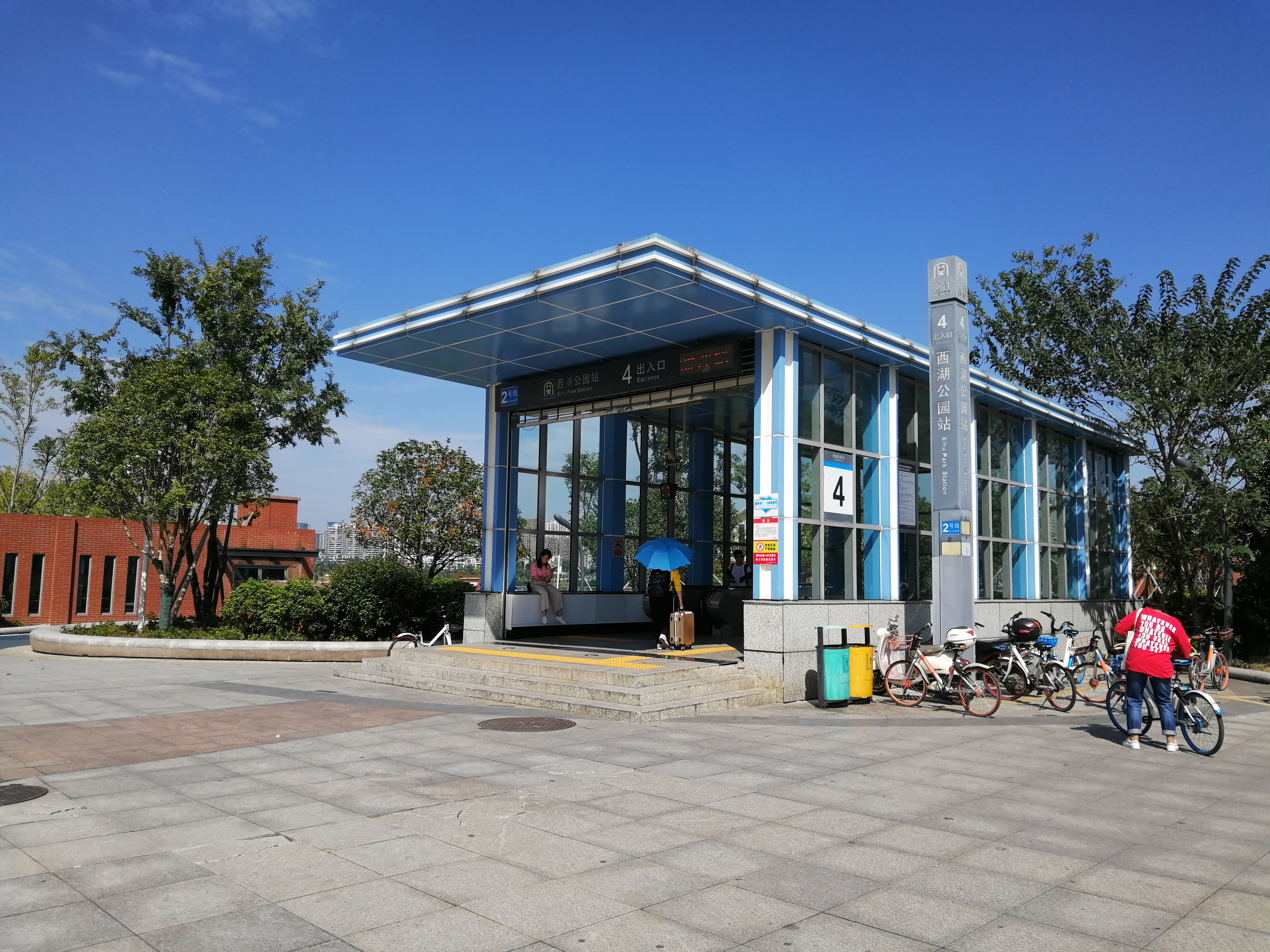

General information
- Location: Yuelu District, Changsha, Hunan; China
- Operated by: Changsha Metro
- Line(s): Line 2
- Platforms: 1 island platform

Other information
- Station code: 207

History
- Opened: 29 April 2014

Services
Preceding station	Changsha Metro	Following station
Jinxing Road towards West Meixi Lake	Line 2	Yingwanzhen towards Guangda

Xihu Park station is a subway station in Changsha, Hunan, China, operated by the Changsha subway operator Changsha Metro.

== Station layout ==
The station has one island platform.

G		Exits
LG1	Concourse	Faregates, Station Agent
LG2	←	Line 2 towards West Meixi Lake (Jinxing Road)
LG2	Island platform, doors open on the left
LG2		Line 2 towards Guangda (Yingwanzhen)	→

== History ==
The station opened on 29 April 2014.

== Surrounding area ==
- Xihu Park, it has an area of about 2400 mu (Chinese:西湖公园).
