= Changsha railway station =

Railway station in Changsha, China

Coordinates: 28°09′01″N 113°03′32″E

Changsha 长沙
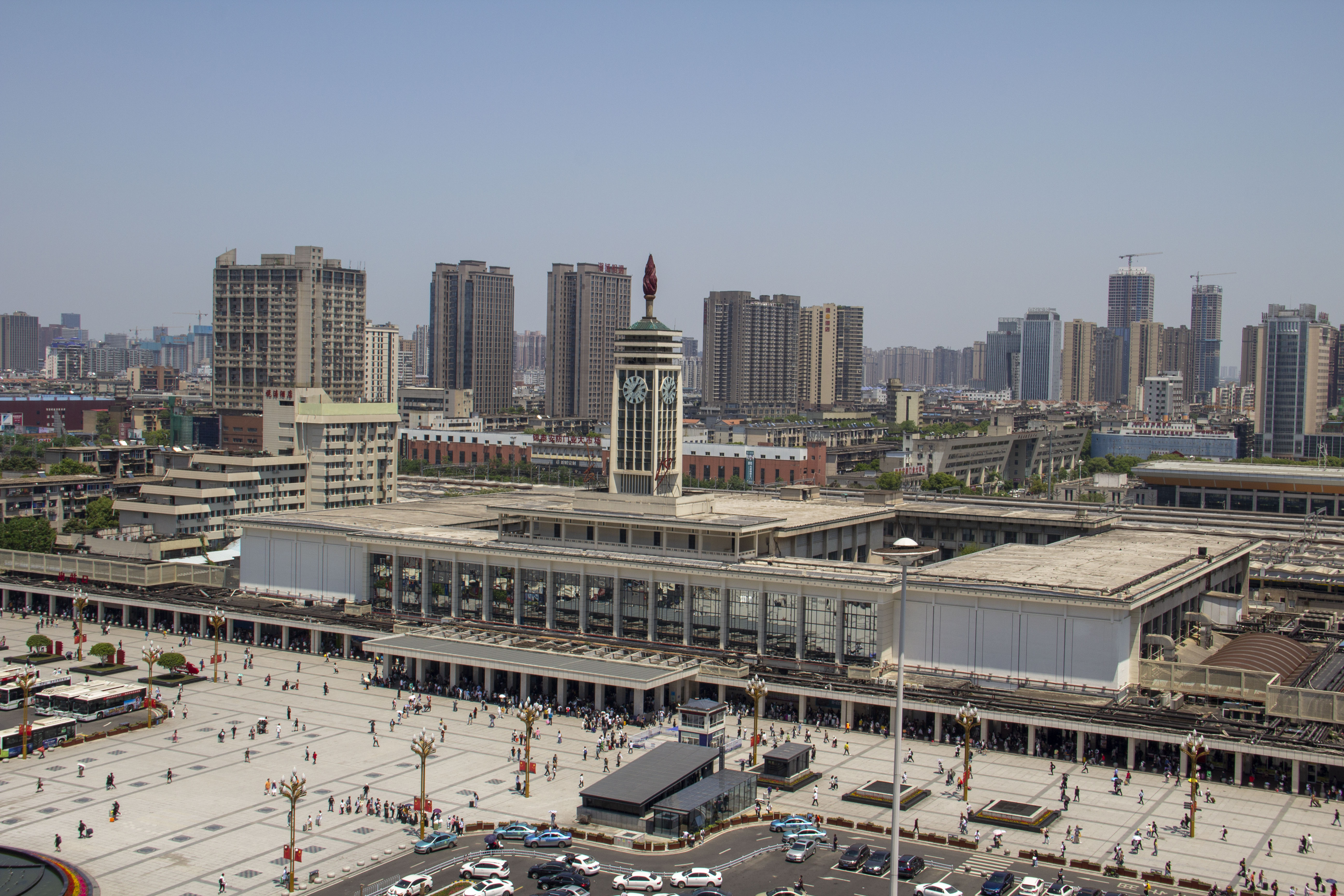
- Changsha railway station in May 2021

General information
- Location: Furong District, Changsha, Hunan; China
- Operated by: China Railway Guangzhou Group
- Lines: Beijing–Guangzhou railway; Shimen-Changsha railway
- Platforms: 4

Other information
- Station code: TMIS code: 22874; Telegraph code: CSQ; Pinyin code: CSH
- Classification: Class 1 station

History
- Opened: 1912; 114 years ago

Services
Preceding station	China Railway	Following station
Miluo towards Beijing or Beijing West	Beijing–Guangzhou railway	Zhuzhou towards Guangzhou
Ningxiang towards Shimenxian North	Shimen–Changsha railway	Terminus
Wuchang towards Beijing West	Beijing–Nanning–Hanoi	Hengyang towards Gia Lâm
Route map
Location

Changsha railway station (simplified Chinese: 长沙站; traditional Chinese: 長沙站; pinyin: Chángshā zhàn) is a railway station and a metro station on the Beijing–Guangzhou railway and the Changsha–Zhuzhou–Xiangtan intercity railway. The station is located in Furong District, Changsha, Hunan, China. The station is served by Changsha Metro Line 2 and Line 3.

== History ==
The station opened in 1911. By 1947, the station had been refurbished twice due to the Chinese Civil War.

In 1967, a new passenger rail station, Changshaxin station, was constructed along the Beijing–Guangzhou line in order to relieve congestion at Changsha station. However, the traffic capacity of the station is still insufficient to meet the demand at the original Changsha station. As a result, the Ministry of Railways and Guangzhou Railway Administration decided that a new station building is to be built west of Changshaxin station. Construction for the new station began in 1975 and it opened on 30 June 1977, with the former station being demolished.

== Services ==
=== China Railway ===
Changsha railway station is a railway station in Furong District, Changsha, Hunan, China, operated by CR Guangzhou Group. It opened its services on 1912.

=== Changsha Metro ===
Railway Station 长沙火车站
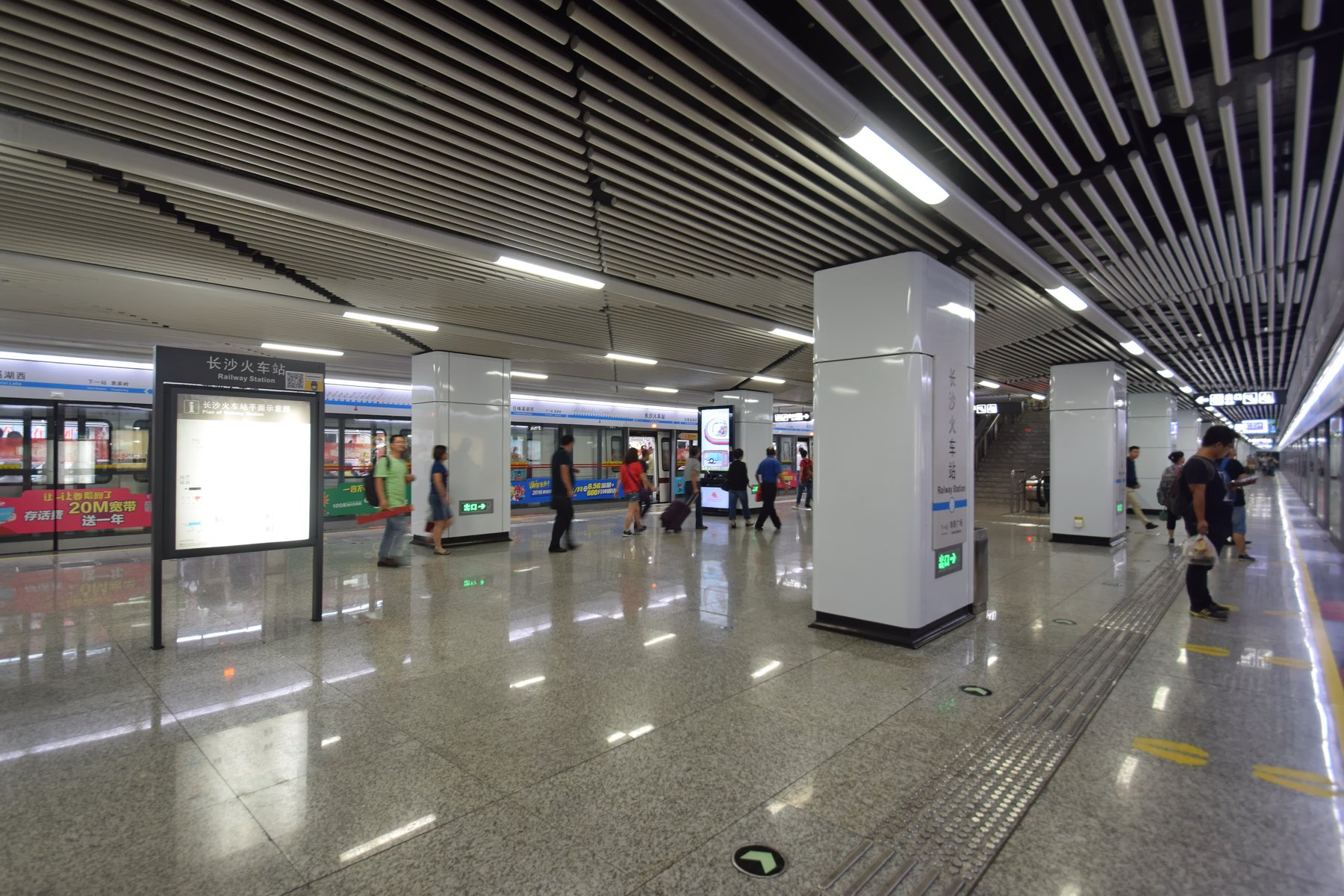
- Line 2 platform

General information
- Location: Furong District, Changsha, Hunan; China
- Operated by: Changsha Metro
- Lines: Line 2 Line 3
- Platforms: 4 (2 island platforms)

Other information
- Station code: 215

History
- Opened: 29 April 2014; 11 years ago (Line 2); 28 June 2020; 5 years ago (Line 3)

Services
Preceding station	Changsha Metro	Following station
Yuanjialing towards West Meixi Lake	Line 2	Jintai Square towards Guangda
Chaoyangcun towards Xiangtan North Railway Station	Line 3	East Martyrs Park towards Guangsheng
Location

Railway Station is a metro station in Furong District, Changsha, Hunan, China, operated by the Changsha subway operator Changsha Metro. It opened its services on 29 April 2014. It is served by Line 2 and Line 3.

=== Layout ===
G		Exits
LG1	Concourse	Faregates, Station Agent
LG2	←	Line 2 towards West Meixi Lake (Yuanjialing)
LG2	Island platform, doors open on the left
LG2		Line 2 towards Guangda (Jintai Square)	→
LG3	←	Line 3 towards Guangsheng (East Martyrs Park)
LG3	Island platform, doors open on the left
LG3		Line 3 towards Xiangtan North railway station (Chaoyangcun)	→
