= Shawan Park station =

Subway station in Changsha, Hunan

Shawan Park 沙湾公园
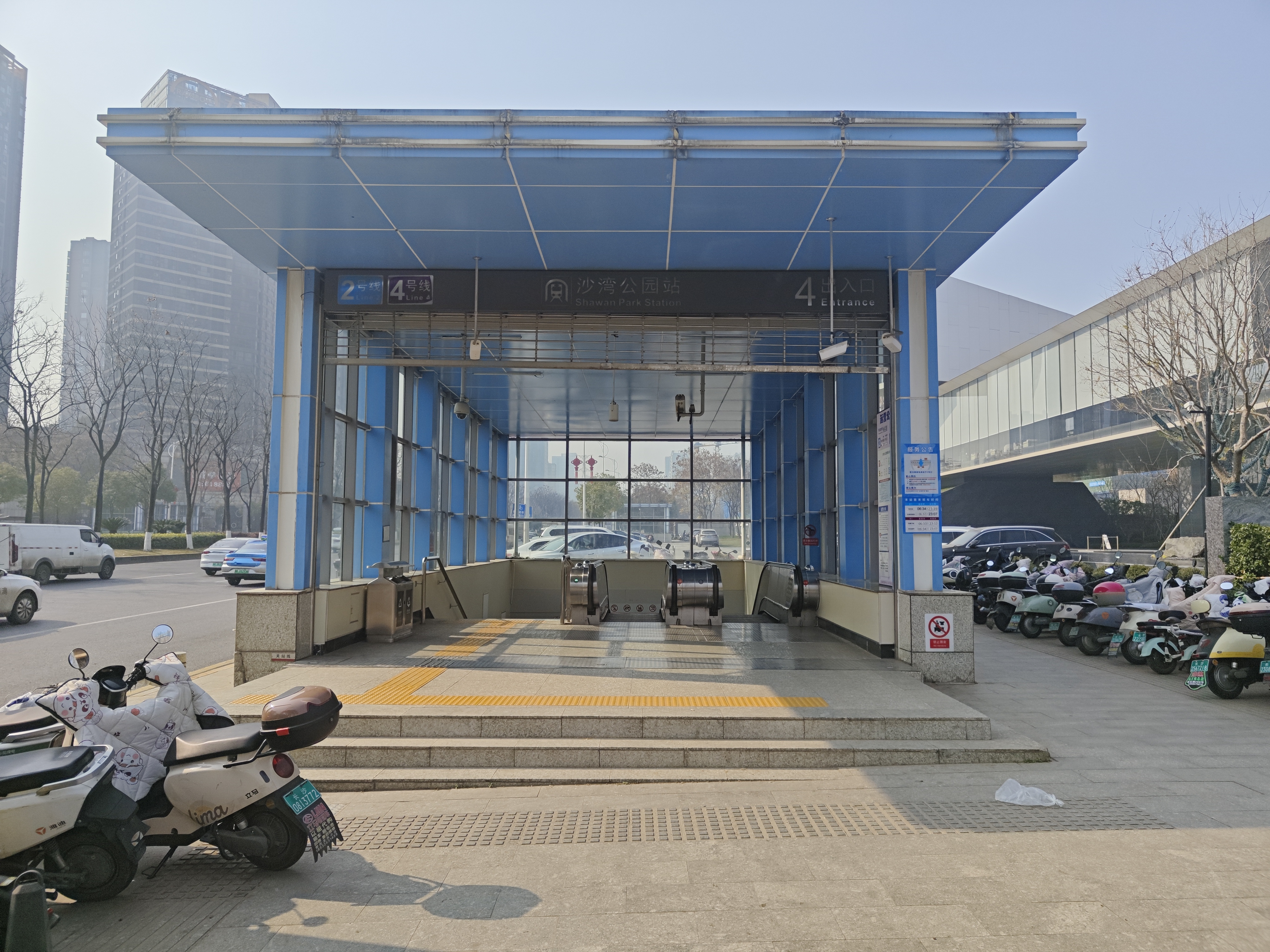
- Entrance 4

General information
- Location: Yuhua District, Changsha, Hunan; China
- Coordinates: 28°09′50″N 113°03′03″E
- Operated by: Changsha Metro
- Lines: Line 2 Line 4
- Platforms: 1 island platform

Other information
- Station code: 220

History
- Opened: 29 April 2014

Services
Preceding station	Changsha Metro	Following station
Changsha Avenue towards West Meixi Lake	Line 2	Duhua Road towards Guangda
Guitang towards Guanziling	Line 4	Sutang towards Dujiaping
Location

Shawan Park station (simplified Chinese: 沙湾公园; traditional Chinese: 沙灣公園; pinyin: Shāwān Gōngyuán) is a subway station in Changsha, Hunan, operated by the Changsha subway operator Changsha Metro.

== Station layout ==
The station has one island platform.

G		Exits
LG1	Concourse	Faregates, Station Agent
LG2		← Line 2 towards West Meixi Lake (Changsha Avenue)
LG2	Island platform, doors open on the left
LG2		Line 2 towards Guangda (Duhua Road) →
LG3		← Line 4 towards Guanziling (Guitang)
LG3	Island platform, doors open on the left
LG3		→ Line 4 towards Dujiaping (Sutang)

== History ==
The station opened on 29 April 2014.

== Surrounding area ==
- Shawan Park
- The Gym of Hunan Province
- Hunan Sports Vocational College
