= Furong Square station =

Metro station in Changsha, China

Coordinates: 28°12′02″N 112°59′27″E

Furong Square 芙蓉广场
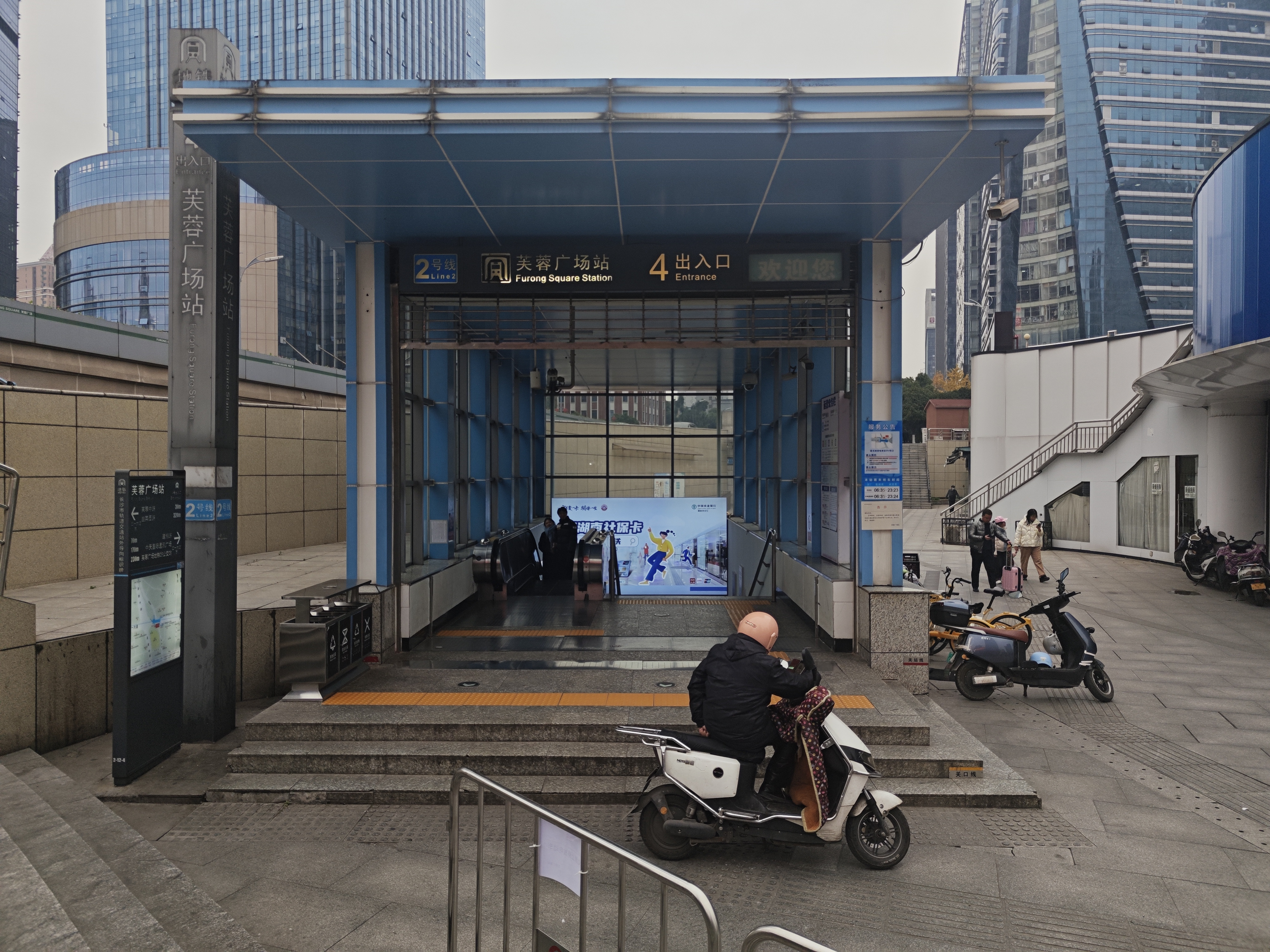
- Entrance 4

General information
- Location: Furong District, Changsha, Hunan; China
- Operated by: Changsha Metro
- Line: Line 2
- Platforms: 1 island platform

Other information
- Station code: 212

History
- Opened: 29 April 2014

Services
Preceding station	Changsha Metro	Following station
Wuyi Square towards West Meixi Lake	Line 2	Yingbin Road towards Guangda
Location

Furong Square station is a subway station in Changsha, Hunan, China, operated by the Changsha subway operator Changsha Metro. Its No.4 exit is just located a few meters away from the entrance of Carrefour.

== Station layout ==
The station has one island platform.

G		Exits
LG1	Concourse	Faregates, Station Agent
LG2	Devices	Device Storage
LG3	←	Line 2 towards West Meixi Lake (Wuyi Square)
LG3	Island platform, doors open on the left
LG3		Line 2 towards Guangda (Yingbin Road)	→

== History ==
The station opened on 29 April 2014.

== Surrounding area ==
- Xinhua Book Store (Chinese: 新华书店)
- Carrefour (Chinese: 家乐福)
