= Wanjiali Square station =

Subway station in Changsha, Hunan, China

Coordinates: 28°11′52″N 113°02′13″E

Wanjiali Square 万家丽广场
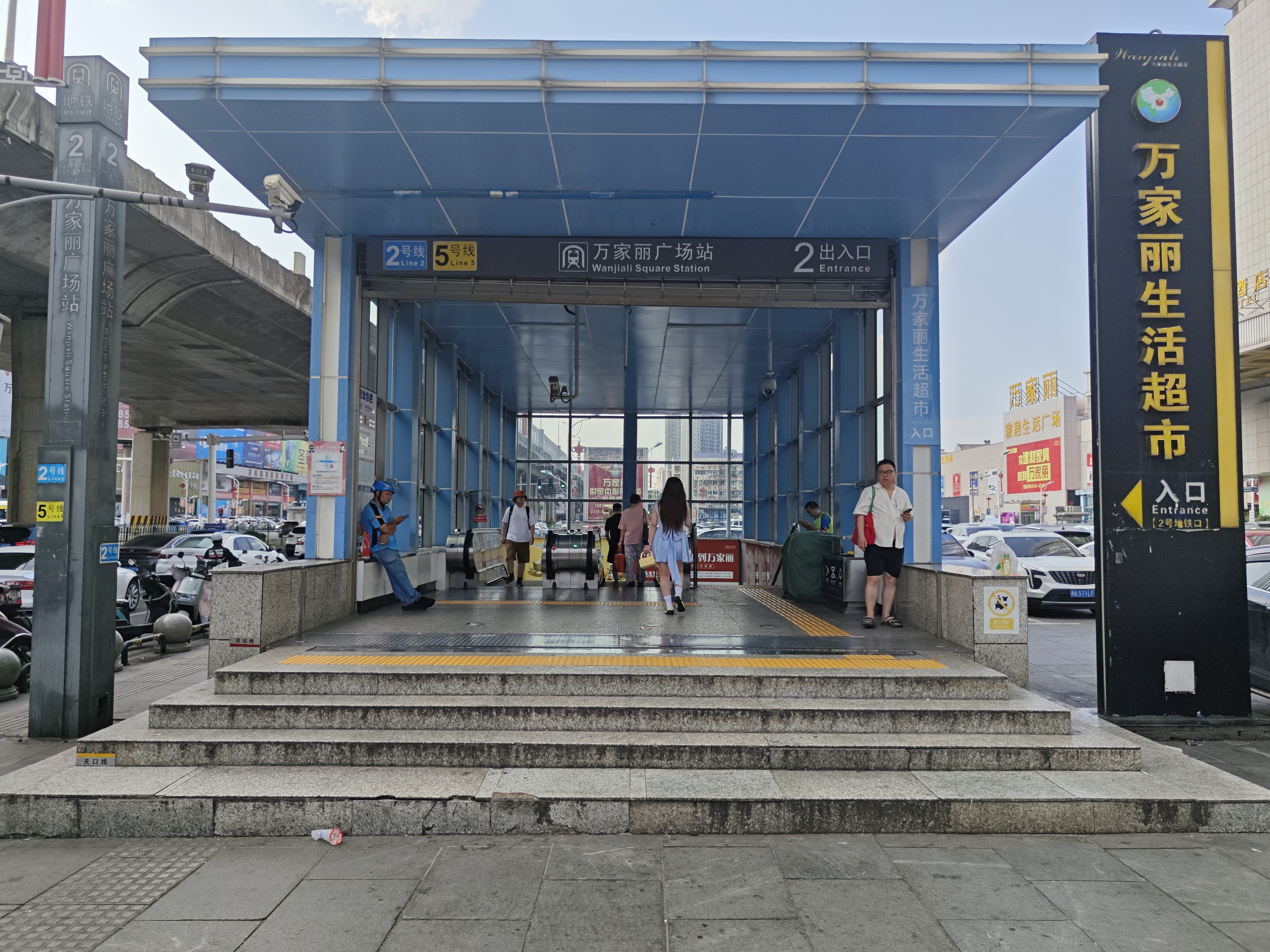

General information
- Location: Furong District, Changsha, Hunan; China
- Operated by: Changsha Metro
- Lines: Line 2 Line 5
- Platforms: 4 (2 island platforms)

Other information
- Station code: 217

History
- Opened: 29 April 2014

Services
Preceding station	Changsha Metro	Following station
Jintai Square towards West Meixi Lake	Line 2	Renmin East Road towards Guangda
Furong District Government towards Maozhutang	Line 5	Mawangdui towards Shuiduhe
Location

Wanjiali Square station is a subway station in Changsha, Hunan, China, operated by the Changsha subway operator Changsha Metro.

== Station layout ==
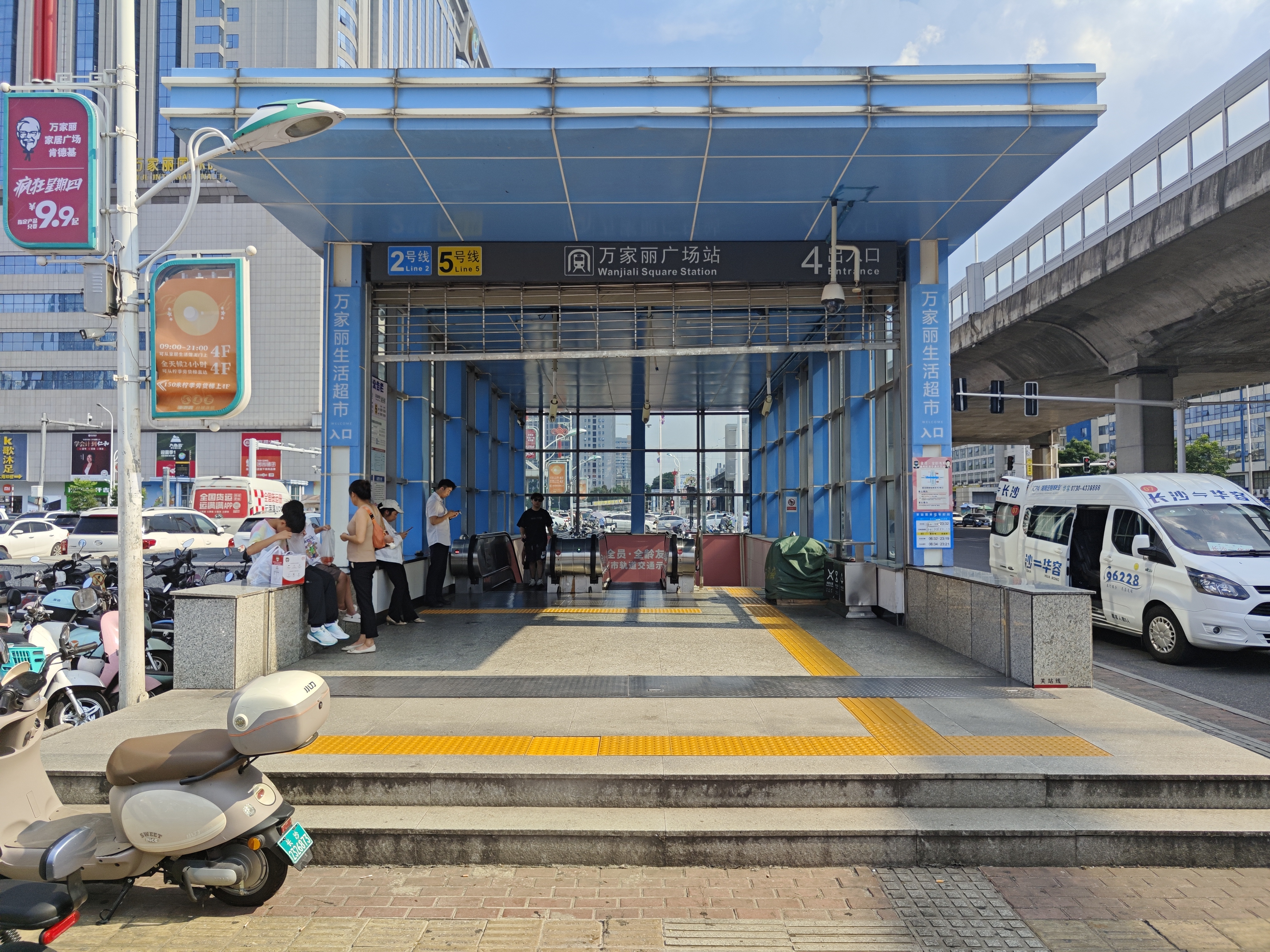
Entrance 4

The station has one island platform.

G		Exits
LG1	Concourse	Faregates, Station Agent
LG2	←	Line 2 towards West Meixi Lake (Jintai Square)
LG2	Island platform, doors open on the left
LG2		Line 2 towards Guangda (Renmin East Road)	→
LG3	←	Line 5 towards Shuiduhe (Mawangdui)
LG3	Island platform, doors open on the left
LG3		Line 5 towards Maozhutang (Furong District Government)	→

== History ==
The station opened on 29 April 2014.

== Surrounding area ==
- Wanjiali Square
