= Yuanjialing station =

Metro station in Changsha, China

Coordinates: 28°12′01″N 113°00′26″E

Yuanjialing 袁家岭
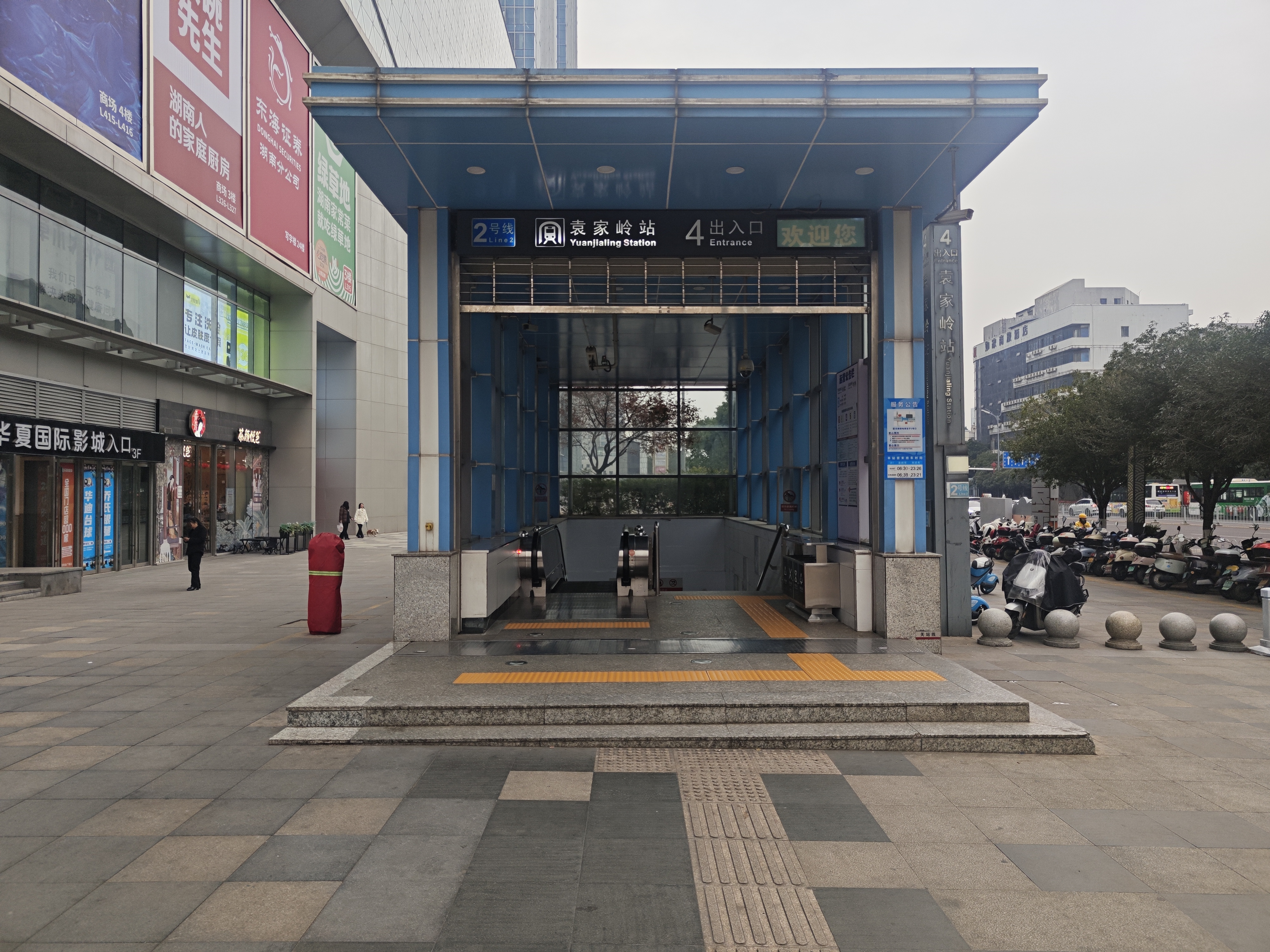
- Station entrance 4.

General information
- Location: Furong District, Changsha, Hunan; China
- Operated by: Changsha Metro
- Line: Line 2
- Platforms: 1 island platform

Other information
- Station code: 214

History
- Opened: 29 April 2014

Services
Preceding station	Changsha Metro	Following station
Yingbin Road towards West Meixi Lake	Line 2	Railway Station towards Guangda
Location

Yuanjialing station is a subway station in Changsha, Hunan, China, operated by the Changsha subway operator Changsha Metro.

== Station layout ==
The station has one island platform.

G		Exits
LG1	Concourse	Faregates, Station Agent
LG2	←	Line 2 towards West Meixi Lake (Yingbin Road)
LG2	Island platform, doors open on the left
LG2		Line 2 towards Guangda (Railway Station)	→

== History ==
The station opened on 29 April 2014.

== Surrounding area ==
- The Eighth Hospital of Changsha
