= Duhua Road station =

Metro station in Changsha, China

Coordinates: 28°09′09″N 113°03′47″E

Duhua Road 杜花路
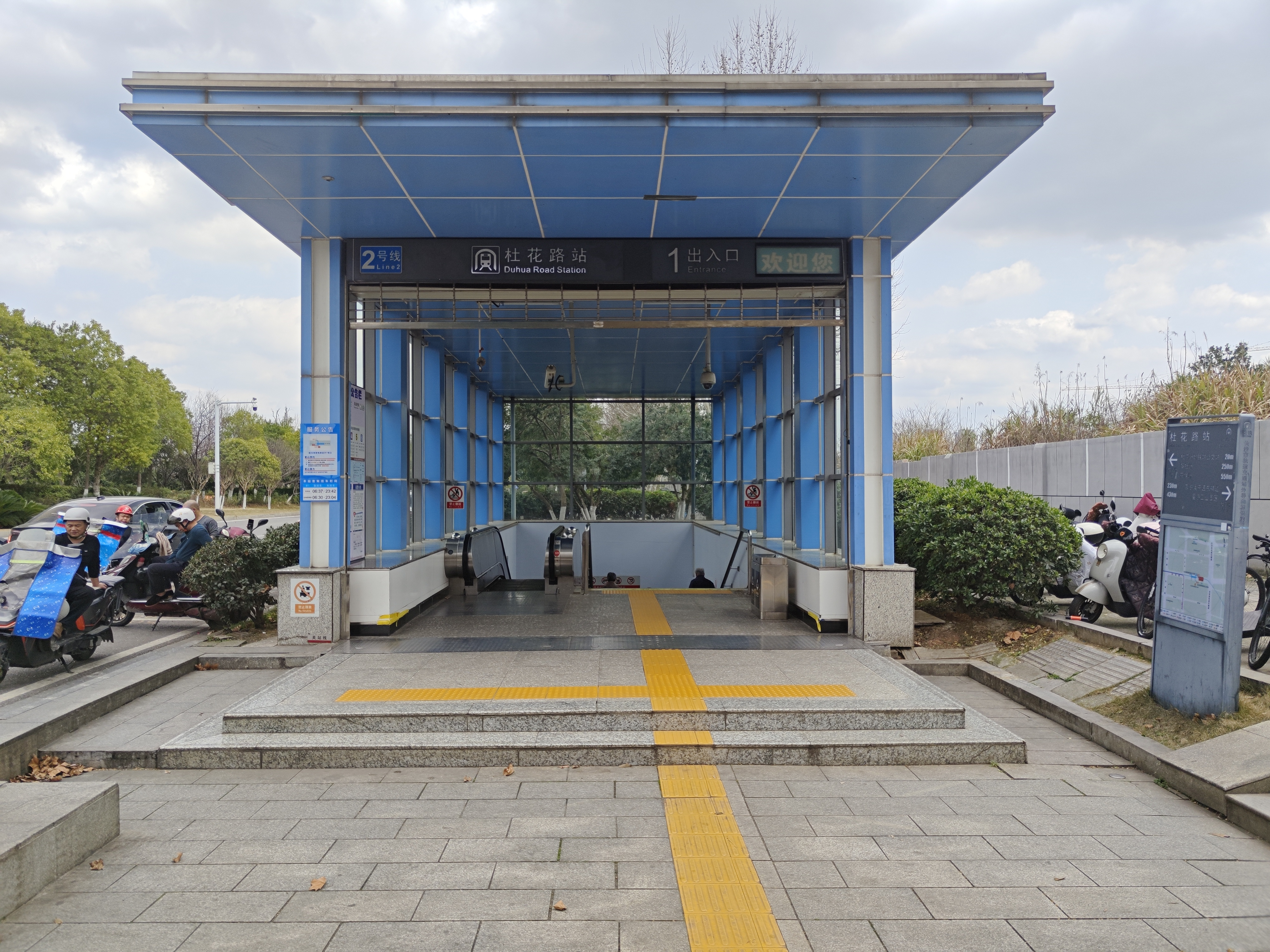
- Entrance 1

General information
- Location: Yuhua District, Changsha, Hunan; China
- Operated by: Changsha Metro
- Line: Line 2
- Platforms: 1 island platform

Other information
- Station code: 221

History
- Opened: 29 April 2014

Services
Preceding station	Changsha Metro	Following station
Shawan Park towards West Meixi Lake	Line 2	South Railway Station towards Guangda
Location

Duhua Road station is a subway station in Changsha, Hunan, China, operated by the Changsha subway operator Changsha Metro.

== Station layout ==
The station has one island platform.

G		Exits
LG1	Concourse	Faregates, Station Agent
LG2	←	Line 2 towards West Meixi Lake (Shawan Park)
LG2	Island platform, doors open on the left
LG2		Line 2 towards Guangda (South Railway Station)	→

== History ==
The station opened on 29 April 2014.

== Surrounding area ==
- Nanya High School
- The Government of Yuhua District
