= Wuyi Square station =

Metro station in Changsha, China

Wuyi Square 五一广场
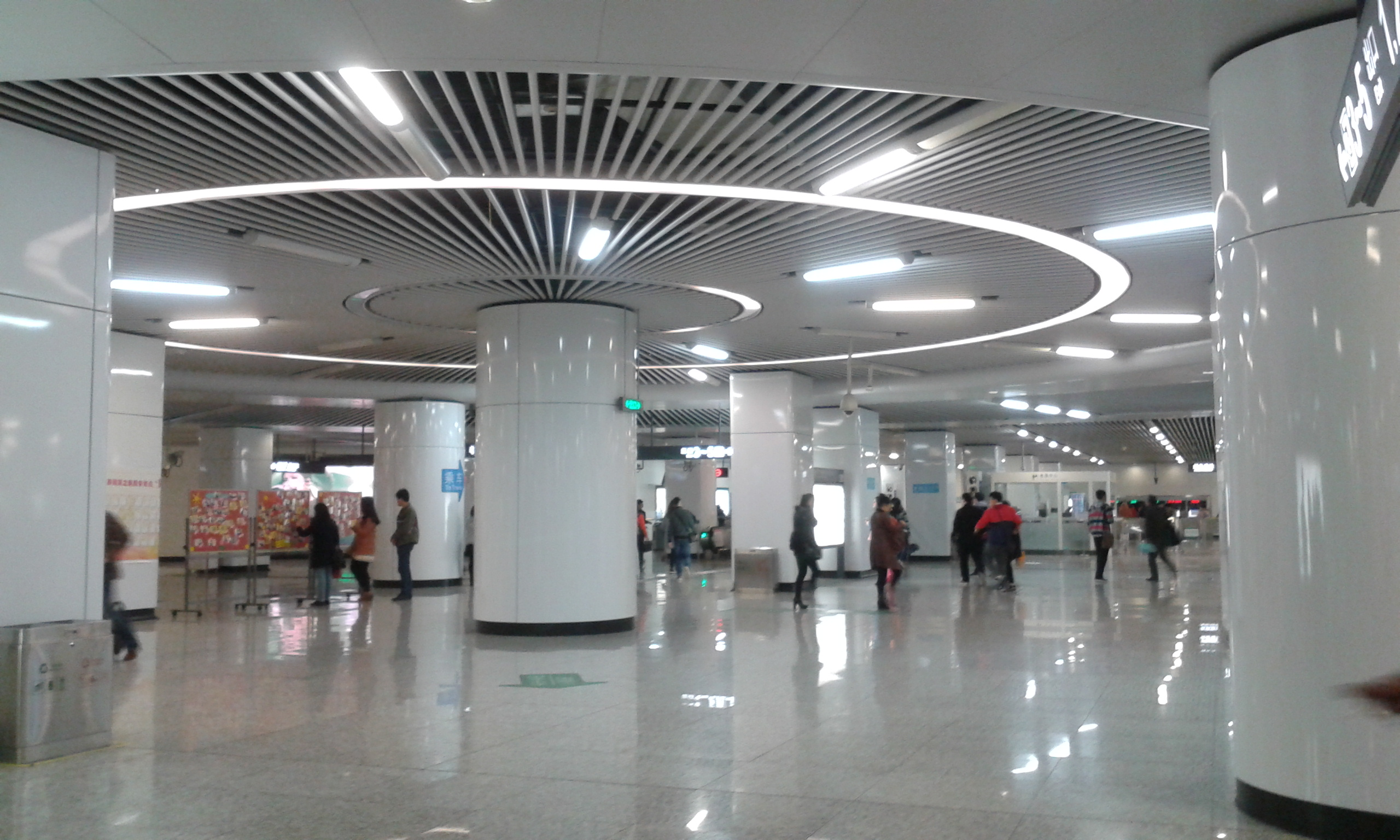
- Concourse

General information
- Location: Huangxing Road (M) × Wuyi Avenue; Furong District, Changsha, Hunan; China
- Coordinates: 28°12′N 112°58′E
- System: Changsha metro station
- Operator: Changsha Metro
- Lines: Line 1 Line 2
- Platforms: 2 side platforms (Line 1); 1 island platform (Line 2)

History
- Opened: 29 April 2014; 12 years ago (Line 2); 28 June 2016; 10 years ago (Line 1)

Services
Preceding station	Changsha Metro	Following station
Peiyuanqiao towards Jinpenqiu	Line 1	Huangxing Square towards Shangshuangtang
Xiangjiang Middle Road towards West Meixi Lake	Line 2	Furong Square towards Guangda
Location

Wuyi Square station is a subway station in Changsha, Hunan, China, operated by the Changsha subway operator Changsha Metro.

== Station layout ==
The station has two side platforms for Line 1 and one island platform for Line 2.

=== Floors ===
G		Exits
LG1	Concourse	Faregates, Station Agent, ATM
LG2	Transfer	To transfer between Line 1 and Line 2
LG2	Side platform, doors open on the right
LG2	←	Line 1 towards Jinpenqiu (Peiyuanqiao)
LG2		Line 1 towards Shangshuangtang (Huangxing Square)	→
LG2	Side platform, doors open on the right
LG2	Transfer	To transfer Line 1 and Line 2
LG3	←	Line 2 towards West Meixi Lake (Xiangjiang Middle Road)
LG3	Island platform, doors open on the left
LG3		Line 2 towards Guangda (Furong Square)	→

=== Entrance ===
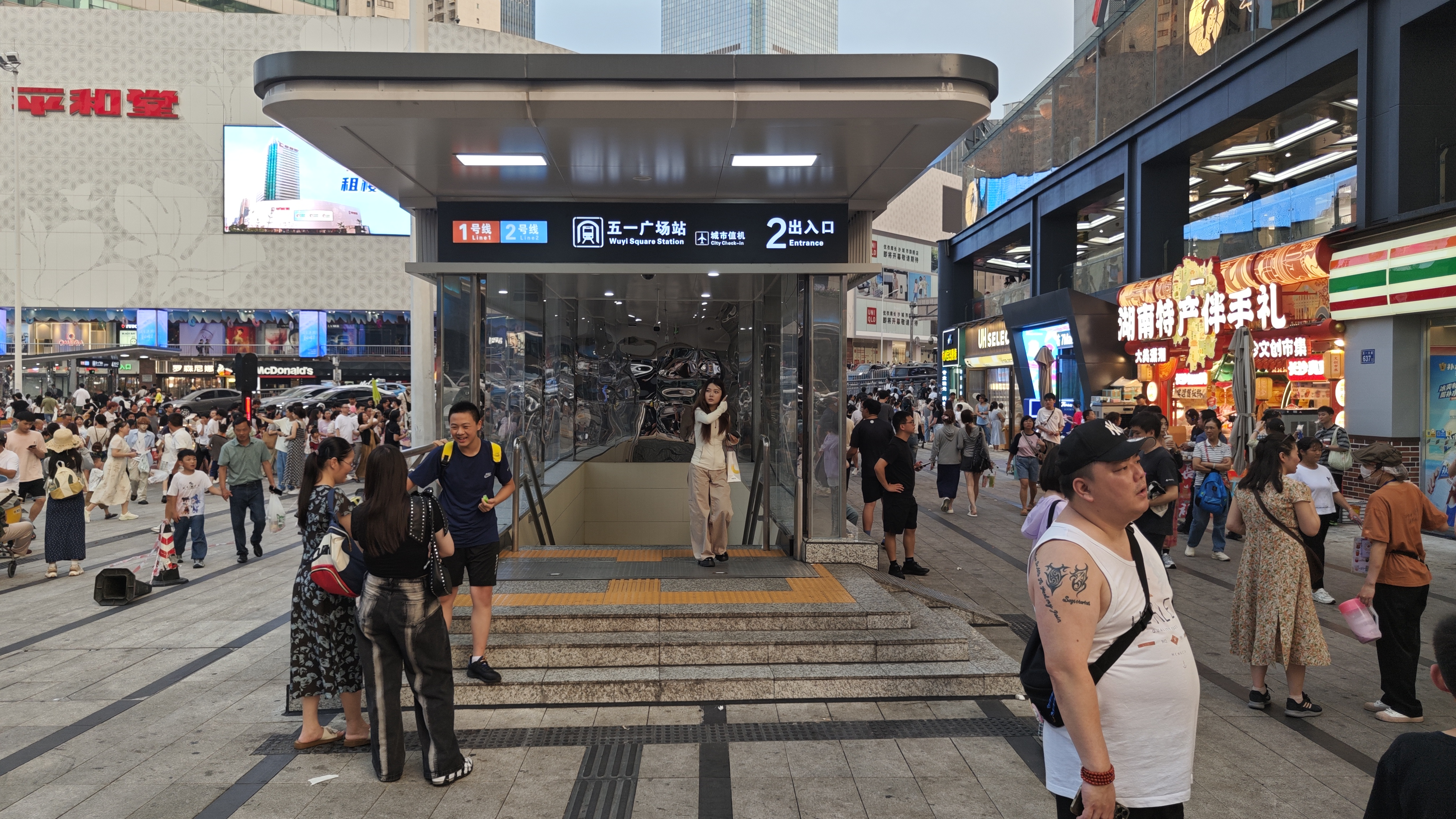
Entrance 2

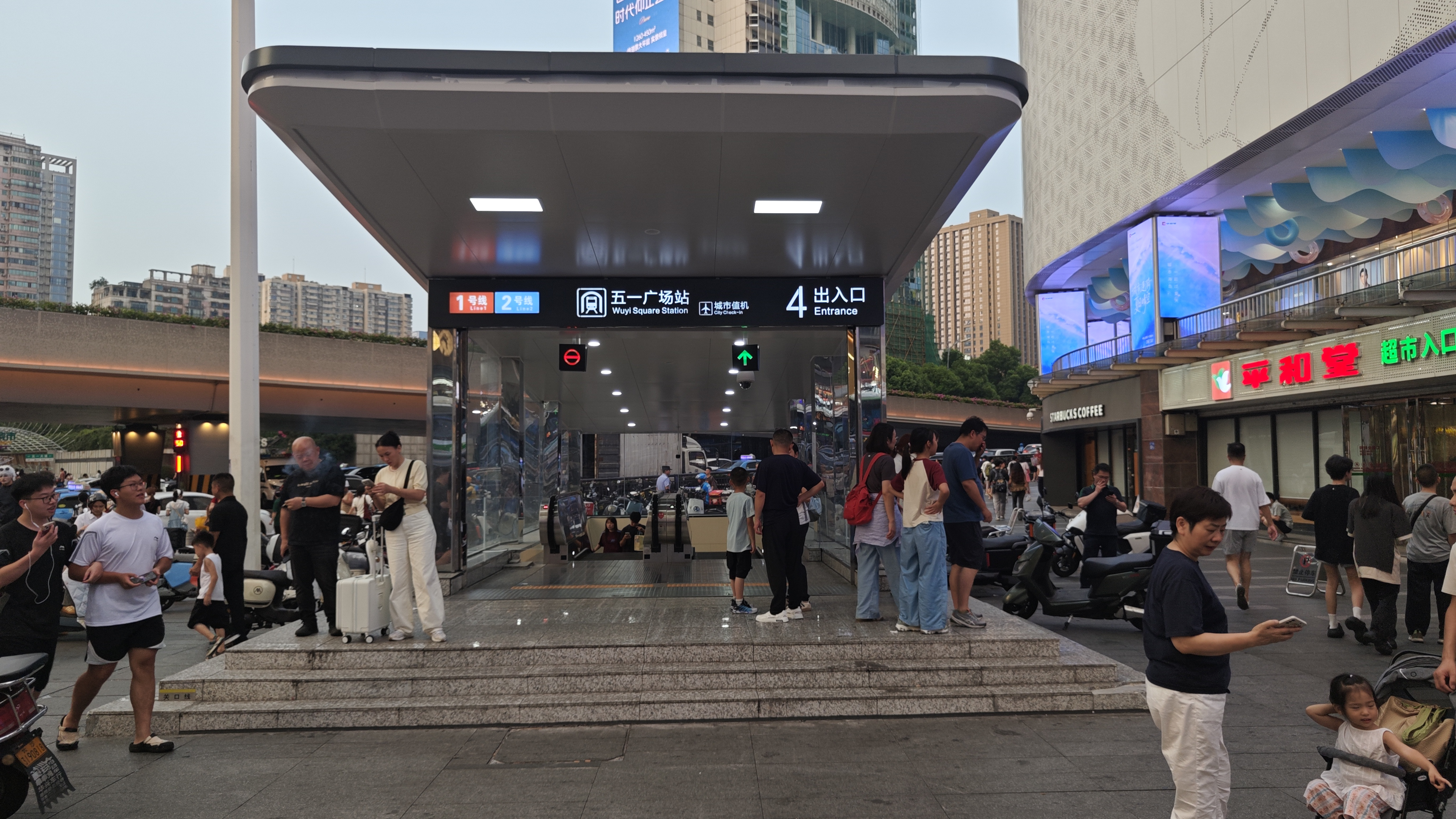
Entrance 4

== History ==
The station opened on 29 April 2014.

== Surrounding area ==
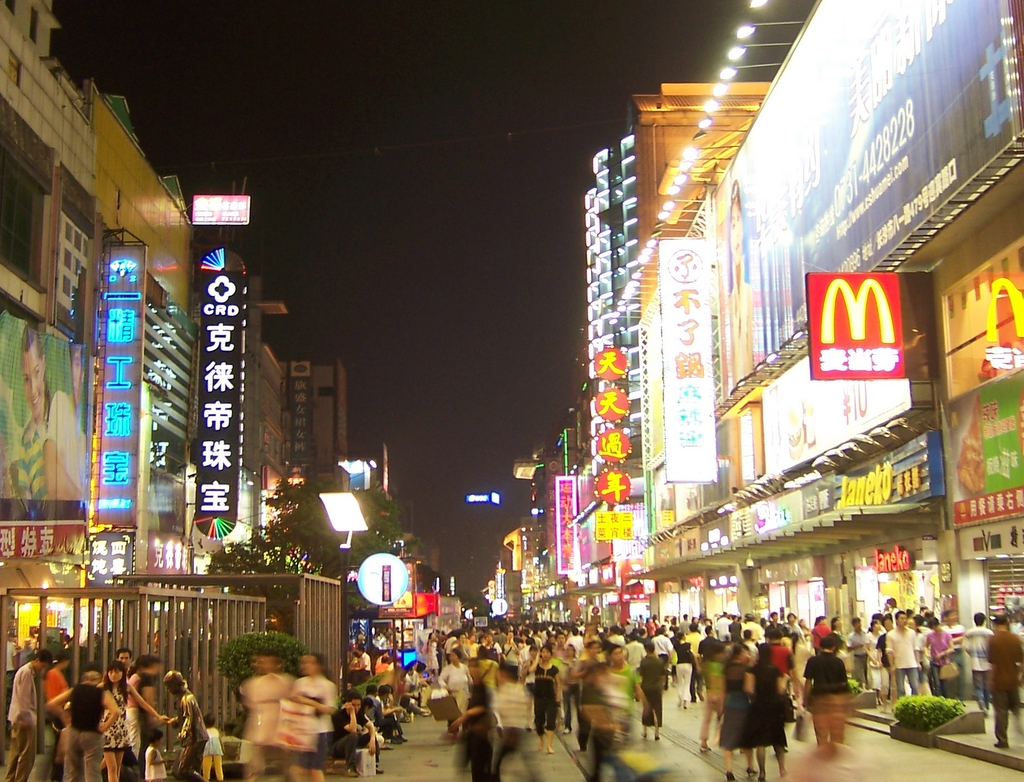
The Huángxīng Lù Commercial Pedestrian Street in Changsha.

- Changsha Pedestrian Street (Chinese: 长沙步行街)
- Heiwado Department Store (Chinese: 平和堂商贸大厦)
- Crowne Plaza (Chinese: 皇冠假日酒店)
