= Yingbin Road station =

Subway station in Changsha, China

Coordinates: 28°12′02″N 112°59′52″E

Yingbin Road 迎宾路口
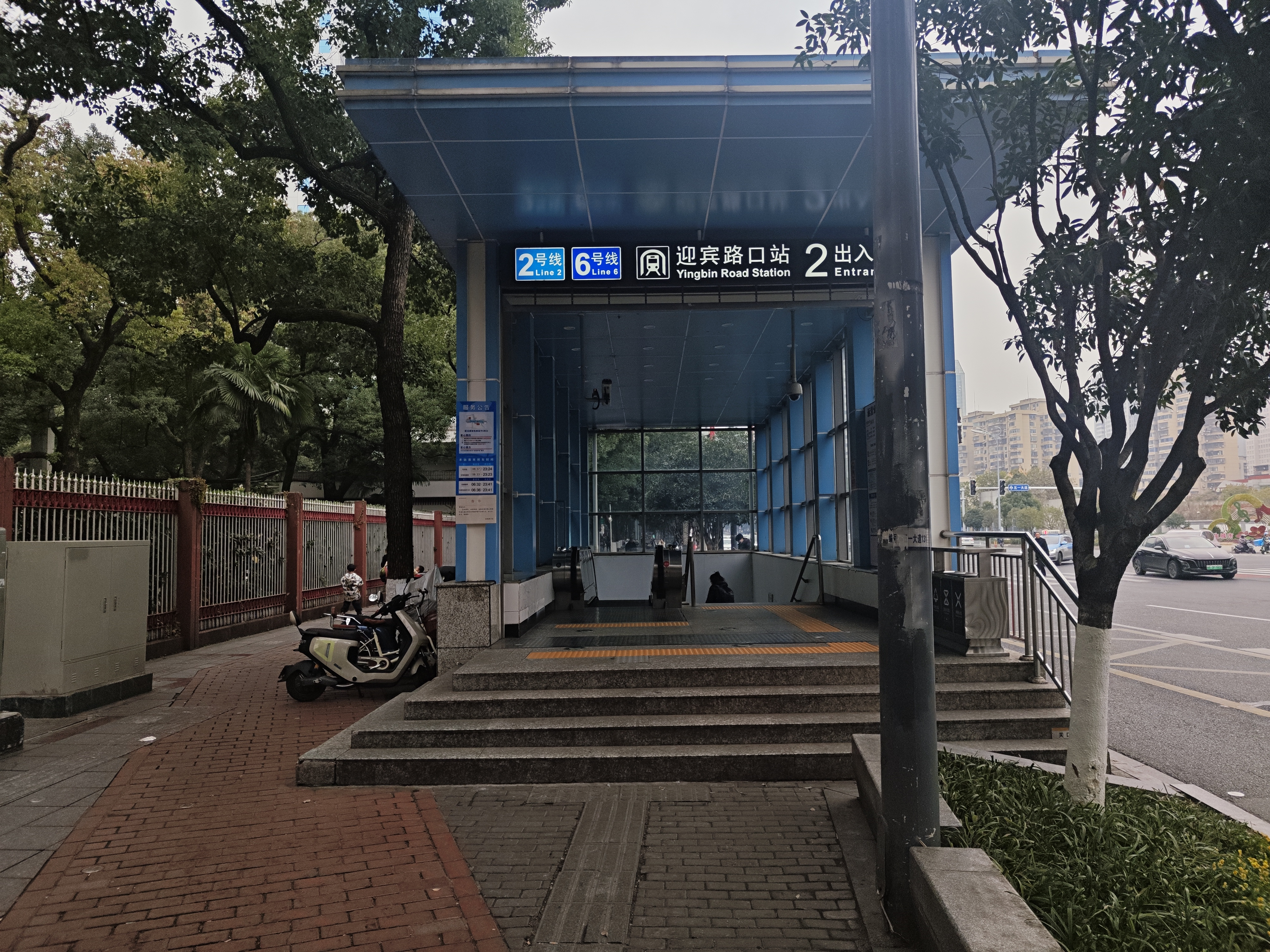
- Entrance 2

General information
- Location: Furong District, Changsha, Hunan; China
- Operator: Changsha Metro
- Lines: Line 2 Line 6
- Platforms: 4 (2 island platforms)

Other information
- Station code: 213

History
- Opened: 29 April 2014 (Line 2); 28 June 2022 (Line 6)

Services
| Preceding station | Changsha Metro | Following station |
|---|---|---|
| Furong Square towards Longhuling | Line 2 | Yuanjialing towards Guangda |
| South Martyrs Park towards Xiejiaqiao | Line 6 | Yaoling & The Second Xiangya Hospital towards Huanghua Airport T1 & T2 |
Location

Yingbin Road station is a subway station in Changsha, Hunan, China, operated by the Changsha subway operator Changsha Metro.

== Station layout ==
The station has two island platforms.

| G | | Exits |
| LG1 | Concourse | Faregates, Station Agent |
| LG2 | ← | Line 2 towards West Meixi Lake (Furong Square) |
| LG2 | Island platform, doors open on the left |
| LG2 | | Line 2 towards Guangda (Yuanjialing) | → |
| LG3 | ← | Line 6 towards Xiejiaqiao (South Martyrs Park) |
| LG3 | Island platform, doors open on the left |
| LG3 | | Line 6 towards Huanghua Airport T1 & T2 (Yaoling & The Second Xiangya Hospital) | → |

== History ==
The station opened on 29 April 2014. It later became an interchange station after the opening of Line 6 on 28 June 2022.

== Surrounding area ==
- Changsha Postal Service
