= Jintai Square station =

Metro station in Changsha, China

Coordinates: 28°11′53″N 113°01′29″E

Jintai Square 锦泰广场
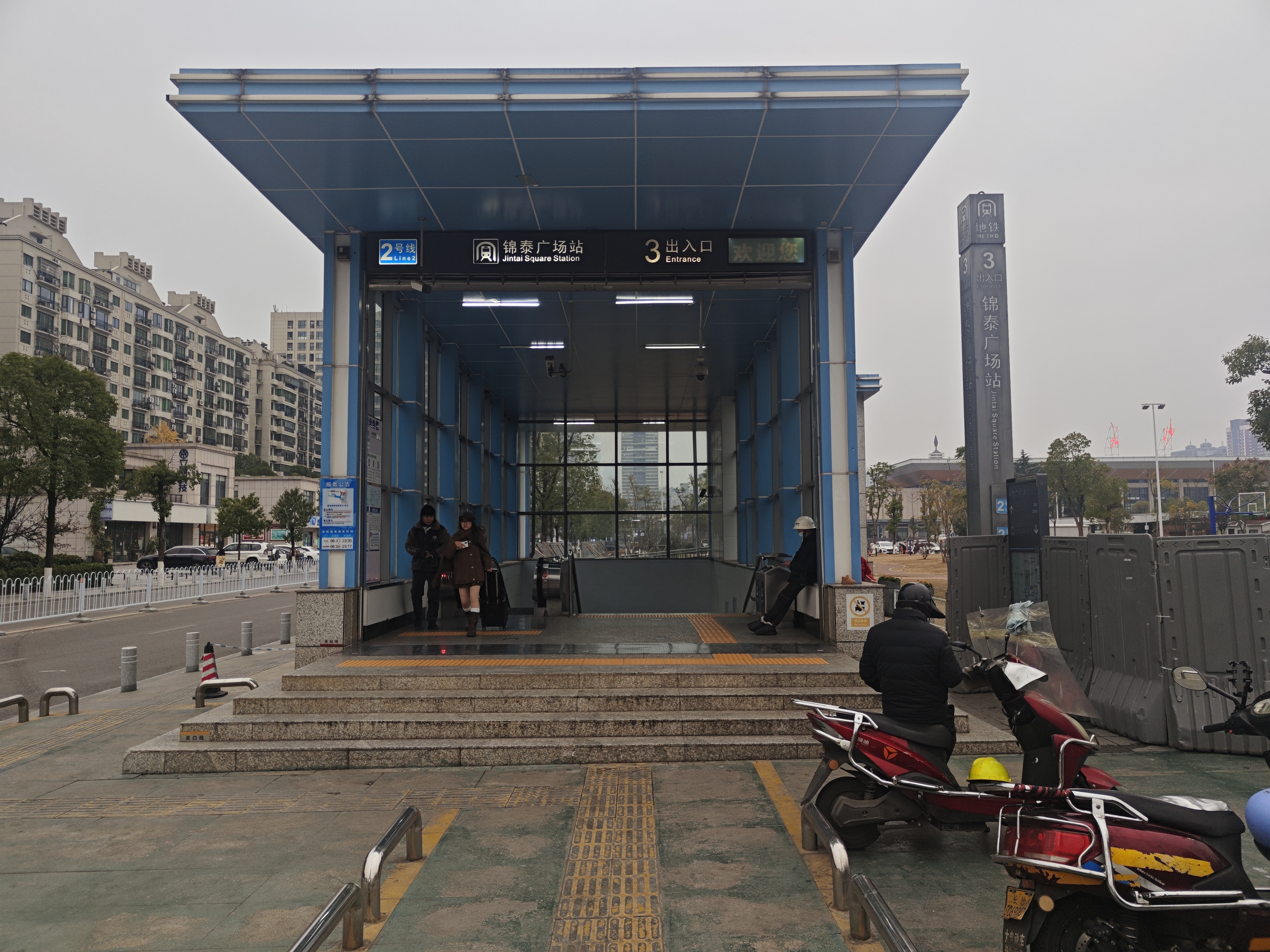
- Entrance 3

General information
- Location: Furong District, Changsha, Hunan; China
- Operated by: Changsha Metro
- Line: Line 2
- Platforms: 1 island platform

Other information
- Station code: 216

History
- Opened: 29 April 2014

Services
Preceding station	Changsha Metro	Following station
Railway Station towards West Meixi Lake	Line 2	Wanjiali Square towards Guangda
Location

Jintai Square station is a subway station in Changsha, Hunan, China, operated by the Changsha subway operator Changsha Metro.

== Station layout ==
The station has one island platform.

G		Exits
LG1	Concourse	Faregates, Station Agent
LG2	←	Line 2 towards West Meixi Lake (Railway Station)
LG2	Island platform, doors open on the left
LG2		Line 2 towards Guangda (Wanjiali Square)	→

== History ==
The station opened on 29 April 2014.

== Surrounding area ==
- Changsha Taikang Pet Hospital
