= Xiangjiang Middle Road station =

Metro station in Changsha, China

Coordinates: 28°12′04″N 112°58′33″E

Xiangjiang Middle Road 湘江中路
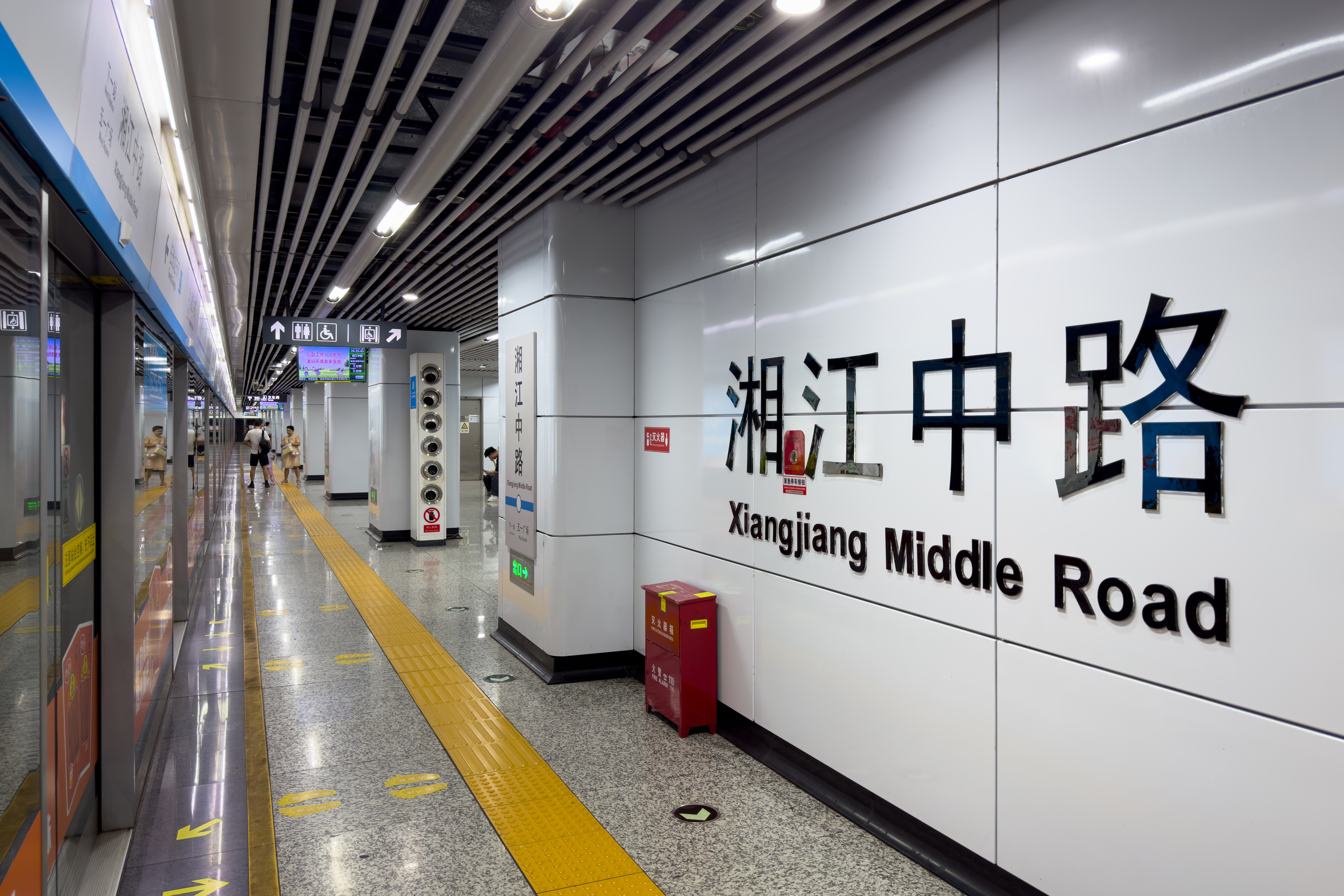

General information
- Location: Tianxin District, Changsha, Hunan; China
- Operated by: Changsha Metro
- Line: Line 2
- Platforms: 1 island platform

Other information
- Station code: 210

History
- Opened: 29 April 2014

Services
Preceding station	Changsha Metro	Following station
Juzizhou towards West Meixi Lake	Line 2	Wuyi Square towards Guangda
Location

Xiangjiang Middle Road station is a subway station in Changsha, Hunan, China, operated by the Changsha subway operator Changsha Metro.

== Station layout ==
The station has one island platform.

G		Exits
LG1	Concourse	Faregates, Station Agent
LG2	←	Line 2 towards West Meixi Lake (Juzizhou)
LG2	Island platform, doors open on the left
LG2		Line 2 towards Guangda (Wuyi Square)	→

== History ==
The station opened on 29 April 2014.

== Surrounding area ==
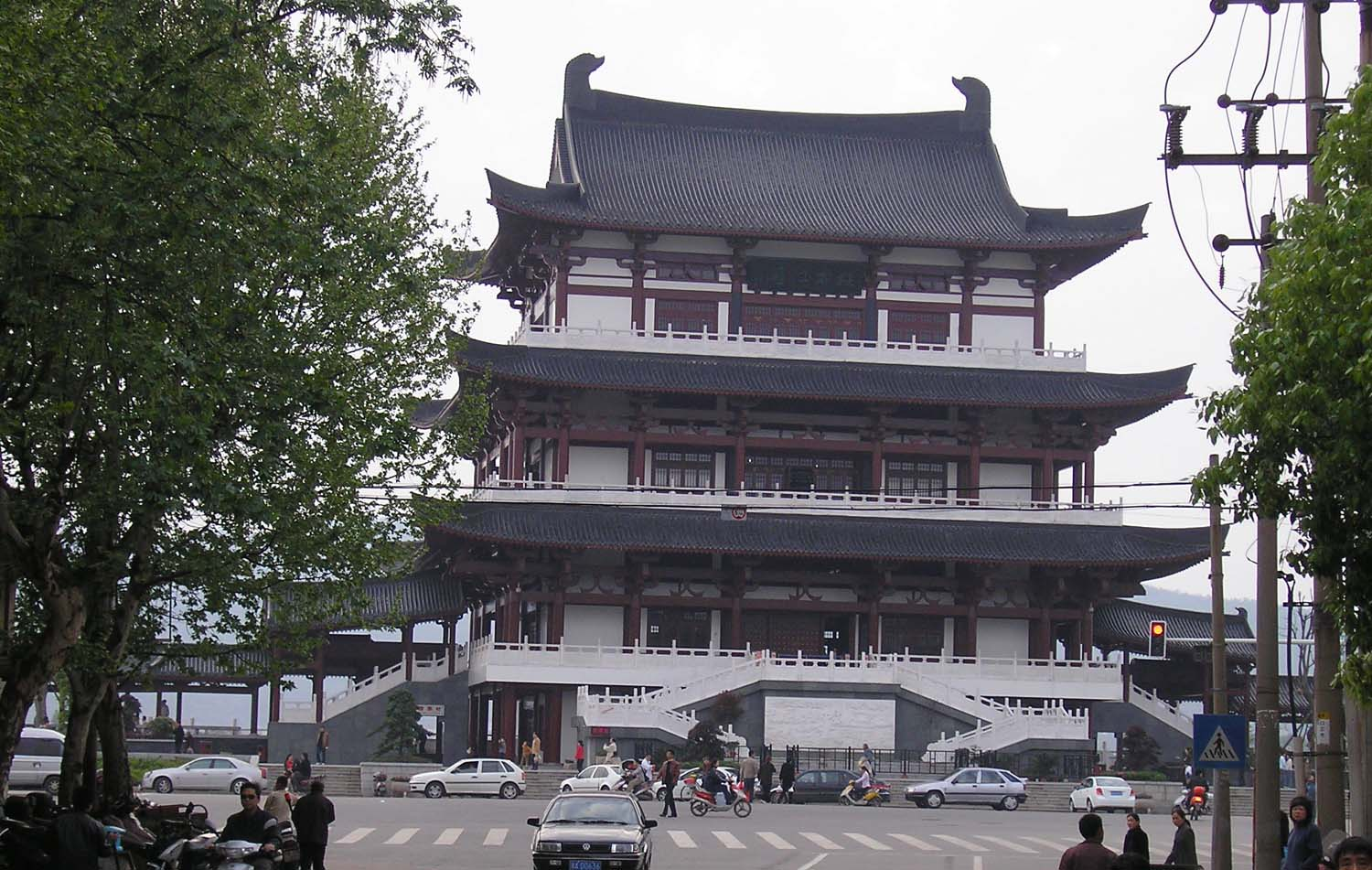
Dufu Pavilion

- Huogong Palace (Chinese: 火宫殿)
- Tianxin Pavilion (Chinese: 天心阁)
- Dufu Pavilion (Chinese: 杜甫江阁)
- Former Residence of Jia Yi
