= Yingwanzhen station =

Metro station in Changsha, China

Coordinates: 28°12′13″N 112°57′28″E

Yingwanzhen 溁湾镇
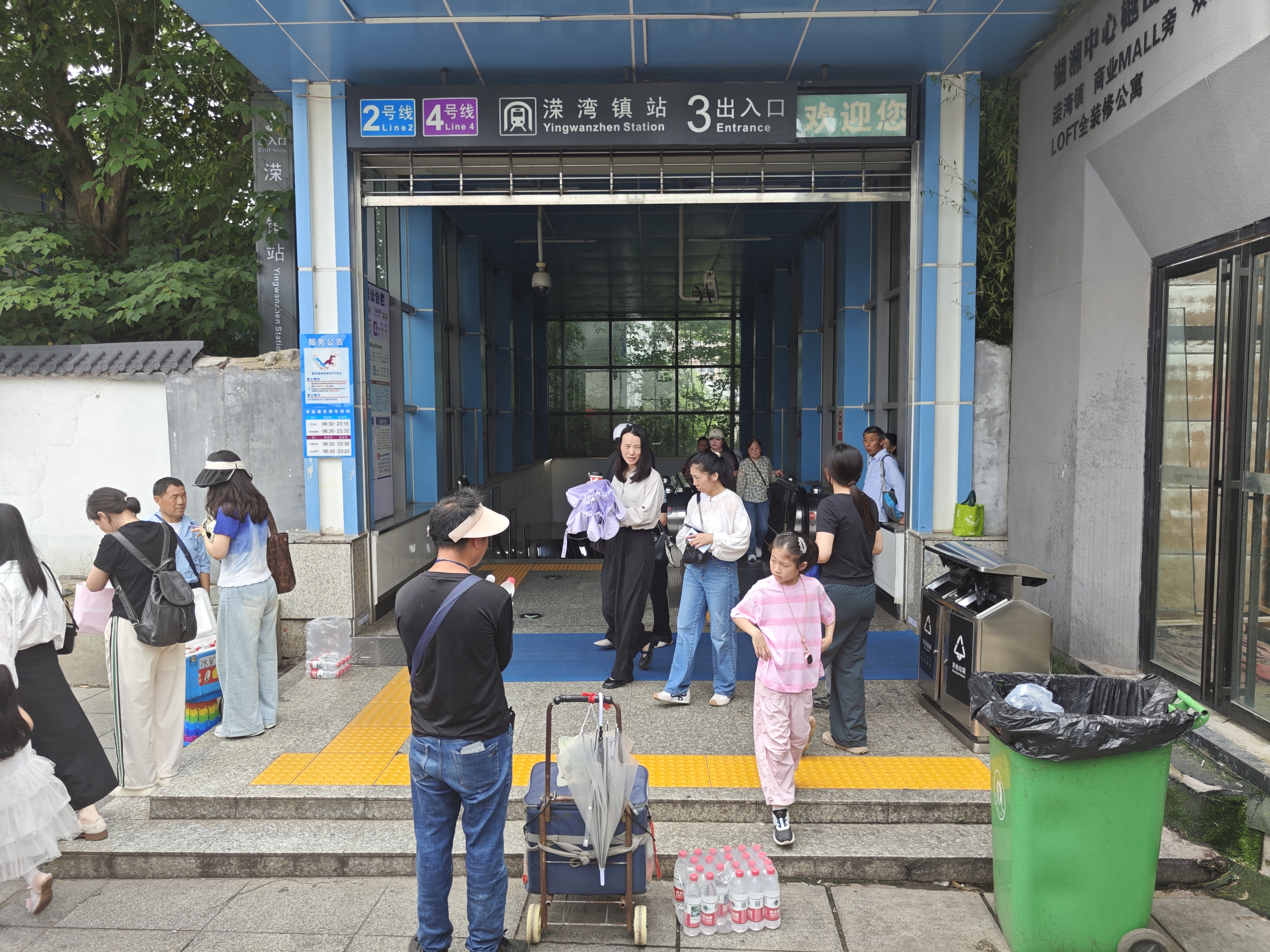
- Entrance 3

General information
- Location: Yuelu District, Changsha, Hunan; China
- Operated by: Changsha Metro
- Lines: Line 2 Line 4
- Platforms: 1 island platform

Other information
- Station code: 208

History
- Opened: 29 April 2014

Services
| Preceding station | Changsha Metro | Following station |
|---|---|---|
| Xihu Park towards West Meixi Lake | Line 2 | Juzizhou towards Guangda |
| Wangyuehu towards Guanziling | Line 4 | Hunan Normal University towards Dujiaping |
Location

Yingwanzhen station (simplified Chinese: 溁湾镇站; traditional Chinese: 濚灣鎮站; pinyin: Yíngwānzhèn Zhàn) is a subway station in Changsha, Hunan, China, operated by the Changsha subway operator Changsha Metro.

== Station layout ==
The station has one island platform.

| G | | Exits |
| LG1 | Concourse | Faregates, Station Agent |
| LG2 | ← | Line 2 towards West Meixi Lake (Xihu Park) |
| LG2 | Island platform, doors open on the left |
| LG2 | | Line 2 towards Guangda (Juzizhou) | → |
| LG3 | Devices | Device Storage |
| LG4 | ← | Line 4 towards Guanziling (Wangyuehu) |
| LG4 | Island platform, doors open on the left |
| LG4 | | Line 4 towards Dujiaping (Hunan Normal University) | → |

== History ==
The station opened on 29 April 2014.

== Surrounding area ==
- The Fourth Hospital of Changsha (长沙第四医院)
- Yuelu Mountain and Yuelu Academy
- Hunan University
- Hunan Normal University
