= Juzizhou station =

Metro station in Changsha, China

Coordinates: 28°12′05″N 112°58′08″E

Juzizhou 橘子洲
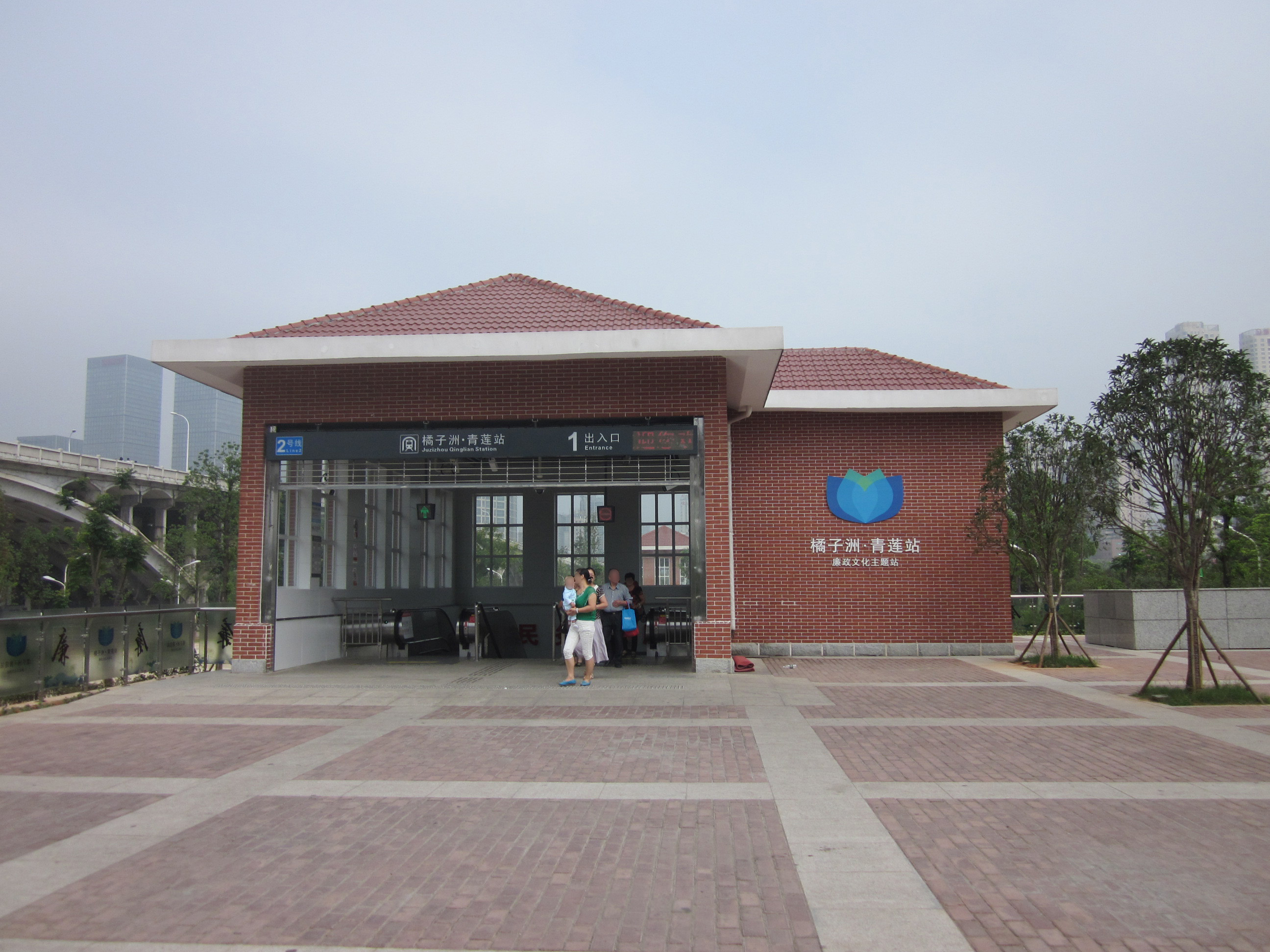
- Station entrance.

General information
- Location: Yuelu District, Changsha, Hunan; China
- Operated by: Changsha Metro
- Line(s): Line 2
- Platforms: 1 island platform

Other information
- Station code: 209

History
- Opened: 29 April 2014

Services
| Preceding station | Changsha Metro | Following station |
|---|---|---|
| Yingwanzhen towards West Meixi Lake | Line 2 | Xiangjiang Middle Road towards Guangda |

Juzizhou station is a subway station in Changsha, Hunan, China, operated by the Changsha subway operator Changsha Metro.

== Station layout ==
The station has one island platform.

| G | | Exits |
| LG1 | Buffer |
| LG2 | Concourse | Faregates, Station Agent |
| LG3 | Devices | Device Storage |
| LG2 | ← | Line 2 towards West Meixi Lake (Yingwanzhen) |
| LG2 | Island platform, doors open on the left |
| LG2 | | Line 2 towards Guangda (Xiangjiang Middle Road) | → |

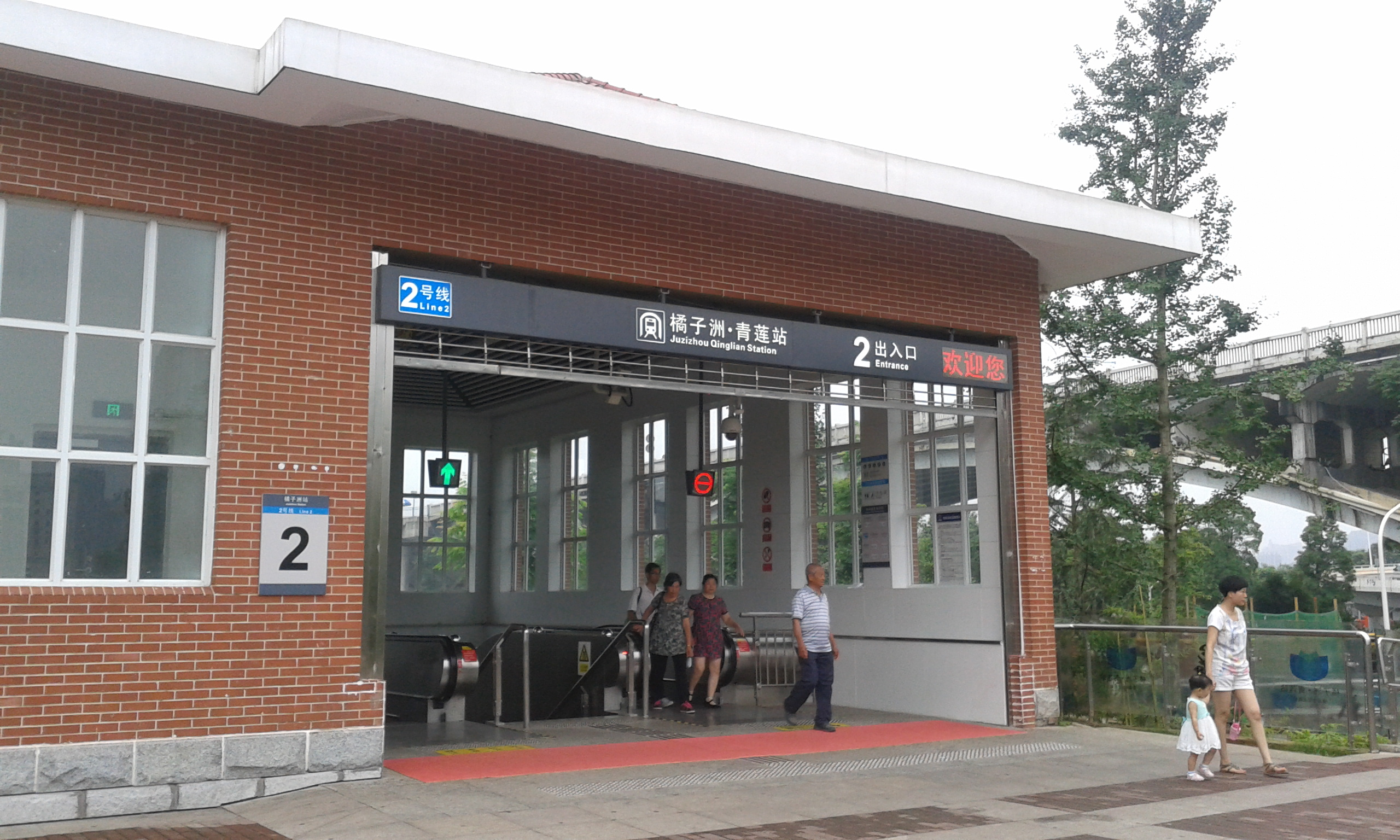
Entrance 2

== History ==
The station opened on 29 April 2014.

== Surrounding area ==
- Orange Isle
- The Youth Mao Zedong Statue
- Xiang River
