= Line 2 (Changsha Metro) =

Line of the Changsha Metro in Changsha, China

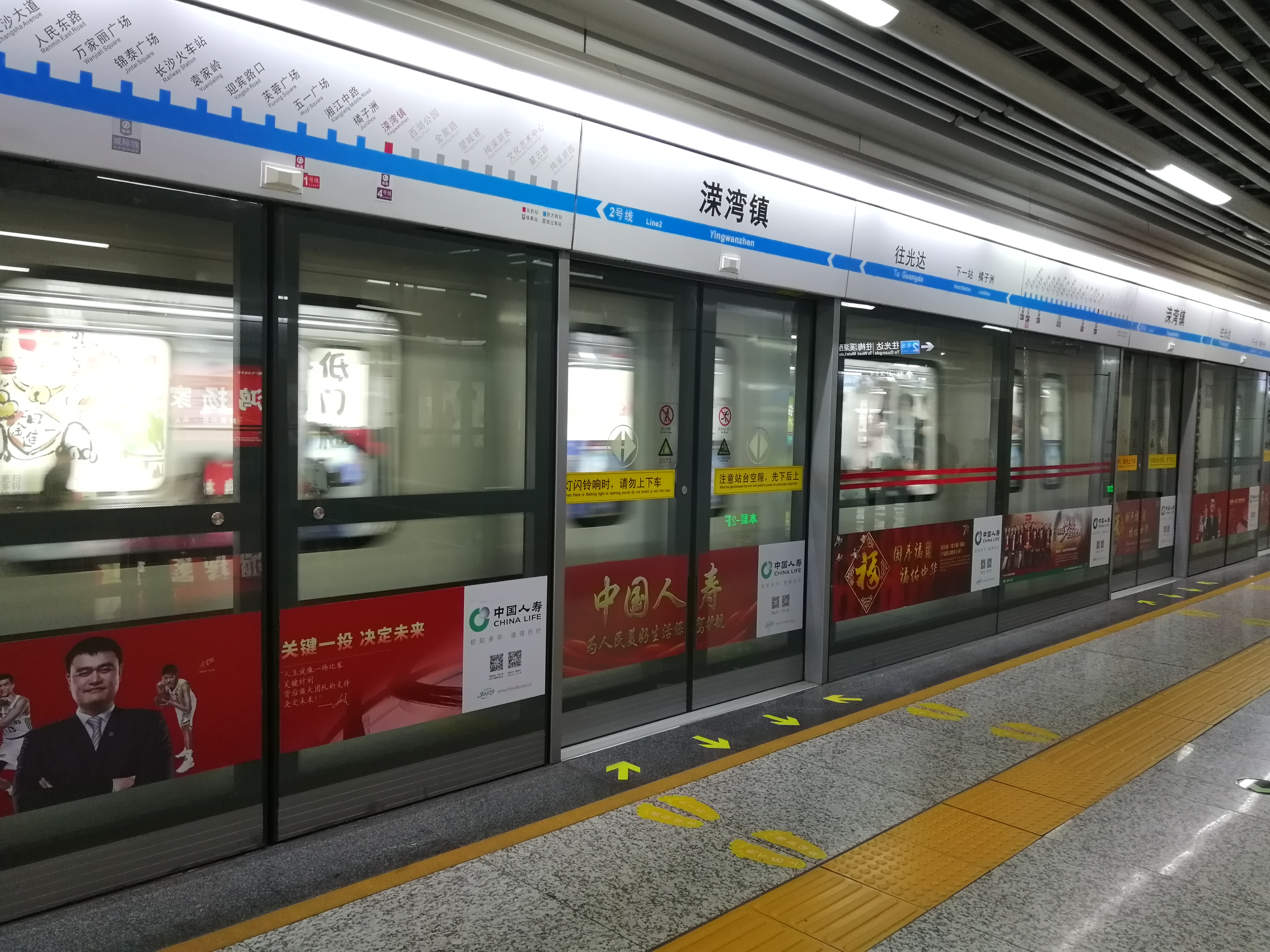
- Line 2 train at Yingwanzhen station

Overview
- Status: Operational
- Owner: Changsha Government
- Locale: Changsha, Hunan, China
- Termini: Longhuling (Future: West Railway Station); Guangda
- Stations: 34 (32 in operation)

Service
- Type: Rapid transit
- System: Changsha Metro
- Services: 1
- Operator: Changsha Metro Corporation

History
- Opened: 29 April 2014; 12 years ago

Technical
- Line length: 37.26 km (23.15 mi)
- Number of tracks: 2
- Character: Underground
- Track gauge: 1,435 mm (4 ft 8 1/2 in)

Line 2 of the Changsha Metro (Chinese: 长沙地铁二号线; pinyin: Chǎngshā Dìtiě Èr Hào Xiàn) is a rapid transit line running from west to east Changsha crossing the Xiang River. The Phase 1 of the line was opened on 29 April 2014 with 19 stations, Phase 1 of the western extension from West Meixi Lake to Wangchengpo opened on 28 December 2015 with 4 stations and Phase 2 of the western extension from West Meixi Lake to Longhuling opened on 4 September 2026 with 9 stations. This line is 37.26 km long with 32 stations.

== Opening timeline ==
Segment	Commencement	Length	Station(s)	Name
Wangchengpo — Guangda	29 April 2014	22.3 km (13.86 mi)	19	Phase 1
West Meixi Lake — Wangchengpo	28 December 2015	4.279 km (2.66 mi)	4	Western extension
West Meixi Lake — Longhuling	4 September 2026	11.06 km (6.87 mi)	9	Western extension II

== Stations ==
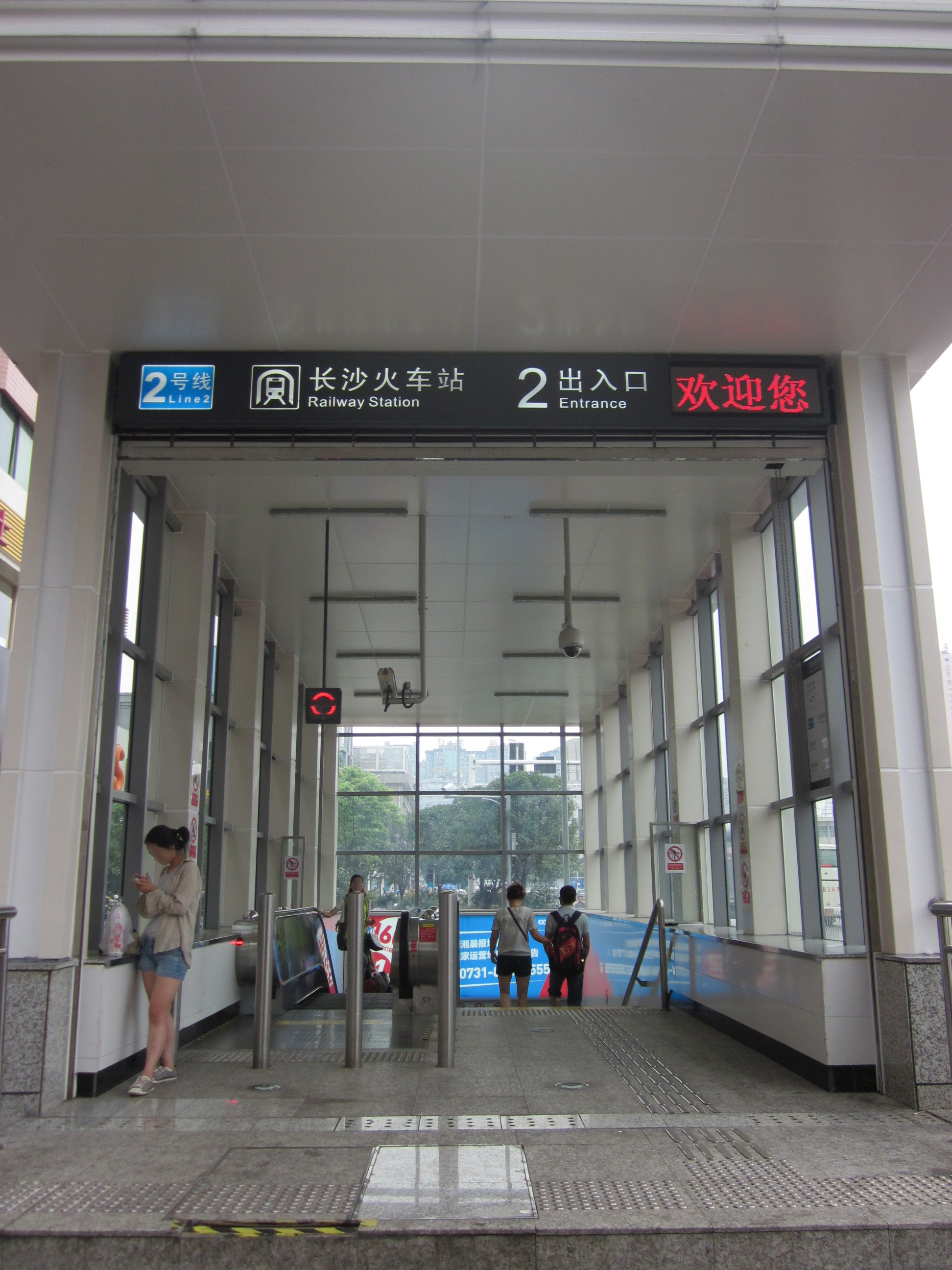
Changsha railway station (Line 2, Changsha Metro).

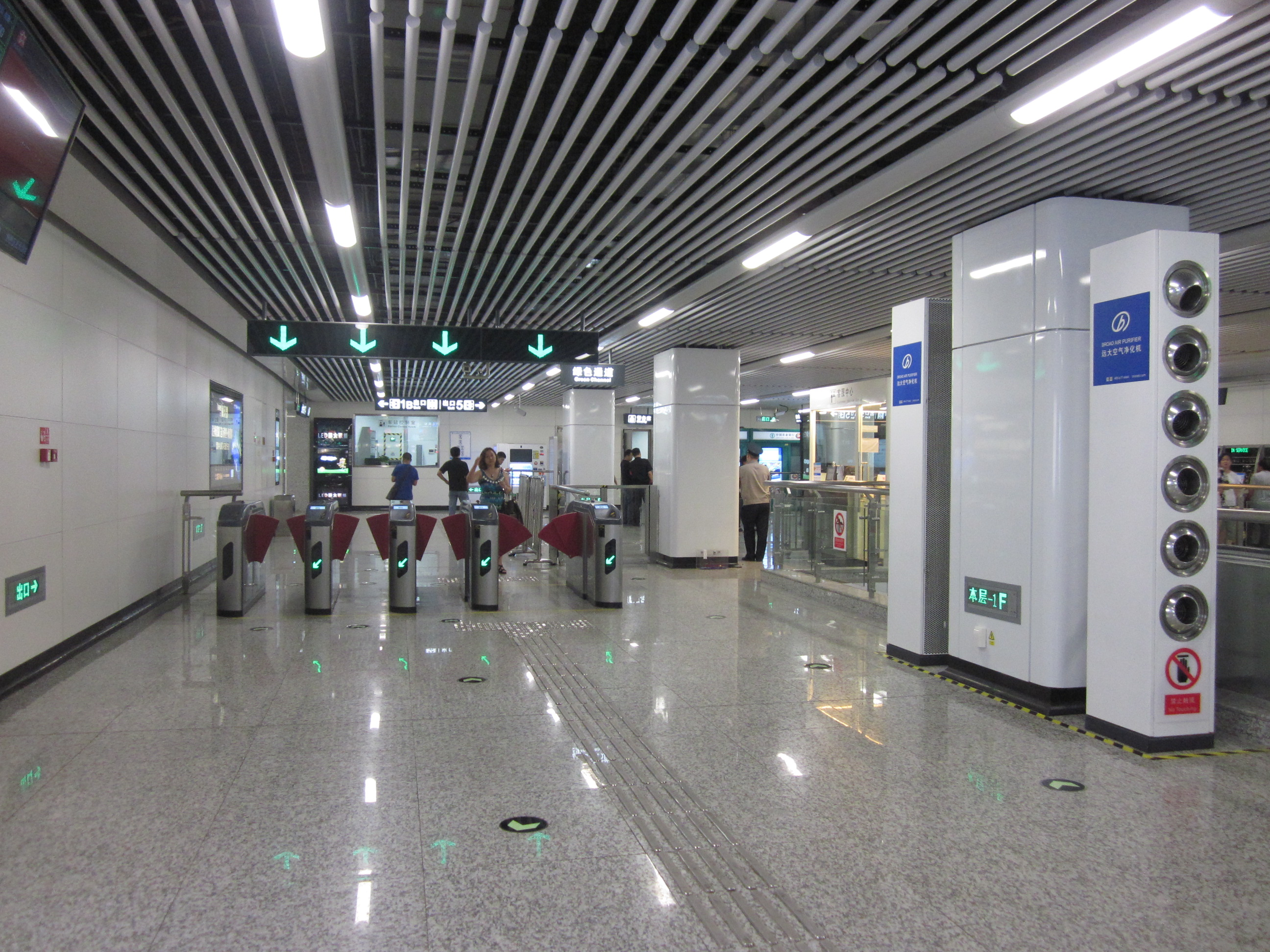
Line 2, Changsha Metro

Section	Station name		Connections	Distance km		Location
Section	English	Chinese	Connections	Distance km		Location
West extension II
West extension II	West Railway Station	长沙火车西站	Changsha West railway station			
West extension II	Longhuling	龙虎岭				
West extension II	Hualong	华龙				
West extension II	Zhenrenqiao	真人桥				
West extension II	Chetianwan	车田湾				
West extension II	Zhutianzhou	注田洲				
West extension II	Qiaotoupu	桥头铺				
West extension II	Mojiazhou	莫家洲				
West extension II	Caolongqiao	漕龙桥				
West extension II	Zhongtang	中塘	6			
West extension II	Shaojiawan	邵家湾				
Western extension I	West Meixi Lake	梅溪湖西		0.00	0.00	Yuelu
Western extension I	Luyun Road	麓云路		1.35	1.35	Yuelu
Western extension I	Culture and Arts Center	文化艺术中心		1.05	2.40	Yuelu
Western extension I	East Meixi Lake	梅溪湖东		1.10	3.50	Yuelu
Phase 1	Wangchengpo	望城坡		1.15	4.65	Yuelu
Phase 1	Jinxing Road	金星路		1.50	6.15	Yuelu
Phase 1	Xihu Park	西湖公园		1.25	7.40	Yuelu
Phase 1	Yingwanzhen	溁湾镇	4	1.15	8.55	Yuelu
Phase 1	Juzizhou	橘子洲		1.20	9.75	Yuelu
Phase 1	Xiangjiang Middle Road	湘江中路		0.70	10.45	Tianxin/Kaifu
Phase 1	Wuyi Square	五一广场	1	0.65	11.10	Tianxin/Kaifu/Furong
Phase 1	Furong Square	芙蓉广场		0.80	11.90	Furong
Phase 1	Yingbin Road	迎宾路口	6	0.80	12.70	Furong
Phase 1	Yuanjialing	袁家岭	7	0.80	13.50	Furong
Phase 1	Railway Station	长沙火车站	3 CSQ	1.05	14.55	Furong
Phase 1	Jintai Square	锦泰广场	CZT	0.70	15.25	Furong
Phase 1	Wanjiali Square	万家丽广场	5	1.25	16.50	Furong
Phase 1	Renmin East Road	人民东路	6	1.50	18.00	Furong/Yuhua
Phase 1	Changsha Avenue	长沙大道		2.00	20.00	Yuhua
Phase 1	Shawan Park	沙湾公园	4	1.20	21.20	Yuhua
Phase 1	Duhua Road	杜花路		1.80	23.00	Yuhua
Phase 1	South Railway Station	长沙火车南站	4 Maglev CWQ	1.00	24.00	Yuhua
Phase 1	Guangda	光达	4	2.00	26.00	Changsha Co.

== Future ==
An extension is planned that would see the line extended from its current western terminus, West Meixi Lake, north to the under construction Changsha West railway station. The feasibility study for this project was approved in January 2021.
