= Hunan Normal University station =

Subway in Hunan, China

Hunan Normal University station 湖南师范大学站
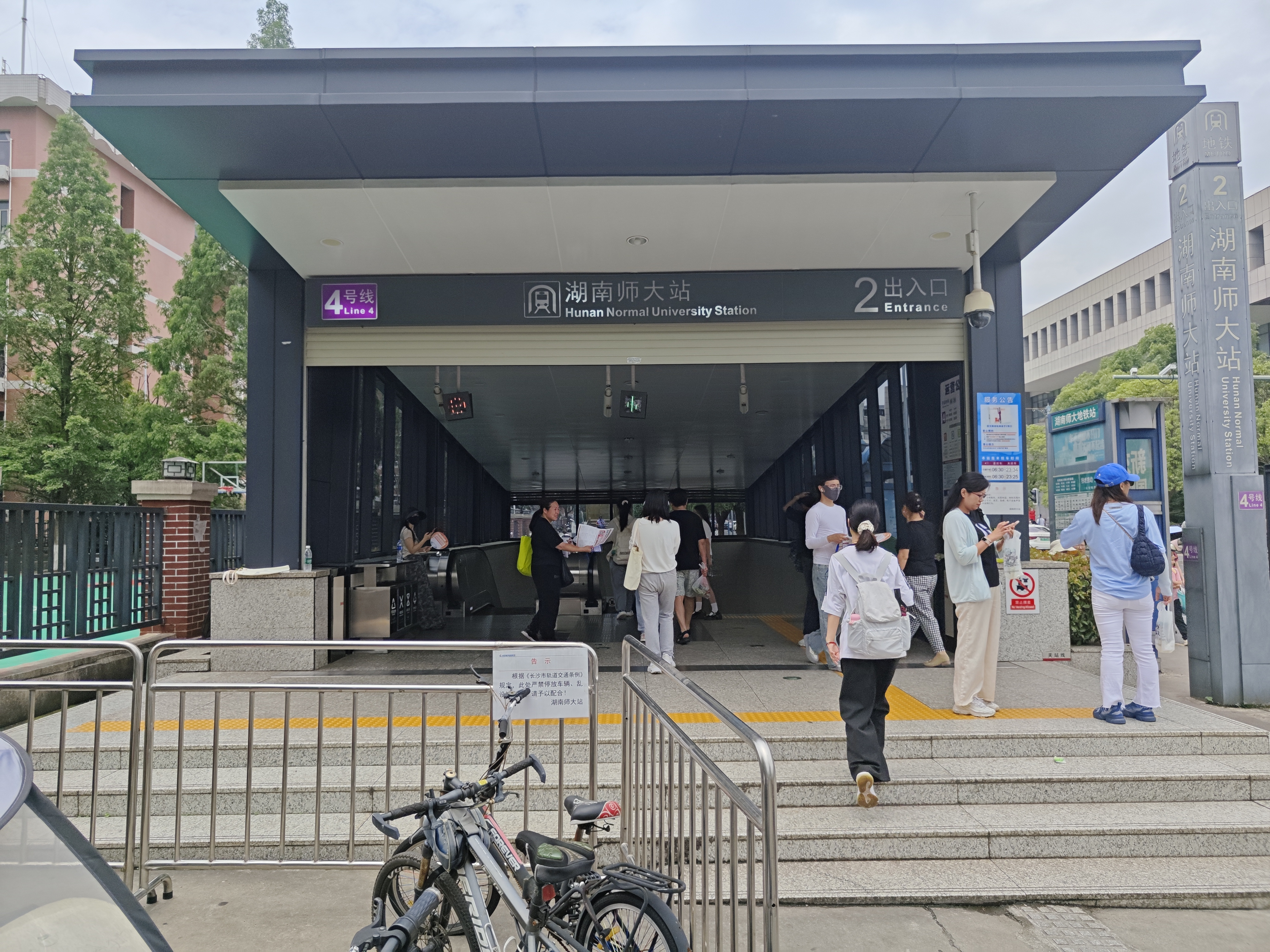
- No. 2 Entrance of Hunan Normal University Station

General information
- Location: Yuelu District, Changsha, Hunan; China
- Coordinates: 28°11′22″N 112°56′34″E
- Operated by: Changsha Metro
- Line: Line 4
- Platforms: 1 island platform

History
- Opened: 26 May 2019

Services
| Preceding station | Changsha Metro | Following station |
|---|---|---|
| Yingwanzhen towards Guanziling | Line 4 | Hunan University towards Dujiaping |
Location

Hunan Normal University station (simplified Chinese: 湖南师范大学站; traditional Chinese: 湖南師範大學站; pinyin: Húnan Shīfàn Dàxué Zhàn), commonly abbreviated as Hunan Shida station (湖南师大站; Húnan Shīdà Zhàn), is a subway station in Changsha, Hunan, China, operated by the Changsha subway operator Changsha Metro.

== Station layout ==
The station has one island platform.

== History ==
The station opened on 26 May 2019.

== Surrounding area ==
- Hunan Normal University
