= Hunan University station =

Subway station in Hunan, China

Hunan University station 湖南大学站
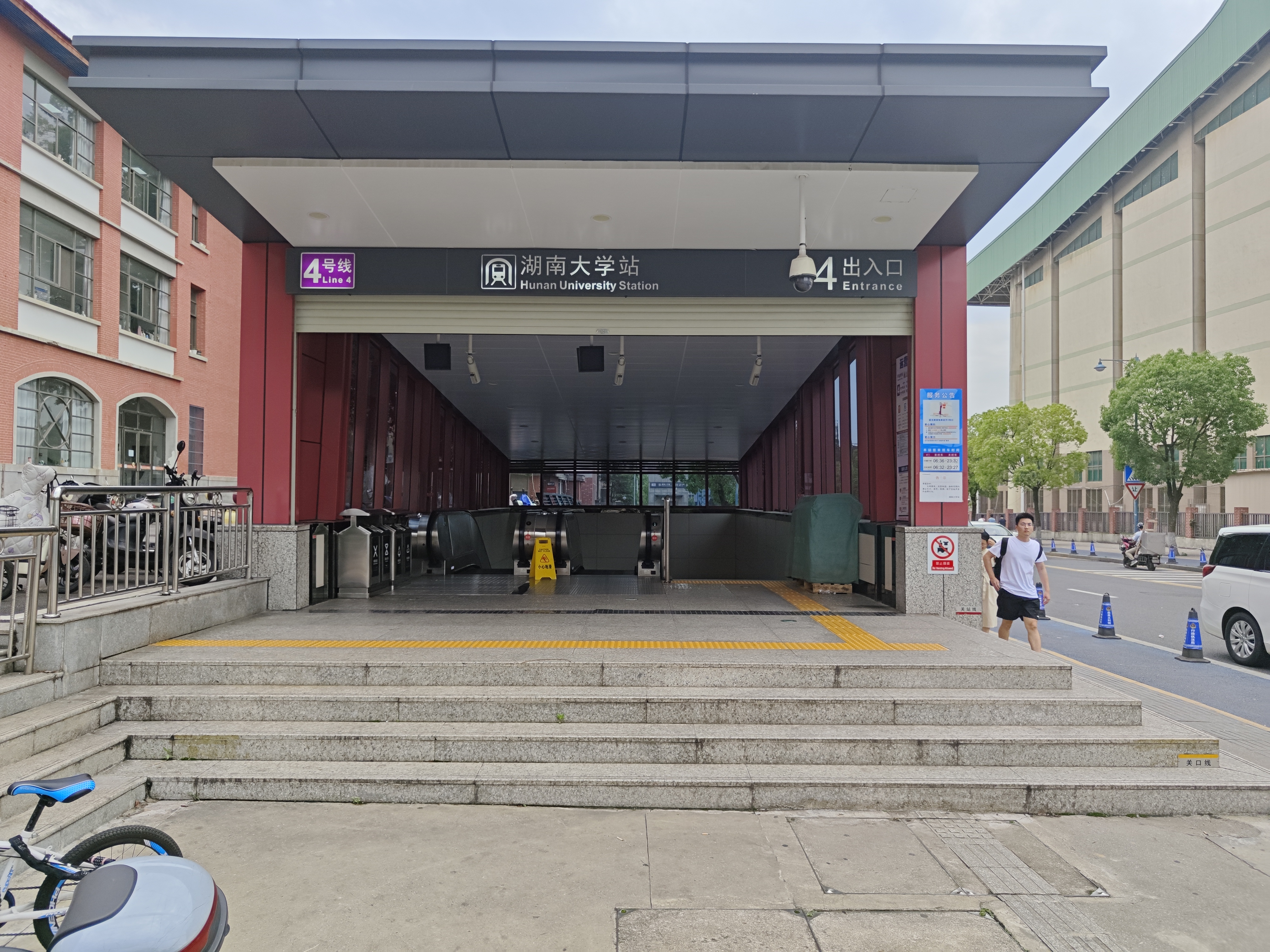
- No. 4 Entrance of Hunan University Station

General information
- Location: Yuelu District, Changsha, Hunan; China
- Coordinates: 28°11′02″N 112°56′28″E
- Operated by: Changsha Metro
- Line: Line 4
- Platforms: 1 island platform

History
- Opened: 26 May 2019

Services
Preceding station	Changsha Metro	Following station
Hunan Normal University towards Guanziling	Line 4	Fubuhe towards Dujiaping
Location

Hunan University station (simplified Chinese: 湖南大学站; traditional Chinese: 湖南大學站; pinyin: Húnan Dàxué Zhàn) is a subway station in Changsha, Hunan, China, operated by the Changsha subway operator Changsha Metro. Its name is derived from the nearby Hunan University campus.

== Station layout ==
The station has one island platform.

== History ==
The station was completed in November 2017 and opened on 26 May 2019.

== Surrounding area ==
- Hunan University
