= Mawangdui station =

Metro station in Changsha, China

Mawangdui station 马王堆站
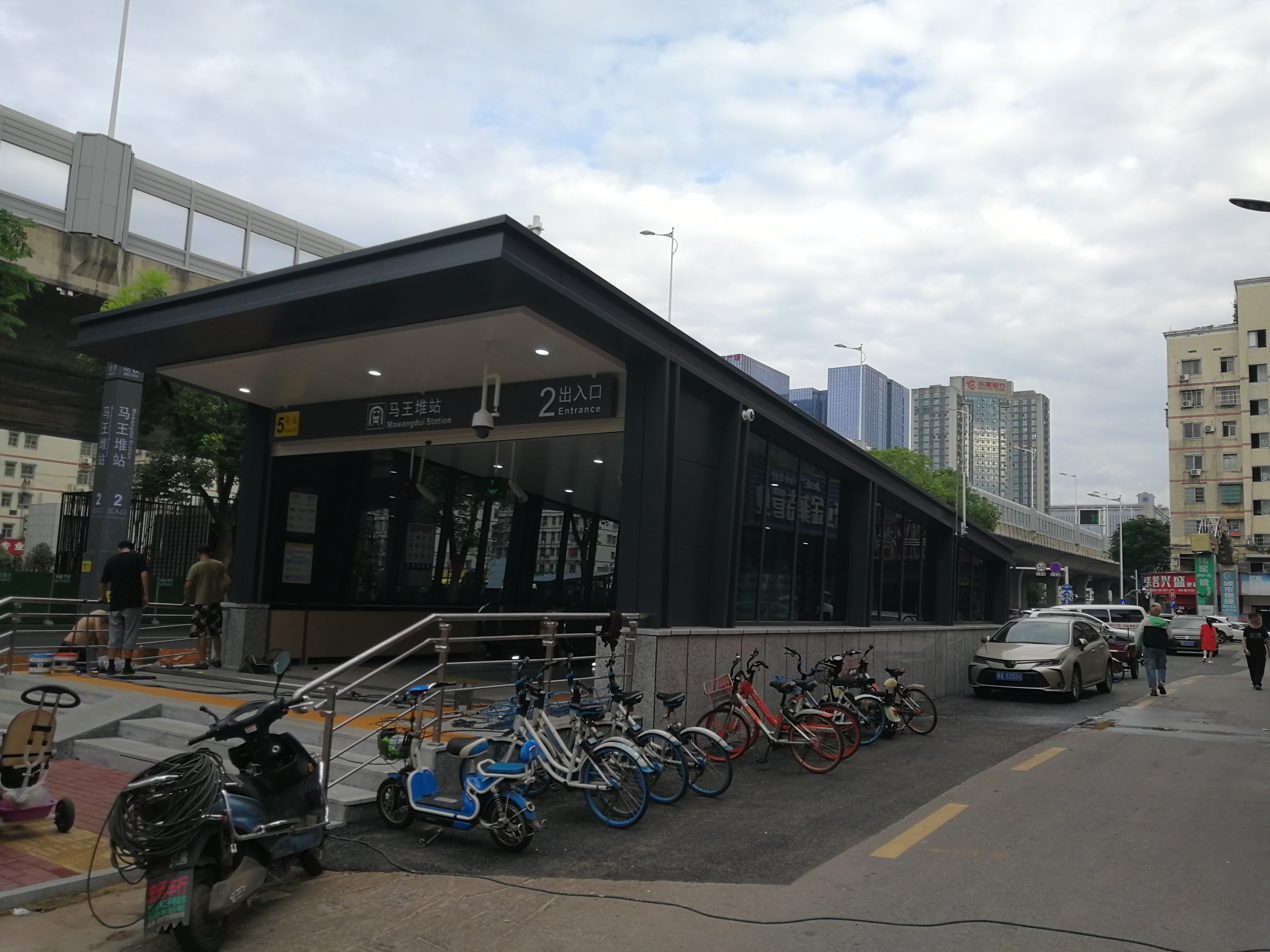

General information
- Location: Furong District, Changsha, Hunan; China
- Coordinates: 28°12′22″N 113°02′15″E
- Operated by: Changsha Metro
- Line(s): Line 5
- Platforms: 2 (1 island platform)

History
- Opened: 28 June 2020

Services
Preceding station	Changsha Metro	Following station
Wanjiali Square towards Maozhutang	Line 5	Huojucun towards Shuiduhe

Mawangdui station (Chinese: 马王堆站; pinyin: Mǎwángduī Zhàn) is a subway station in Furong District, Changsha, Hunan, China, operated by the Changsha subway operator Changsha Metro. It entered revenue service on 28 June 2020.

== History ==
The station started the test operation on 30 December 2019. The station opened on 28 June 2020.

== Surrounding area ==
- Hunan People's Hospital
- Mawangdui
