= Guangda station =

Metro station in Changsha, China

Guangda 光达
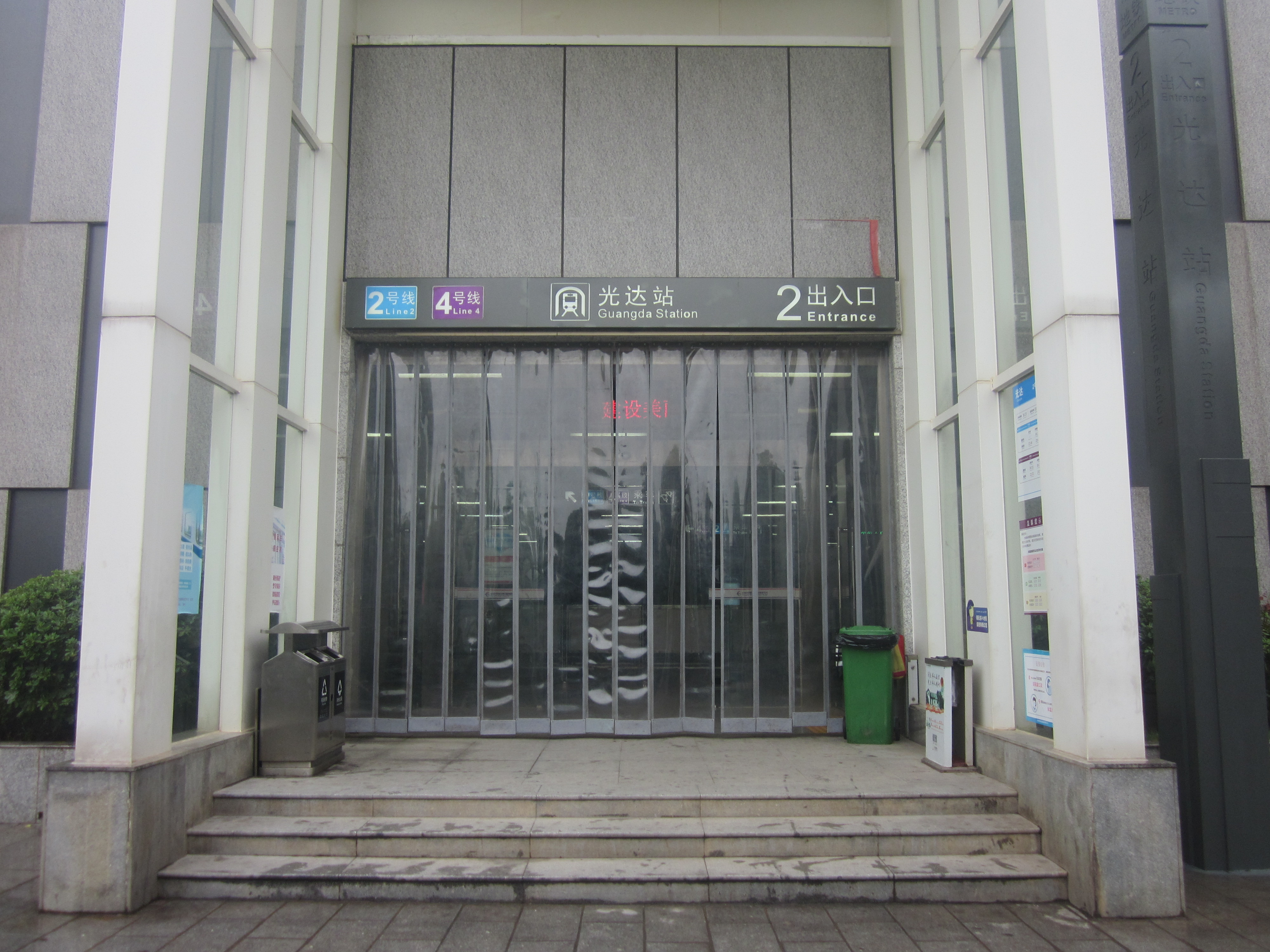
- No. 2 Entrance of Guangda Station

General information
- Location: Changsha County, Changsha, Hunan; China
- Coordinates: 28°09′14″N 113°05′30″E
- Operated by: Changsha Metro
- Lines: Line 2 Line 4
- Platforms: 2 (1 island platform)

Other information
- Station code: 223

History
- Opened: 29 April 2014 (Line 2); 26 May 2019 (Line 4)

Services
| Preceding station | Changsha Metro | Following station |
|---|---|---|
| South Railway Station towards West Meixi Lake | Line 2 | Terminus |
| South Railway Station towards Guanziling | Line 4 | Dujiaping Terminus |
Location

Guangda station (simplified Chinese: 光达站; traditional Chinese: 光達站; pinyin: Guāngdá Zhàn) is a subway station in Changsha County, Changsha, Hunan, China, operated by the Changsha subway operator Changsha Metro.

== Station layout ==
The station has one island platform.

| G | | Exits |
| LG1 | Concourse | Faregates, Station Agent |
| LG2 | | ← Line 2 towards West Meixi Lake (South Railway Station) |
| LG2 | Island platform, doors open on the left |
| LG2 | | Line 2 Terminus → |
| LG2 | | ← Line 4 towards Guanziling (South Railway Station) |
| LG2 | Island platform, doors open on the left |
| LG2 | | → Line 4 towards Dujiaping (Terminus) |

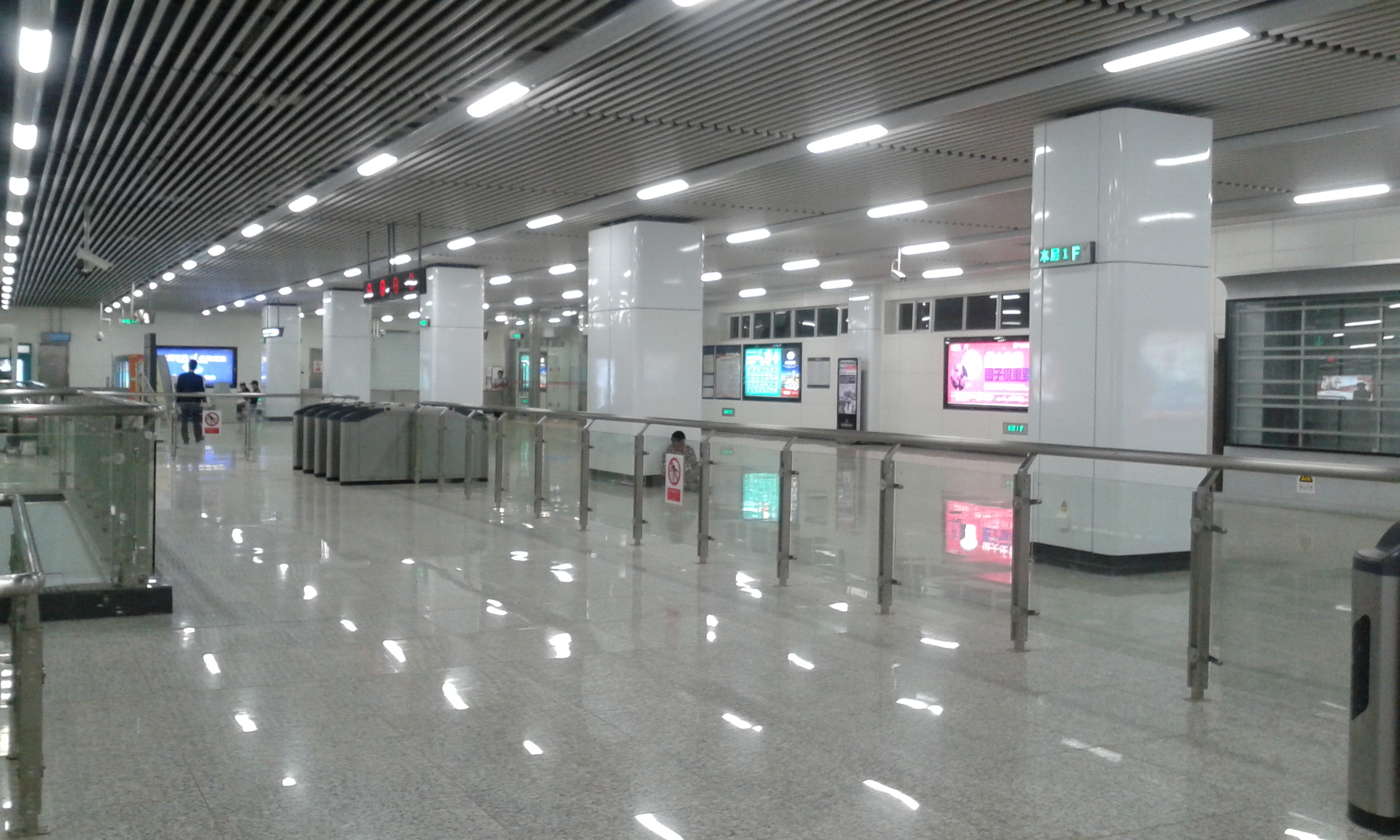
Station Hall

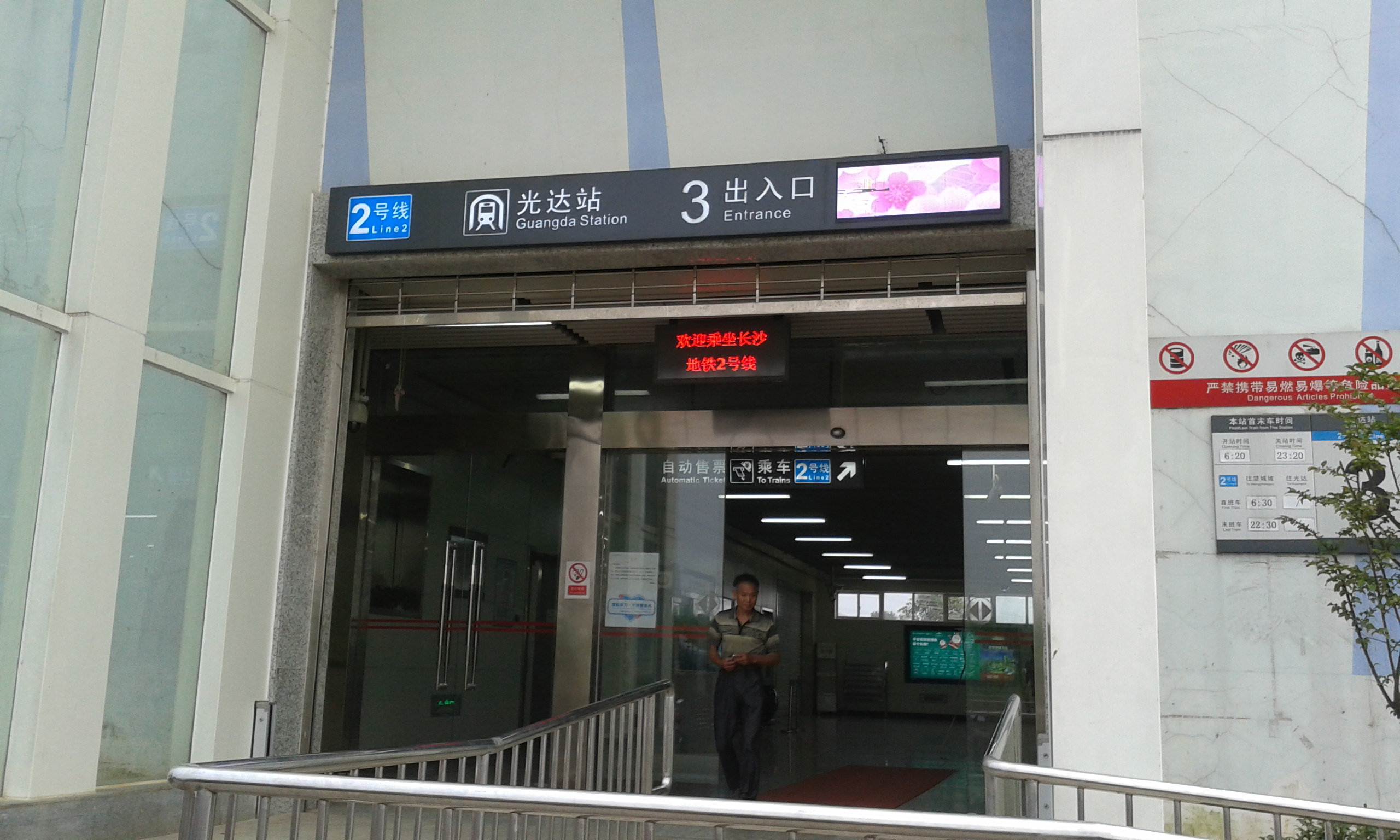
Entrance 3

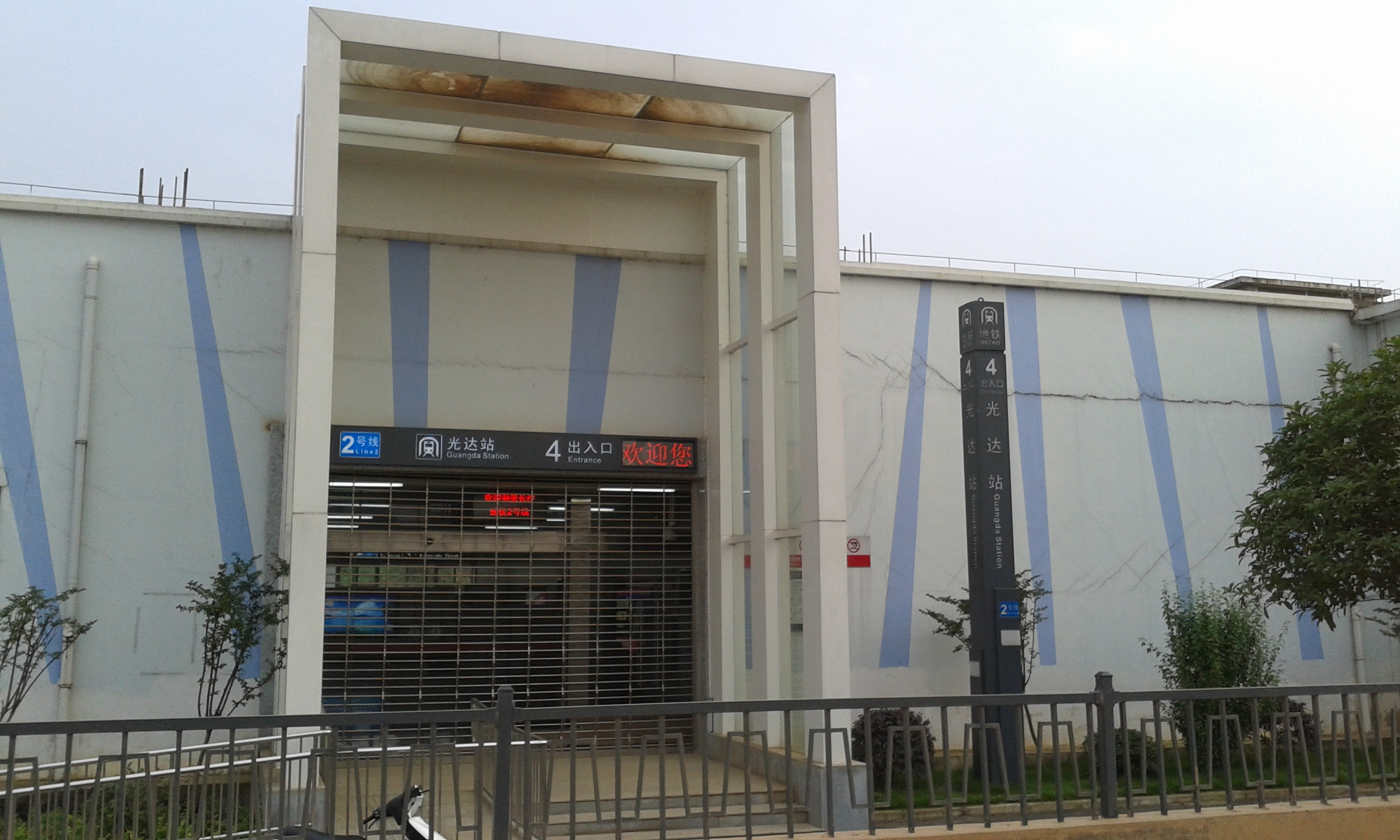
Entrance 4 (not open)

== History ==
The station opened on 29 April 2014.

== Surrounding area ==
- Hunan Agricultural University
