= West Meixi Lake station =

Metro station in Changsha, China

West Meixi Lake Station 梅溪湖西站
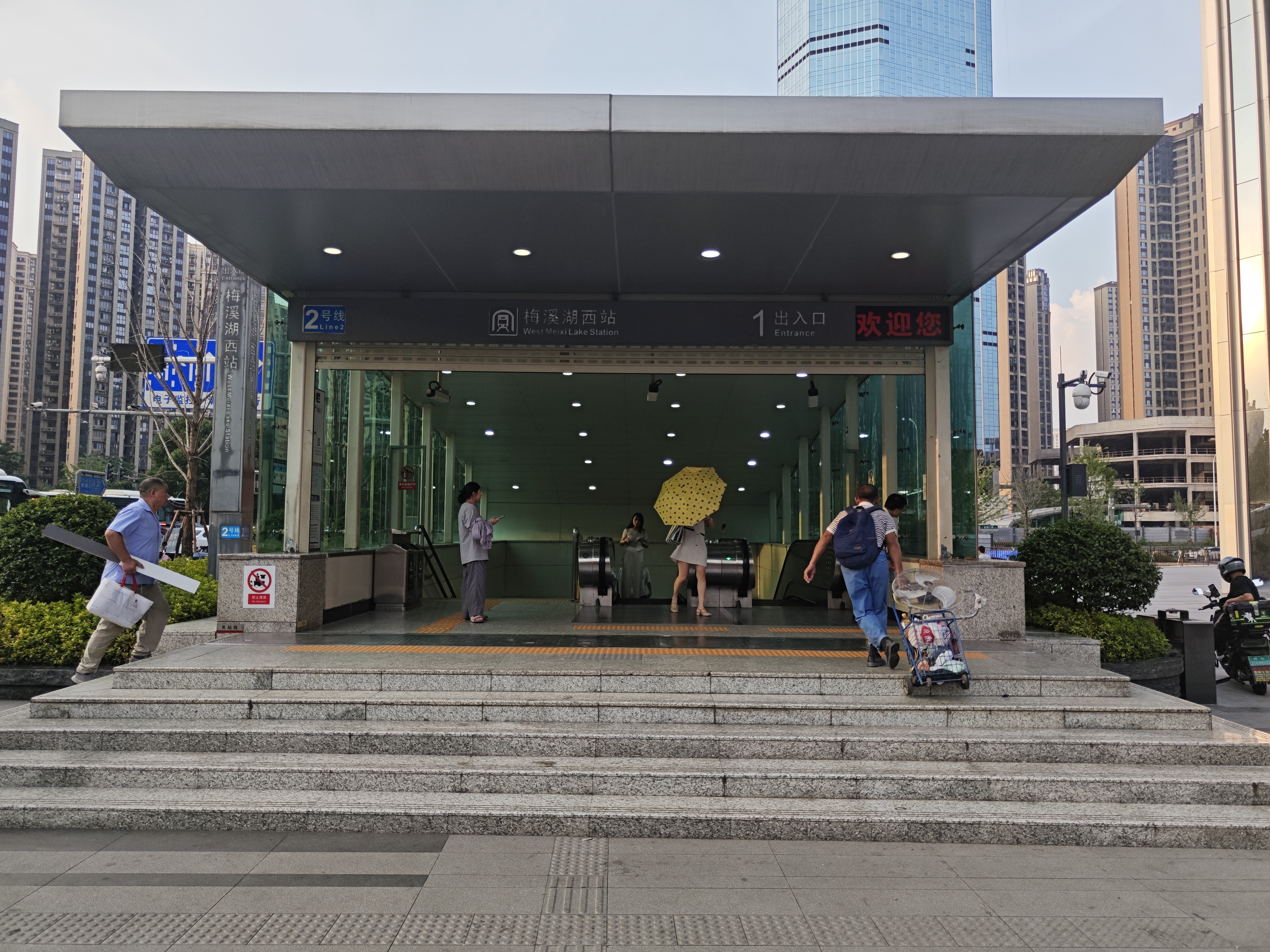
- Entrance 1

General information
- Location: Yuelu District, Changsha, Hunan; China
- Coordinates: 28°11′28″N 112°53′16″E
- Operator: Changsha Metro
- Line: Line 2
- Platforms: 2 (1 island platform)

Other information
- Station code: 201

Services
Preceding station	Changsha Metro	Following station
Shaojiawan towards Longhuling	Line 2	Luyun Road towards Guangda
Location

West Meixi Lake station is a subway station in Yuelu District, Changsha, Hunan, China, operated by the Changsha subway operator Changsha Metro. It entered revenue service on December 28, 2015.

== History ==
The station opened on 28 December 2015.

== Layout ==
G		Exits
LG1	Concourse	Faregates, Station Agent
LG2	←	Line 2 Terminus
LG2	Island platform, doors open on the left
LG2		Line 2 towards Guangda (Luyun Road)	→

== Surrounding area ==
- Entrance No. 1 and No. 2: Meixi Lake
- Entrance No. 4: Dongfanghong Town
