= Hunan Museum of Geology =

- 湖南省地质博物馆
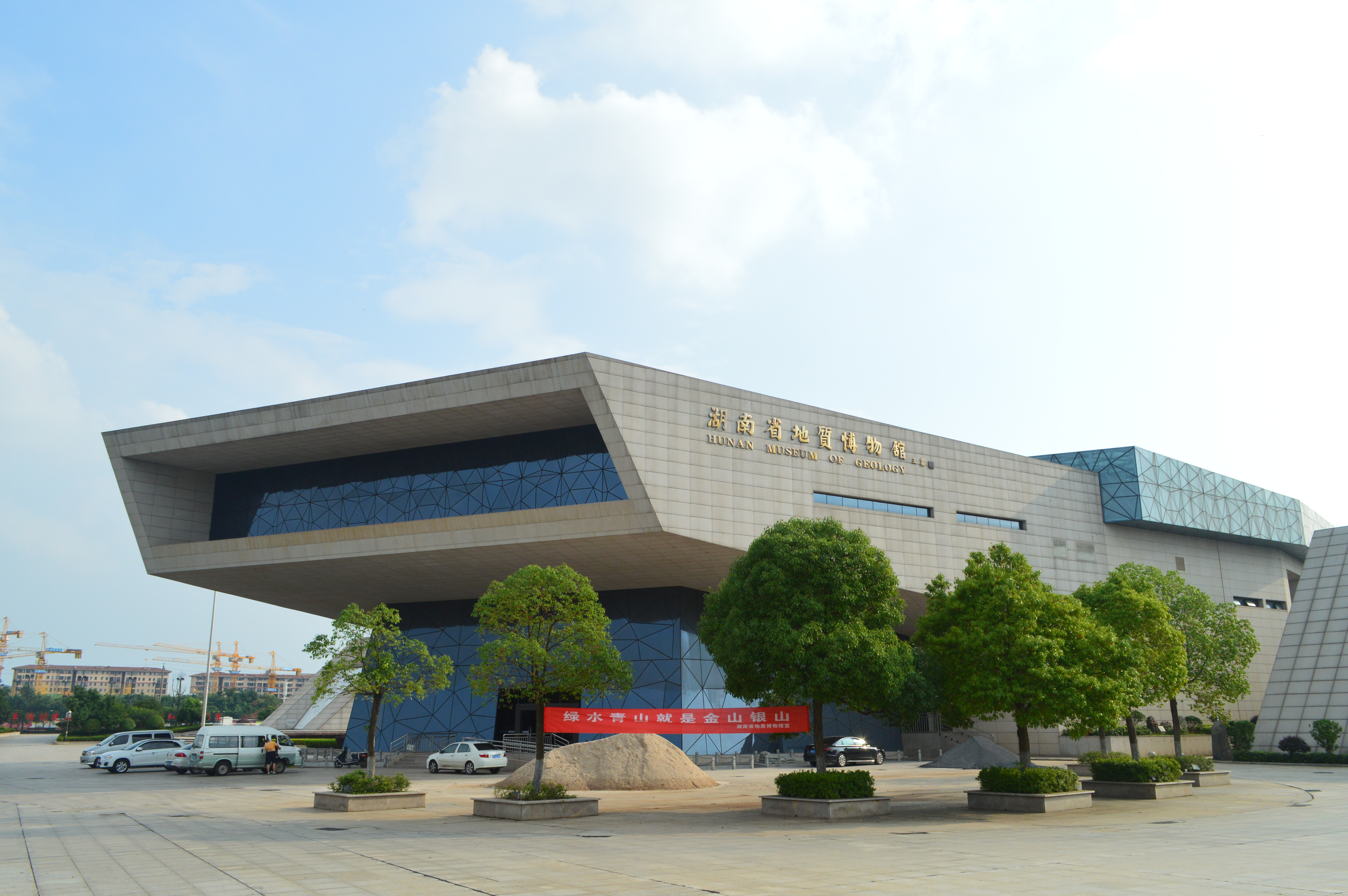
- Hunan Museum of Geology

- Location within Hunan
- Established: 1932; 94 years ago
- Location: Tianxin District, Changsha, Hunan
- Coordinates: 28°06′47″N 112°59′20″E
- Type: Geology museum
- Website: www.hndzbwg.com#/

Hunan Museum of Geology
- Simplified Chinese: 湖南省地质博物馆
- Traditional Chinese: 湖南省地質博物館
Transcriptions
Standard Mandarin
- Hanyu Pinyin: Húnánshěng Dìzhì Bówùguǎn

Hunan Museum of Geology (Chinese: 湖南省地质博物馆; pinyin: Húnánshěng Dìzhì Bówùguǎn) is a geology museum located in Tianxin District, Changsha, Hunan, China. It is adjacent to the Hunan Youth Activity Center, Hunan Mass Art Museum, and Hunan Science and Technology Museum.

== History ==
Hunan Museum of Geology traces its origins to the former "Specimen Display and Storage Room", founded by geologist Tian Qijuan (田奇镌) in 1932.

After the establishment of the Communist State, in 1958, the Exhibition Hall of Geology was founded by the Hunan Office of the Ministry of Geology of China. It was enlarged in 1975 and was renamed Hunan Museum of Geology. On 1 October 1980, Hunan Museum of Geology was officially opened to the public. In 1985, the then vice president Wang Zhen inspected the museum and inscribed the name.

In 2002, Hunan government approved the relocation and reconstruction of Hunan Geological Museum. At the end of 2008, the main project of the new Hunan Museum of Geology was completed. On 22 April 2012, the new Hunan Museum of Geology was officially opened to the public. On 11 December 2017, Hunan Museum of Geology began to close for renovation. On 19 April 2019, the Hunan Museum of Geology reopened and was officially reopened the next day.

On 21 December 2020, it has been categorized as a 2nd Grade National Museum by the China Museum Association.

== Architecture ==
Hunan Museum of Geology occupies a building area of 32,000-square-metre (340,000 sq ft) and the total area is over 48,000-square-metre (520,000 sq ft). It is mainly divided into six exhibition halls:

- Earth Mystery Hall
- Geology and Mineral Resources Hall
- Geological Environment Hall
- Life Evolution Hall
- Mineral and Gem Hall
- surveying, Mapping and Geographic Information Hall

== Transportation ==
- Take subway Line 1 to get off at Provincial Government station
