= Changsha Museum =

History museum in Hunan, China

- 长沙博物馆
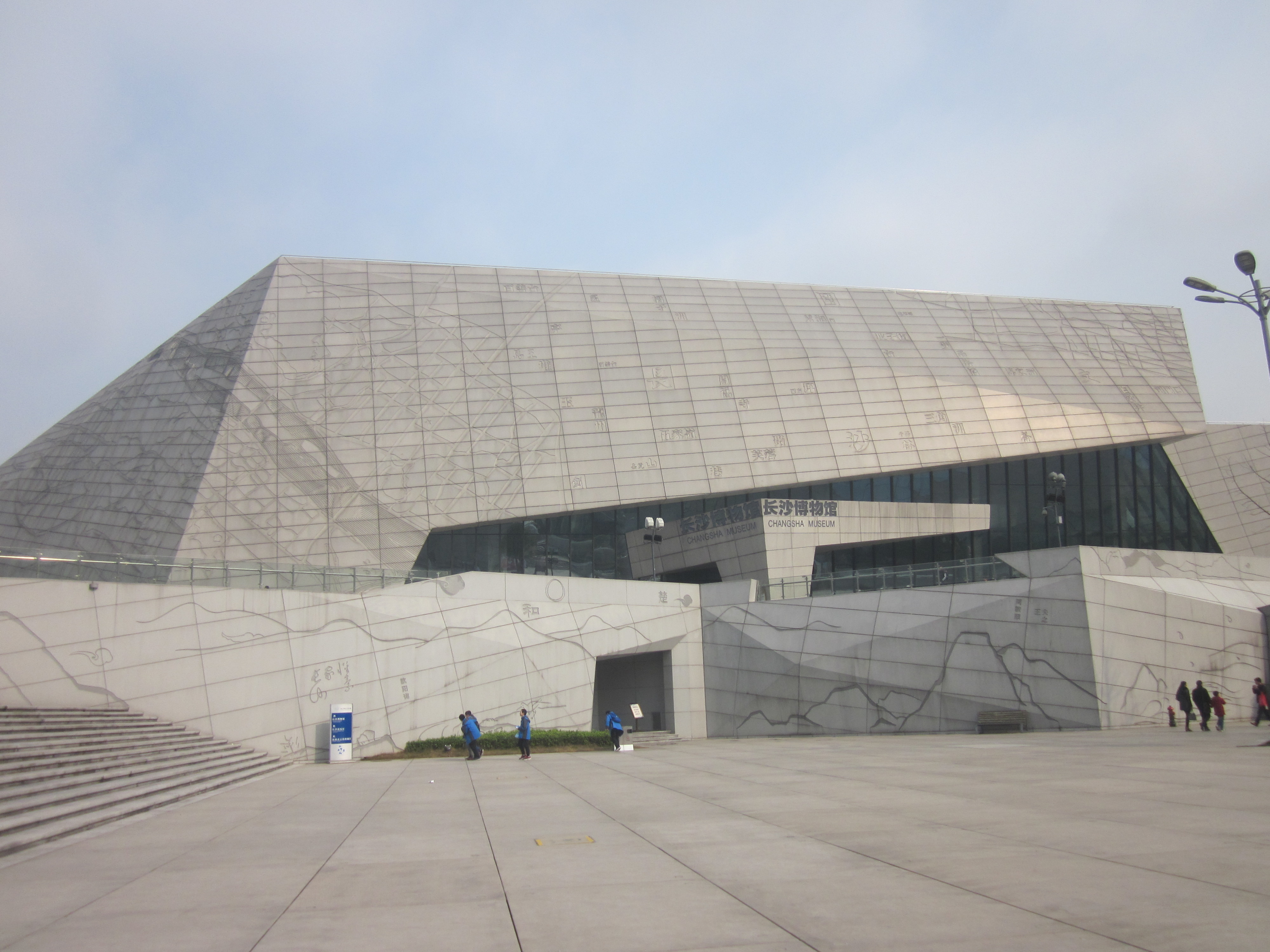
- Changsha Museum

- Location within Hunan
- Established: 2015
- Location: Kaifu District, Changsha, Hunan, China
- Coordinates: 28°14′55″N 112°59′11″E
- Collections: Bronzes of Shang and Zhou dynasties, Chinese ceramics, and cultural relic of Changsha
- Founder: Changsha government
- President: Wang Lihua (王立华)
- Website: www.csm.hn.cn

The Changsha Museum (simplified Chinese: 长沙博物馆; traditional Chinese: 長沙博物館; pinyin: Chángshā Bówùguǎn) is a history museum located at Beichen Delta in Kaifu District, Changsha, Hunan, China. It is adjacent to the Changsha Concert Hall, Changsha Planning Exhibition Hall and Changsha Library. It has a constructed area of 24,000 square metres (260,000 sq ft).

== History ==
Changsha Museum was constructed in 2015.

== Collections ==
The collections include Bronzes of Shang and Zhou dynasties, Chinese ceramics, and cultural relic of Changsha.

== Public access ==
Changsha Museum open to visitors for free.

Changsha Museum is closed on Mondays, and is open from 9:00 am to 17:00 pm daily.

Nearby attractions include the Changsha Concert Hall, Changsha Planning Exhibition Hall and Changsha Library.

== Transportation ==
- Take subway Line 1 to get off at Beichen Delta Station
- Take bus No. 11 or 106 to Liangguan Yiting Bus Stop (两馆一厅站)
