= Hunan Science and Technology Museum =

Museum in Changsha, Hunan, China

- 湖南省科学技术馆
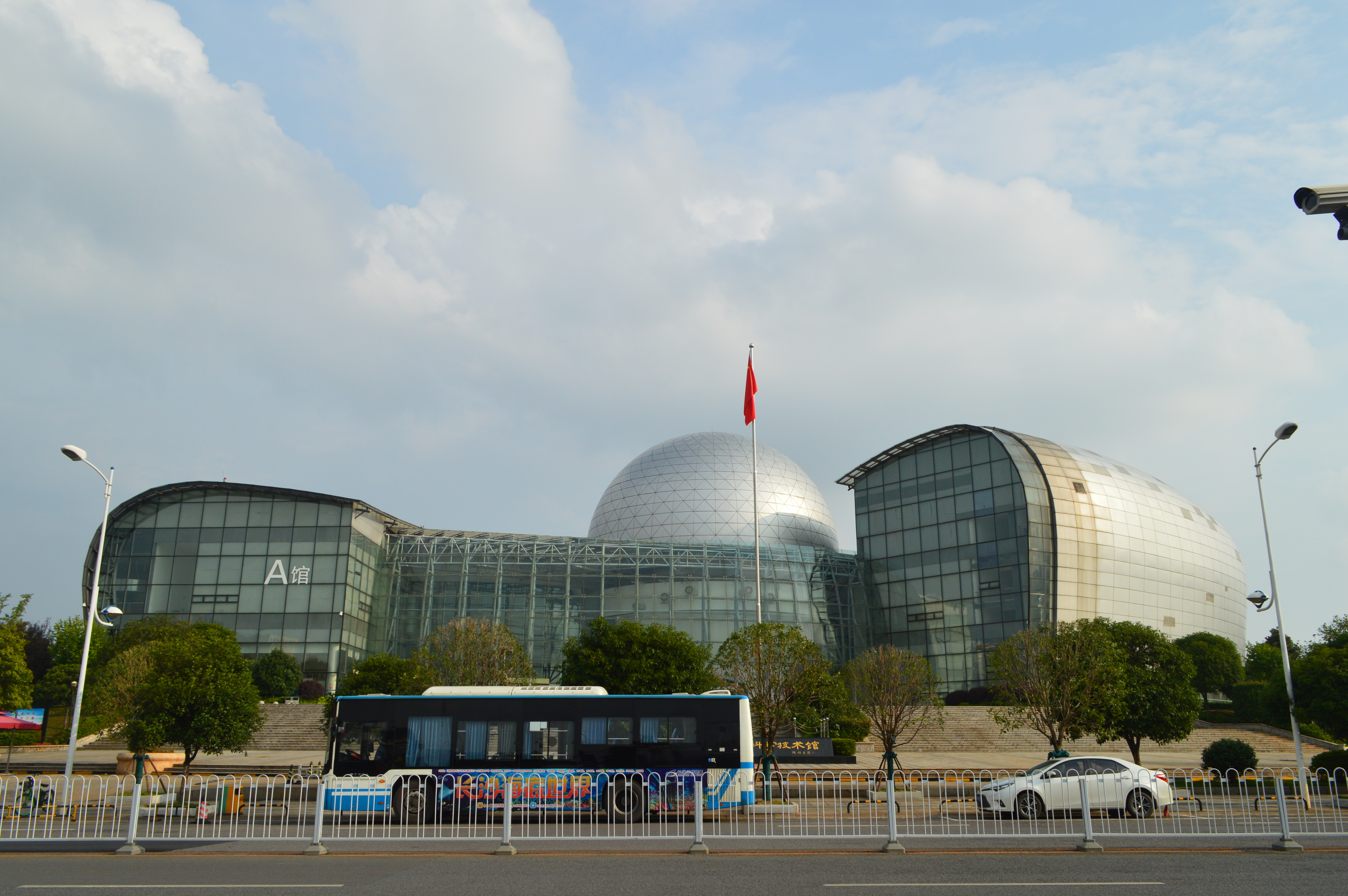
- Hunan Provincial Science and Technology Museum

- Location within Hunan
- Location: Tianxin District, Changsha, Hunan
- Coordinates: 28°06′48″N 112°59′33″E
- Website: www.hnstm.org.cn

Hunan Science and Technology Museum
- Simplified Chinese: 湖南省科学技术馆
- Traditional Chinese: 湖南省科學技術館
Transcriptions
Standard Mandarin
- Hanyu Pinyin: Húnánshěng Kēxué Jìshù Guǎn

Hunan Science and Technology Museum (Chinese: 湖南省科学技术馆; pinyin: Húnánshěng Kēxué Jìshù Guǎn) is a museum located in Tianxin District, Changsha, Hunan, China. It is adjacent to the Hunan Youth Activity Center, Hunan Mass Art Museum, and Hunan Museum of Geology.

== History ==
Hunan Science and Technology Museum was founded by the Hunan government and Changsha government.

On 9 April 2021, Hunan Science and Technology Museum has been designated as a "Youth Education Base of Hunan" by the Hunan Provincial Committee of the Communist Youth League of China.

== Architecture ==
Hunan Science and Technology Museum occupies a building area of 28,113-square-metre (302,610 sq ft) and the total area is over 124,000-square-metre (1,330,000 sq ft). The main building is in the shape of "Whirlpool Galaxy" and draws lessons from the "cirrus pattern" of Chu culture.

The halls of the museum are as follows:

- Sharing Hall
- Heaven and Earth Hall
- Information Harbor Hall
- Mathematical Enlightenment Hall
- Space Exploration Hall
- Earth Home Hall
- Energy World Hall
- Life Experience Hall
- Children's Fun Hall

== Transportation ==
- Take subway Line 1 to get off at Provincial Government station
