= Kaifu District Government station =

Subway station on the Changsha Metro in Changsha, Hunan, China

Kaifu District Government Station 开福区政府站
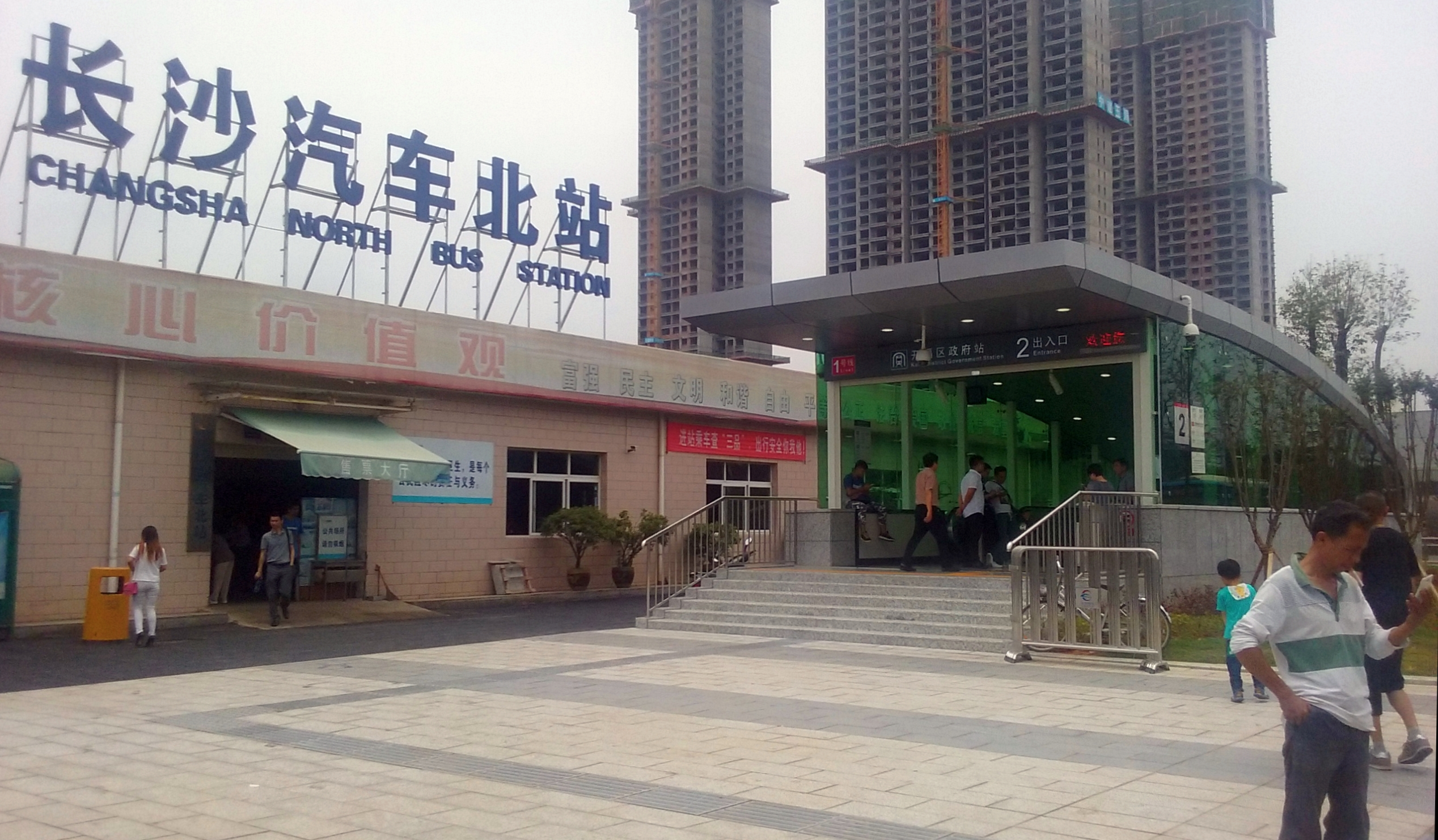
- Entrance No. 2 of Kaifu District Government Station.

General information
- Location: Kaifu District, Changsha, Hunan; China
- Coordinates: 28°16′03″N 112°59′31″E
- Operated by: Changsha Metro
- Line: Line 1
- Platforms: 2 (1 island platform)

Other information
- Station code: 101

History
- Opened: 28 June 2016; 9 years ago

Services
Preceding station	Changsha Metro	Following station
Sulongqiao towards Jinpenqiu	Line 1	Machang towards Shangshuangtang
Location

Kaifu District Government station is a subway station in Kaifu District, Changsha, Hunan, China, operated by the Changsha subway operator Changsha Metro.

== History ==
The station was opened and entered revenue service on 28 June 2016.

== Layout ==
G		Exits
LG1	Concourse	Faregates, Station Agent
LG2	←	Line 1 towards Jinpenqiu (Sulongqiao)
LG2	Island platform, doors open on the left
LG2		Line 1 towards Shangshuangtang (Machang)	→

== Surrounding area ==
- Entrance No. 1: Xiangjiang Century City, Kaifu District Government, APTECH (Beida Qingniao)
- Entrance No. 2: Changsha North Bus Station
- Entrance No. 4: Football Park
