= Railway Campus station =

Metro station in Changsha, China

Railway Campus (CSU) 铁道学院站
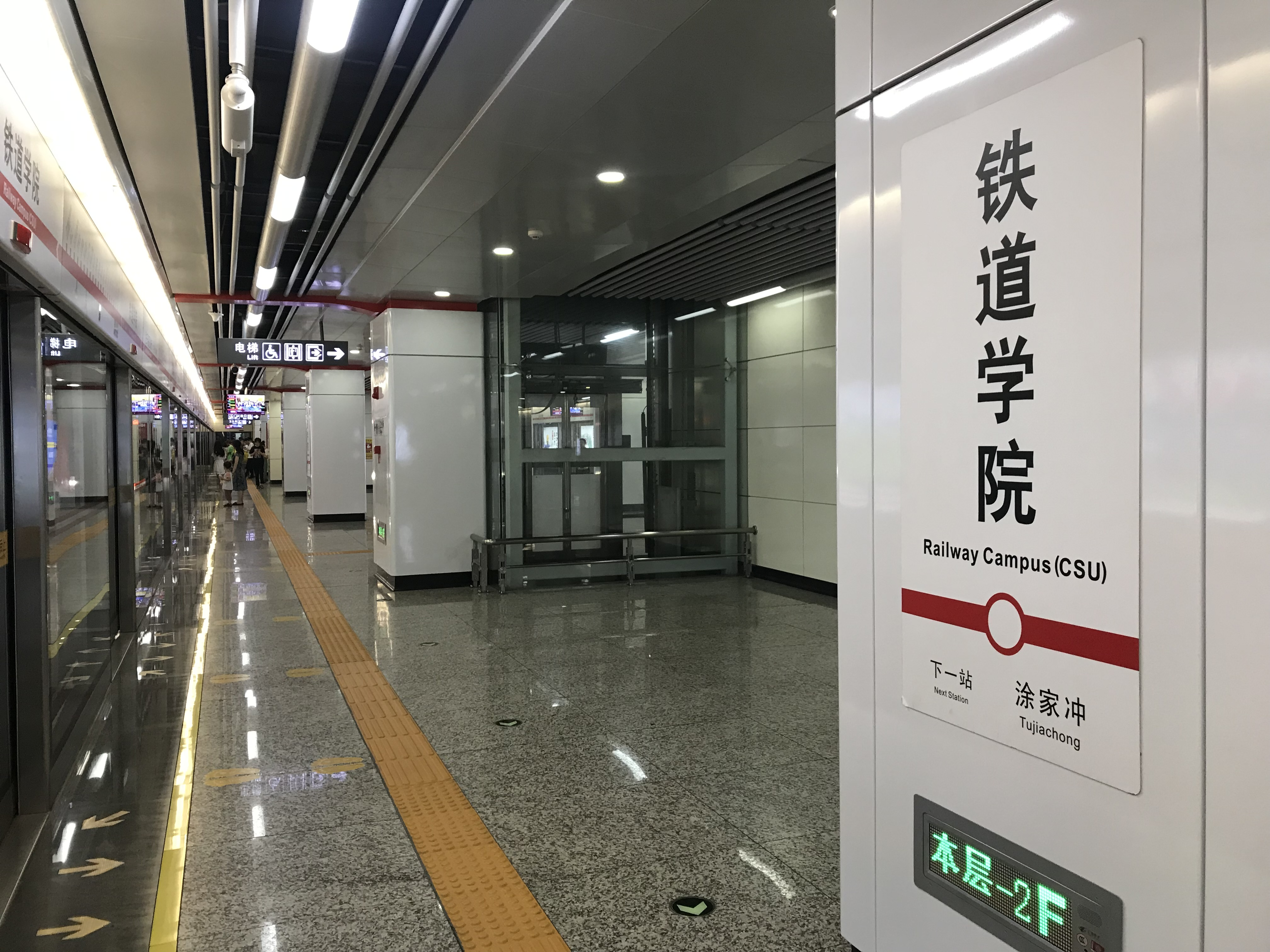
- Platform

General information
- Location: Tianxin District, Changsha, Hunan; China
- Coordinates: 28°08′30″N 112°59′38″E
- Operated by: Changsha Metro
- Line: Line 1
- Platforms: 2 (1 island platform)

History
- Opened: 28 June 2016; 9 years ago

Services
Preceding station	Changsha Metro	Following station
Tujiachong towards Jinpenqiu	Line 1	Youyi Road towards Shangshuangtang
Location

Railway Campus (CSU) station is a subway station in Tianxin District, Changsha, Hunan, China, operated by the Changsha subway operator Changsha Metro. It entered revenue service on June 28, 2016.

== History ==
The station opened on 28 June 2016.

== Layout ==
G		Exits
LG1	Concourse	Faregates, Station Agent
LG2	Devices	Device Storage
LG3	←	Line 1 towards Jinpenqiu (Tujiachong)
LG3	Island platform, doors open on the left
LG3		Line 1 towards Shangshuangtang (Youyi Road)	→

== Surrounding area ==
- Entrance No. 3: Railway Campus of Central South University, Hunan Radio and TV University, Hunan Network Engineering Vocational College, Central South University of Forestry and Technology
