= Machang station =

Subway station in Hunan, China

Machang Station 马厂站
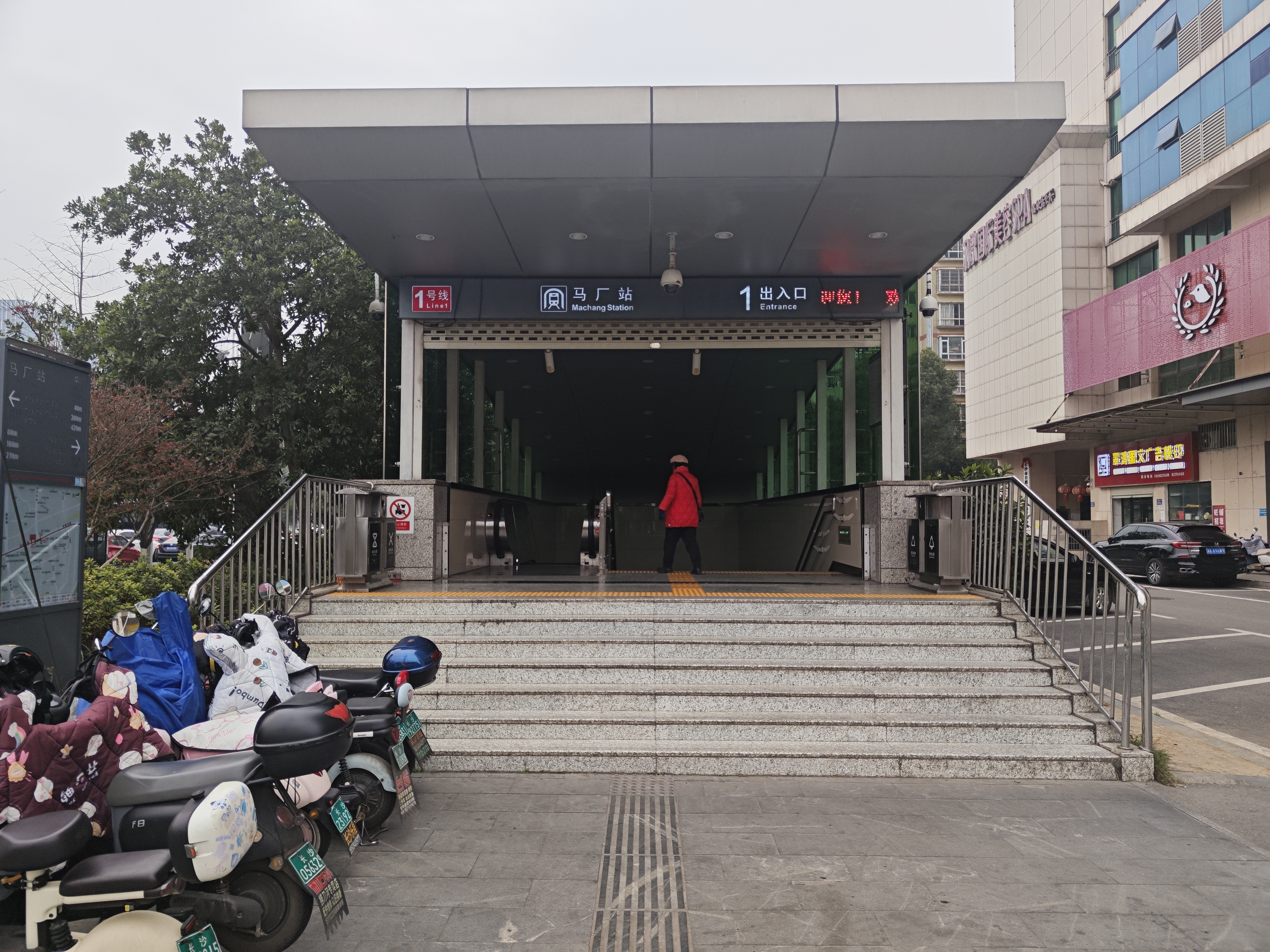
- Entrance No. 1 of Machang Station.

General information
- Location: Kaifu District, Changsha, Hunan; China
- Coordinates: 28°15′24″N 112°59′43″E
- Operated by: Changsha Metro
- Line: Line 1
- Platforms: 2 (2 side platforms)

History
- Opened: 28 June 2016; 9 years ago

Services
Preceding station	Changsha Metro	Following station
Kaifu District Government towards Jinpenqiu	Line 1	Beichen Delta towards Shangshuangtang
Location

Machang station is a subway station in Kaifu District, Changsha, Hunan, China, operated by the Changsha subway operator Changsha Metro.

== History ==
The station opened and entered revenue service on 28 June 2016.

== Layout ==
G		Exits
LG1	Concourse	Faregates, Station Agent
LG2	←	Line 1 towards Jinpenqiu (Kaifu District Government)
LG2	Island platform, doors open on the left
LG2		Line 1 towards Shangshuangtang (Beichen Delta)	→

== Surrounding area ==
- Fuyuanlu Bridge
- Entrance No. 1: Fayuan Village
- Entrance No. 2: Shuntian - Beiguo Fengguang Village
