= Kaifusi railway station =

Railway station in Changsha, China

Kaifusi / Kaifu Temple 开福寺
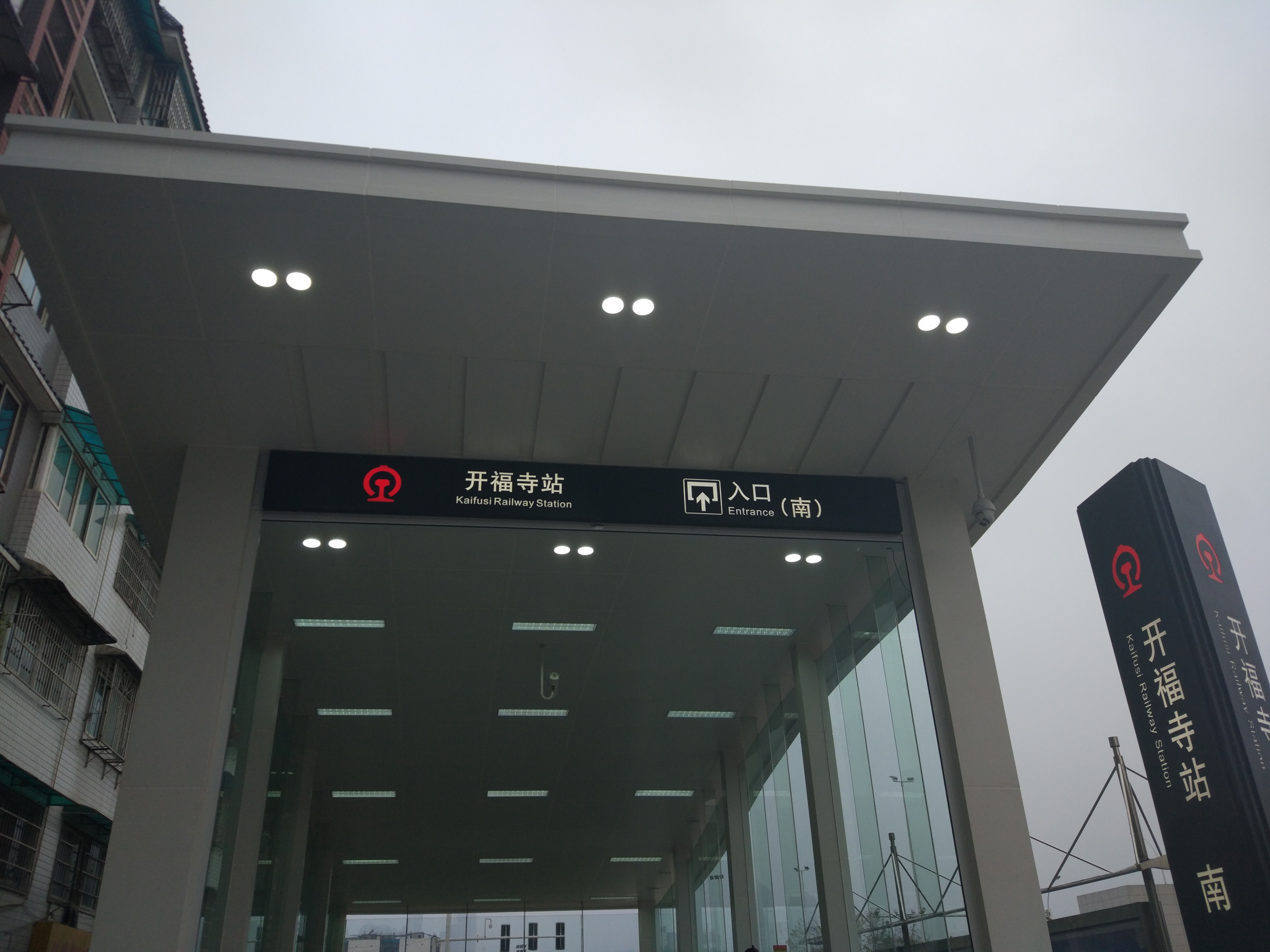

General information
- Location: Kaifu District, Changsha, Hunan; China
- Coordinates: 28°13′41″N 112°59′09″E
- Operator: CR Guangzhou; Changsha Metro

History
- Opened: 26 December 2017; 8 years ago 28 June 2016; 10 years ago
Location

Kaifusi (Kaifu Temple) station is a railway and subway station in Kaifu District, Changsha, Hunan, China, operated by CR Guangzhou and Changsha Metro. It opened its services on June 28, 2016. Kaifusi/ Temple Station offers interchange between Changsha-Zhuzhou-Xiangtan intercity railway and Changsha Metro Line 1. The metro station opened on 28 June 2016 while the railway station opened on 26 December 2017.

== China Railway ==
Kaifusi 开福寺
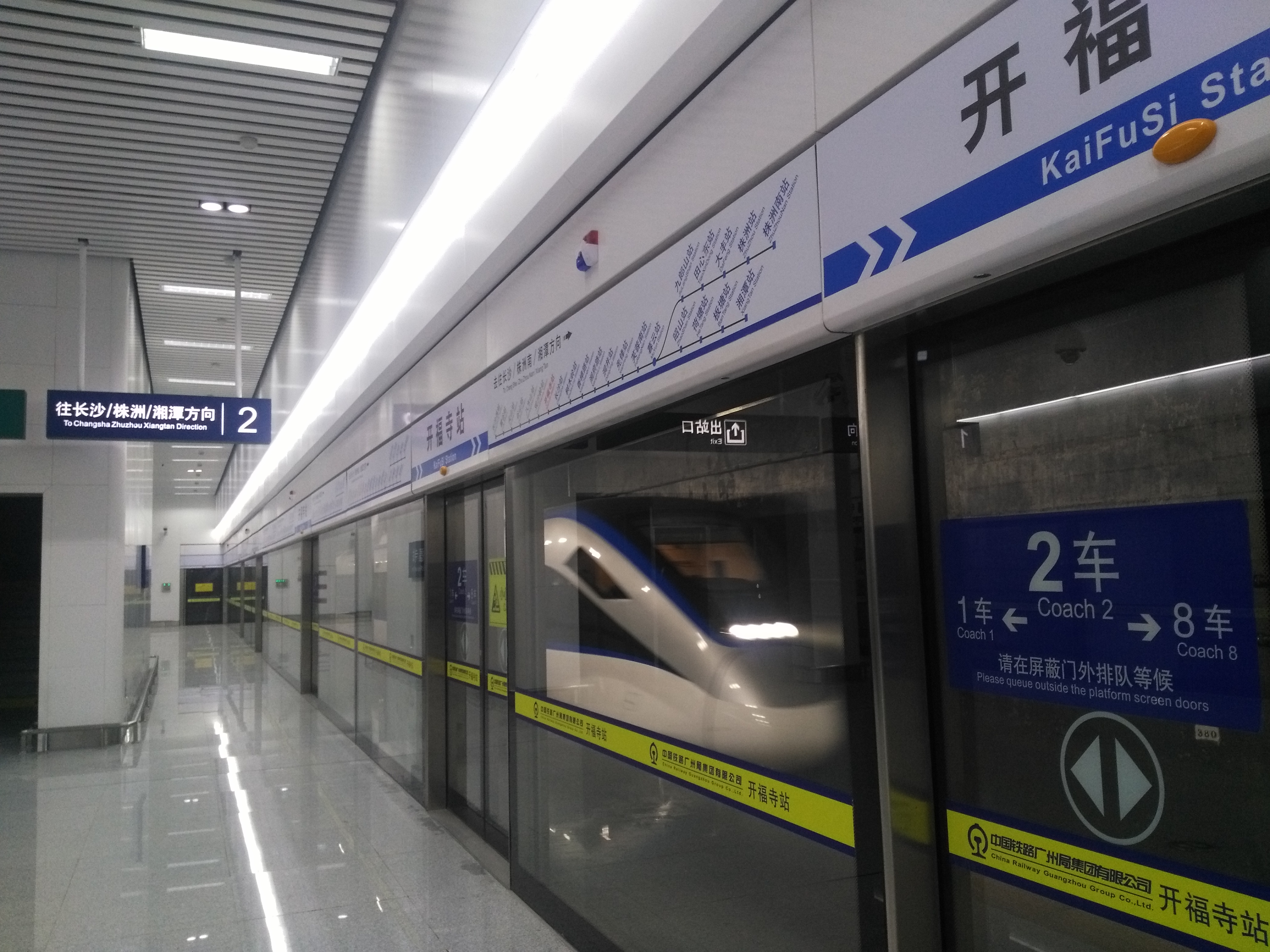
- Kaifusi station platform

General information
- Location: Kaifu District, Changsha, Hunan; China
- Operator: CR Guangzhou
- Line: Changsha-Zhuzhou-Xiangtan intercity railway

History
- Opened: 26 December 2017; 8 years ago
Location

Kaifusi station is a railway station in Kaifu District, Changsha, Hunan, China, operated by CR Guangzhou. It opened its services on 26 December 2017. Kaifusi station offers interchange to the Changsha Metro Line 1.

== Changsha Metro ==
Kaifu Temple Station 开福寺站
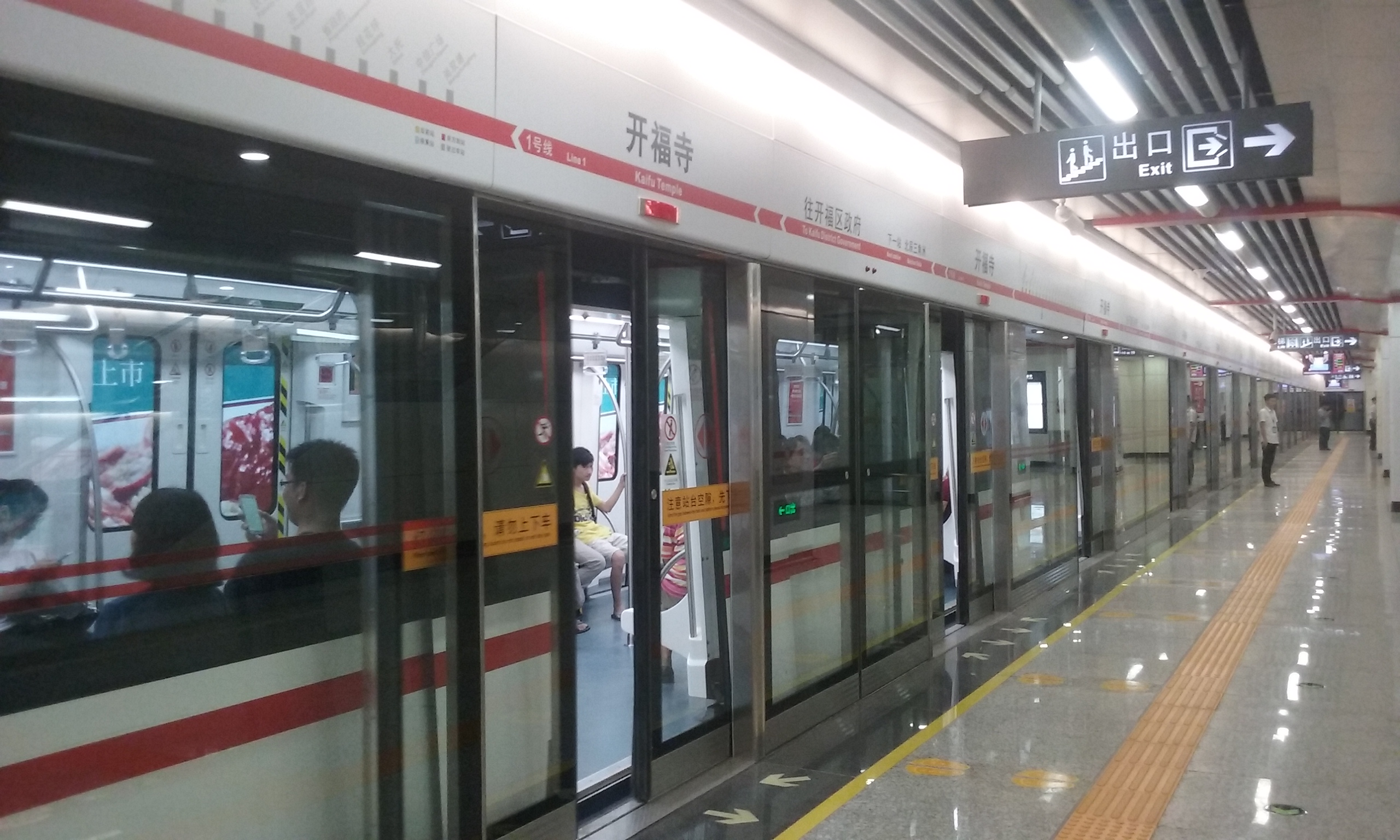
- Northbound train of Line 1 in Kaifu Temple Station.

General information
- Location: Kaifu District, Changsha, Hunan; China
- Operator: Changsha Metro
- Line: Line 1
- Platforms: 2 (1 island platform)

History
- Opened: 28 June 2016; 10 years ago

Services
Preceding station	Changsha Metro	Following station
Beichen Delta towards Jinpenqiu	Line 1	Wenchangge towards Shangshuangtang
Location

Kaifu Temple station is a subway station in Kaifu District, Changsha, Hunan, China, operated by the Changsha subway operator Changsha Metro. It opened its services on 28 June 2016. Kaifu Temple Station offers interchange to the Changsha-Zhuzhou-Xiangtan Intercity Railway.

=== Layout ===
G		Exits
LG1	Concourse	Faregates, Station Agent
LG2	←	Line 1 towards Jinpenqiu (Beichen Delta)
LG2	Island platform, doors open on the left
LG2		Line 1 towards Shangshuangtang (Wenchangge)	→

=== Surrounding area ===
- Entrance No. 1: Kaifu Temple
- Entrance No. 2: Zhushanyuan Village
