= Sulongqiao station =

Subway station on the Changsha Metro in Changsha, Hunan, China

Sulongqiao station 宿龙桥站
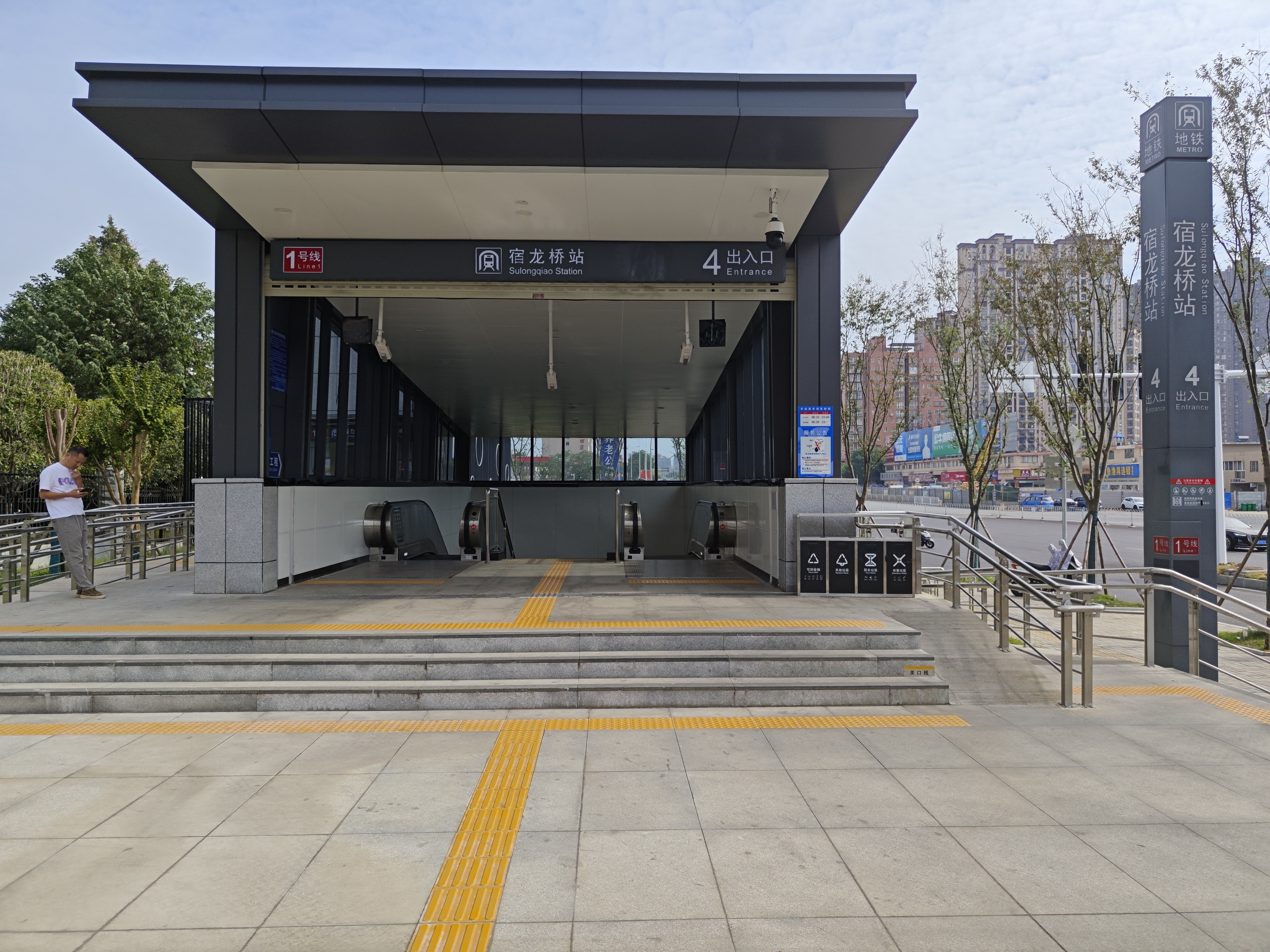
- Entrance 4

Chinese name
- Simplified Chinese: 宿龙桥站
- Traditional Chinese: 宿龍橋站
Transcriptions
Standard Mandarin
- Hanyu Pinyin: Sùlóngqiáo Zhàn

General information
- Location: Kaifu District, Changsha, Hunan; China
- Coordinates: 28°15′55.08″N 112°58′47.1″E
- Operated by: Changsha Metro
- Line(s): Line 1
- Platforms: 2 (1 island platform)

History
- Opened: 28 June 2024; 14 months ago

Services
Preceding station	Changsha Metro	Following station
Xiufengshan towards Jinpenqiu	Line 1	Kaifu District Government towards Shangshuangtang
Location

Sulongqiao station is a subway station in Kaifu District, Changsha, Hunan, China, operated by the Changsha subway operator Changsha Metro.

== History ==
The station was opened and entered revenue service on 28 June 2024.

== Surrounding area ==
- Jinwan Primary School (金湾小学)
