= Wenchangge station =

Changsha subway/metro station

Wenchangge Station 文昌阁站
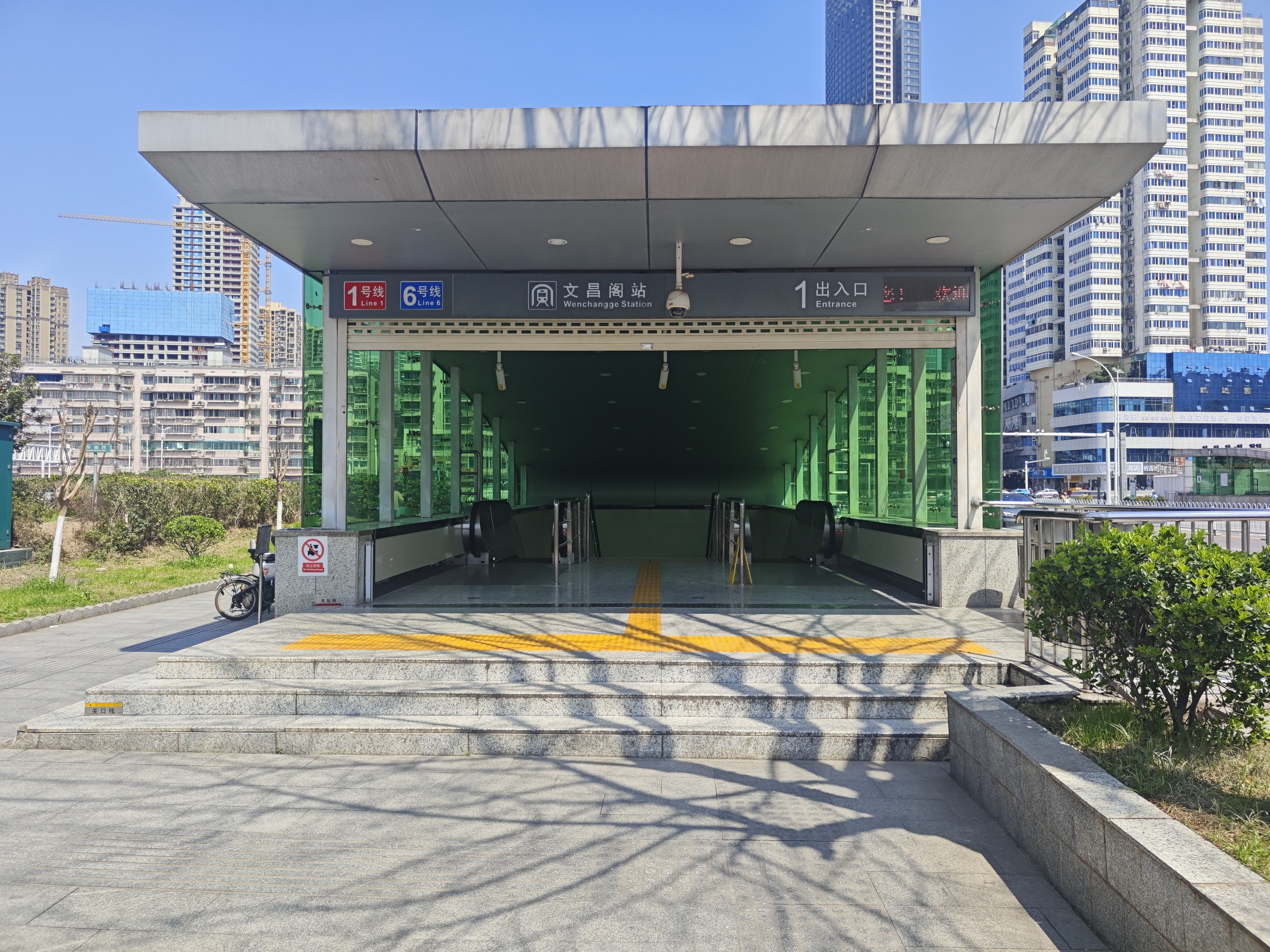
- Entrance No. 1 of Wenchangge Station.

General information
- Location: Kaifu District, Changsha, Hunan; China
- Coordinates: 28°13′09″N 112°59′06″E
- Operator: Changsha Metro
- Lines: Line 1 Line 6
- Platforms: 4 (2 island platforms)

History
- Opened: 28 June 2016; 10 years ago (Line 1); 28 June 2022; 4 years ago (Line 6)

Services
Preceding station	Changsha Metro	Following station
Kaifu Temple towards Jinpenqiu	Line 1	Peiyuanqiao towards Shangshuangtang
Liugoulong towards Xiejiaqiao	Line 6	Xiangya Hospital towards Huanghua Airport T1 & T2
Location

Wenchangge station is a subway station in Kaifu District, Changsha, Hunan, China, operated by the Changsha subway operator Changsha Metro. It entered revenue service on 28 June 2016. It later became an interchange on 28 June 2022 after the opening of Line 6.

== History ==
The station opened on 28 June 2016.

== Layout ==
G		Exits
LG1	Concourse	Faregates, Station Agent
LG2	←	Line 1 towards Jinpenqiu (Kaifu Temple)
LG2	Island platform, doors open on the left
LG2		Line 1 towards Shangshuangtang (Peiyuanqiao)	→
LG3	←	Line 6 towards Xiejiaqiao (Liugoulong)
LG3	Island platform, doors open on the left
LG3		Line 6 towards Huanghua Airport T1 & T2 (Xiangya Hospital)	→

== Surrounding area ==
- Entrance No. 1: Sanjiaotang School
- Entrance No. 3: South Campus of Changsha University, Changsha No. 8 High School
- Entrance No. 4: Site of Liu Tingfang Mansion
