= Eyangshan station =

Subway station on the Changsha Metro in Changsha, Hunan, China

Eyangshan station 鹅羊山站
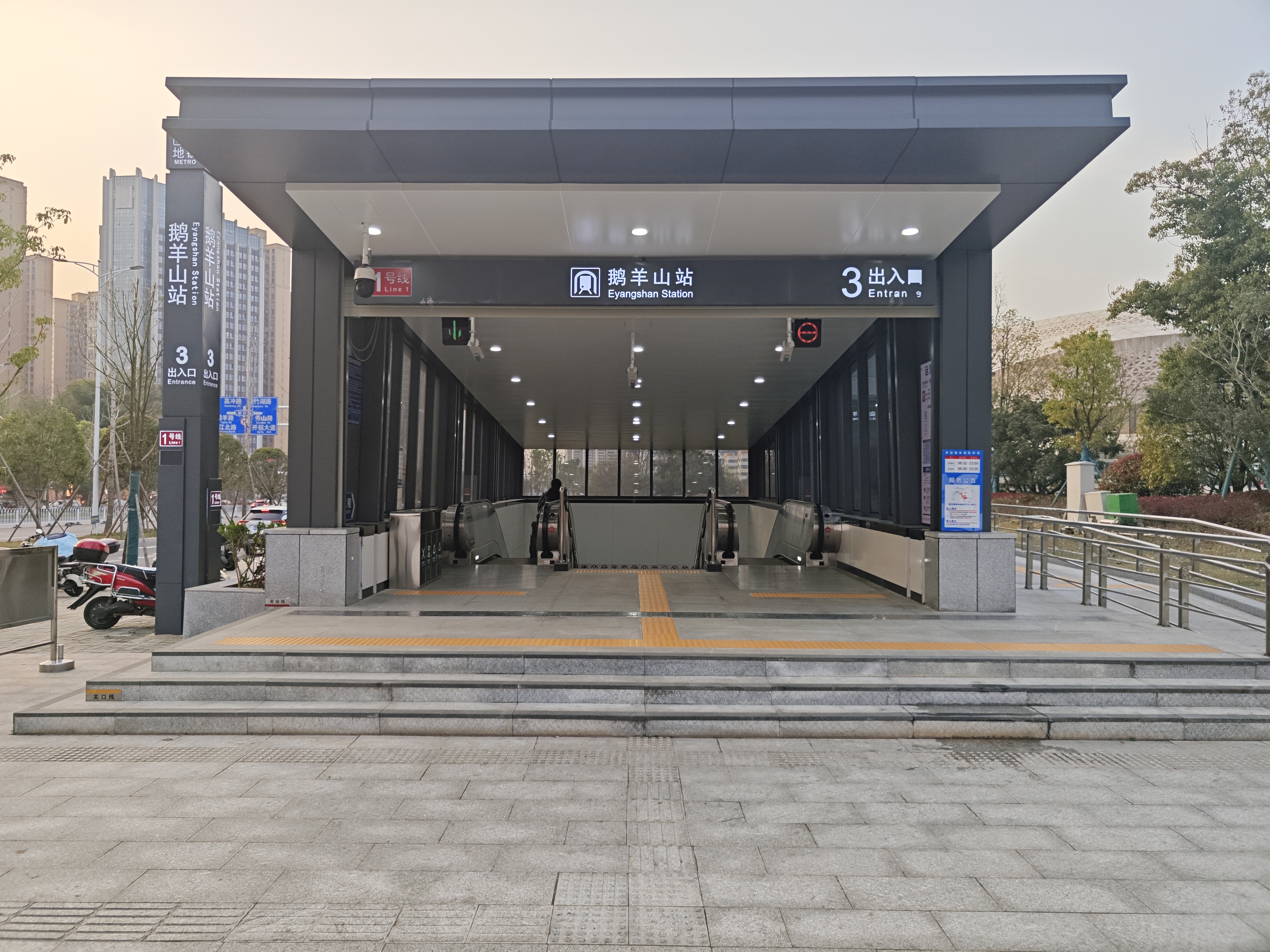
- Entrance 3

Chinese name
- Simplified Chinese: 鹅羊山站
- Traditional Chinese: 鵝羊山站
Transcriptions
Standard Mandarin
- Hanyu Pinyin: éyángshān Zhàn

General information
- Location: Kaifu District, Changsha, Hunan; China
- Coordinates: 28°18′52.114″N 112°57′13.352″E
- Operated by: Changsha Metro
- Line(s): Line 1
- Platforms: 2 (1 island platform)

History
- Opened: 28 June 2024; 14 months ago

Services
Preceding station	Changsha Metro	Following station
Jinxia towards Jinpenqiu	Line 1	Xiufengshan towards Shangshuangtang
Location

Eyangshan station is a subway station in Kaifu District, Changsha, Hunan, China, operated by the Changsha subway operator Changsha Metro.

== History ==
The station was opened and entered revenue service on 28 June 2024.

== Surrounding area ==
- Qingxiang No. 2 Primary School (清湘第二小学)
- Changjun Bilingual Qingxiang Experimental School (长郡双语清湘实验学校)
- Experimental Primary School of Kaifu District, Changsha (长沙开福区实验小学)
