= Datuo station =

Metro station in Changsha, China

Datuo Station 大托站
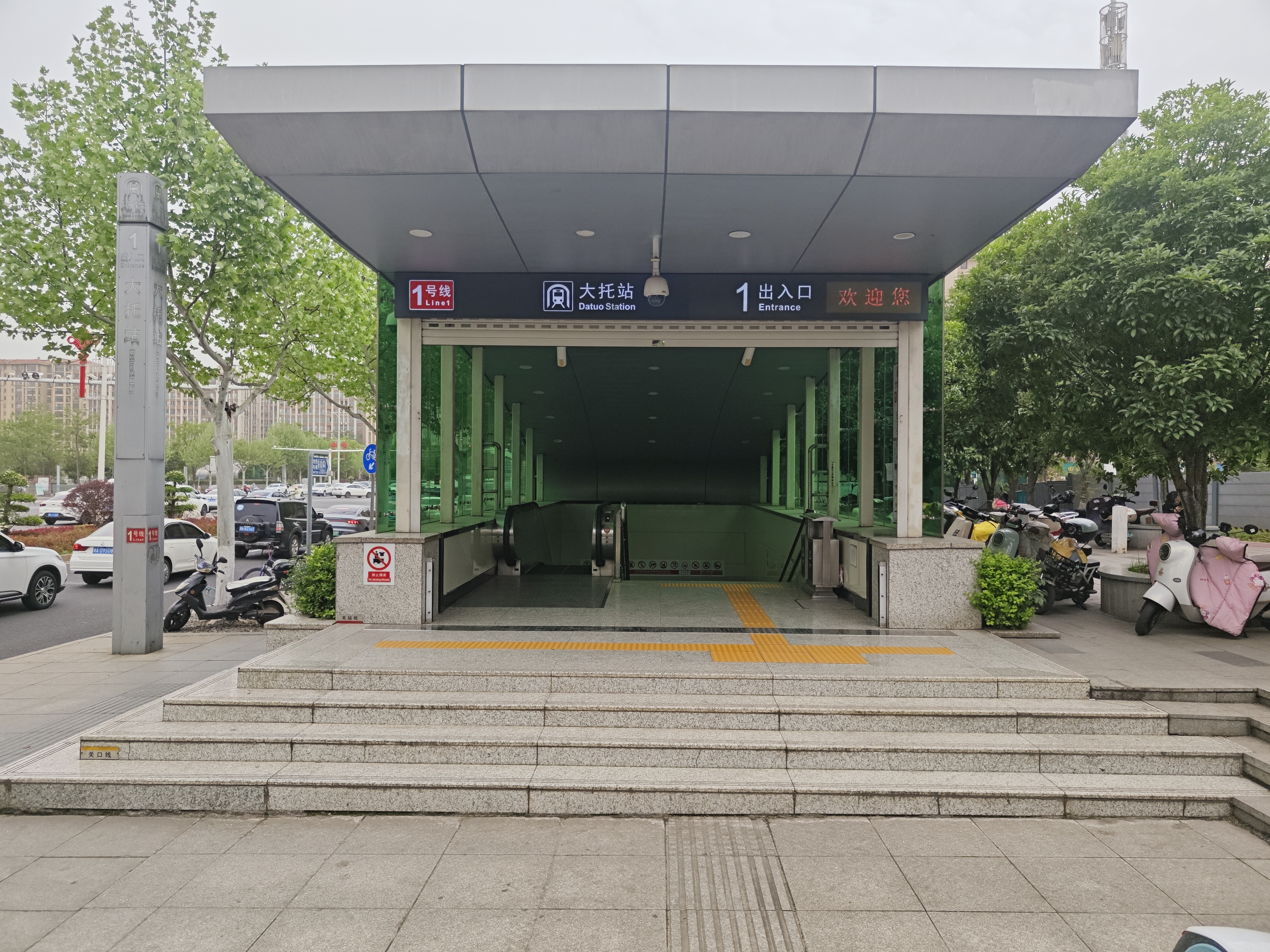
- Entrance No. 1 of Datuo Station

General information
- Location: Tianxin District, Changsha, Hunan; China
- Coordinates: 28°05′18″N 112°59′45″E
- Operated by: Changsha Metro
- Line: Line 1
- Platforms: 2 (1 island platform)

History
- Opened: 28 June 2016; 9 years ago

Services
Preceding station	Changsha Metro	Following station
Guihuaping towards Jinpenqiu	Line 1	Zhongxin Square towards Shangshuangtang
Location

Datuo station is a subway station in Tianxin District, Changsha, Hunan, China, operated by the Changsha subway operator Changsha Metro. It entered revenue service on June 28, 2016.

== History ==
The station opened on 28 June 2016.

== Layout ==
G		Exits
LG1	Concourse	Faregates, Station Agent
LG2	←	Line 1 towards Jinpenqiu (Guihuaping)
LG2	Island platform, doors open on the left
LG2		Line 1 towards Shangshuangtang (Zhongxin Square)	→

== Surrounding area ==
- Pitang School (披塘小学)
