= Huangxing Square station =

Metro station in Changsha, China

Huangxing Square Station 黄兴广场站
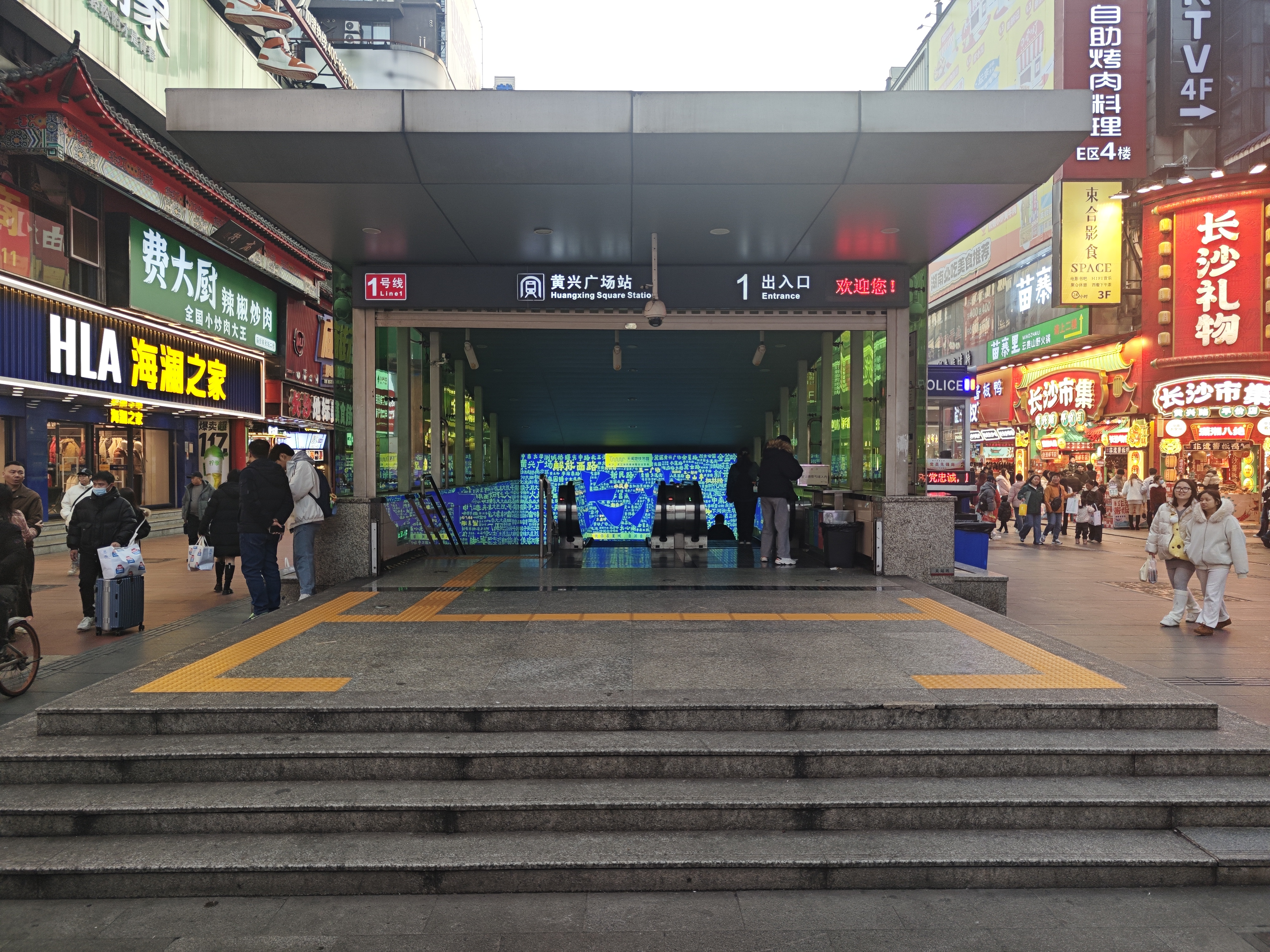
- Entrance No. 1 of Huangxing Square Station.

General information
- Location: Kaifu District/ Furong District/ Tianxin District, Changsha, Hunan; China
- Coordinates: 28°11′42″N 112°58′59″E
- Operated by: Changsha Metro
- Line: Line 1
- Platforms: 2 (1 island platform)

History
- Opened: 28 June 2016; 9 years ago

Services
| Preceding station | Changsha Metro | Following station |
|---|---|---|
| Wuyi Square towards Jinpenqiu | Line 1 | Nanmenkou towards Shangshuangtang |
Location

Huangxing Square station is a subway station in Kaifu District/ Furong District/ Tianxin District, Changsha, Hunan, China, operated by the Changsha subway operator Changsha Metro. It entered revenue service on June 28, 2016.

== History ==
The station opened on 28 June 2016.

== Layout ==
| G | | Exits |
| LG1 | Concourse | Faregates, Station Agent |
| LG2 | ← | Line 1 towards Jinpenqiu (Wuyi Square) |
| LG2 | Island platform, doors open on the left |
| LG2 | | Line 1 towards Shangshuangtang (Nanmenkou) | → |

== Surrounding area ==
- Entrance No. 1: Huángxīnglù Commercial Pedestrian Street
