= Tujiachong station =

Metro station in Changsha, China

Tujiachong Station 涂家冲站
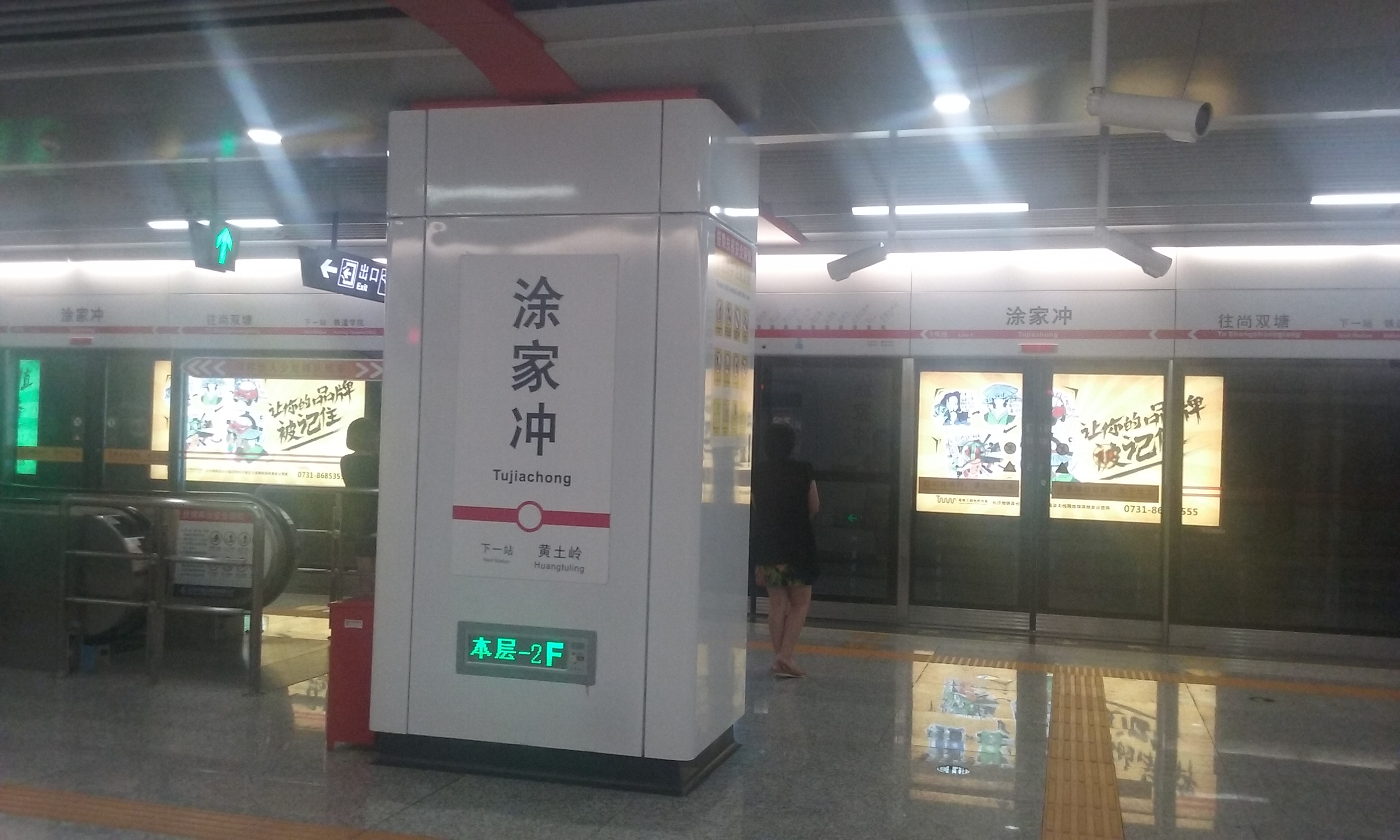
- Platform of Tujiachong Station

General information
- Location: Tianxin District/ Yuhua District, Changsha, Hunan; China
- Coordinates: 28°09′33″N 112°59′28″E
- Operated by: Changsha Metro
- Line: Line 1
- Platforms: 2 (1 island platform)

History
- Opened: 28 June 2016; 9 years ago

Services
Preceding station	Changsha Metro	Following station
Huangtuling towards Jinpenqiu	Line 1	Railway Campus towards Shangshuangtang
Location

Tujiachong station is a subway station in Tianxin District/ Yuhua District, Changsha, Hunan, China, operated by the Changsha subway operator Changsha Metro. It entered revenue service on June 28, 2016.

== History ==
The station opened on 28 June 2016.

== Layout ==
G		Exits
LG1	Concourse	Faregates, Station Agent
LG2	←	Line 1 towards Jinpenqiu (Huangtuling)
LG2	Island platform, doors open on the left
LG2		Line 1 towards Shangshuangtang (Railway Campus)	→

== Surrounding area ==
- Entrance No. 4: Hunan No. 2 Hospital, Hunan Meteorological Bureau
