= Beichen Delta station =

Metro station in Changsha, China

Beichen Delta station 北辰三角洲站
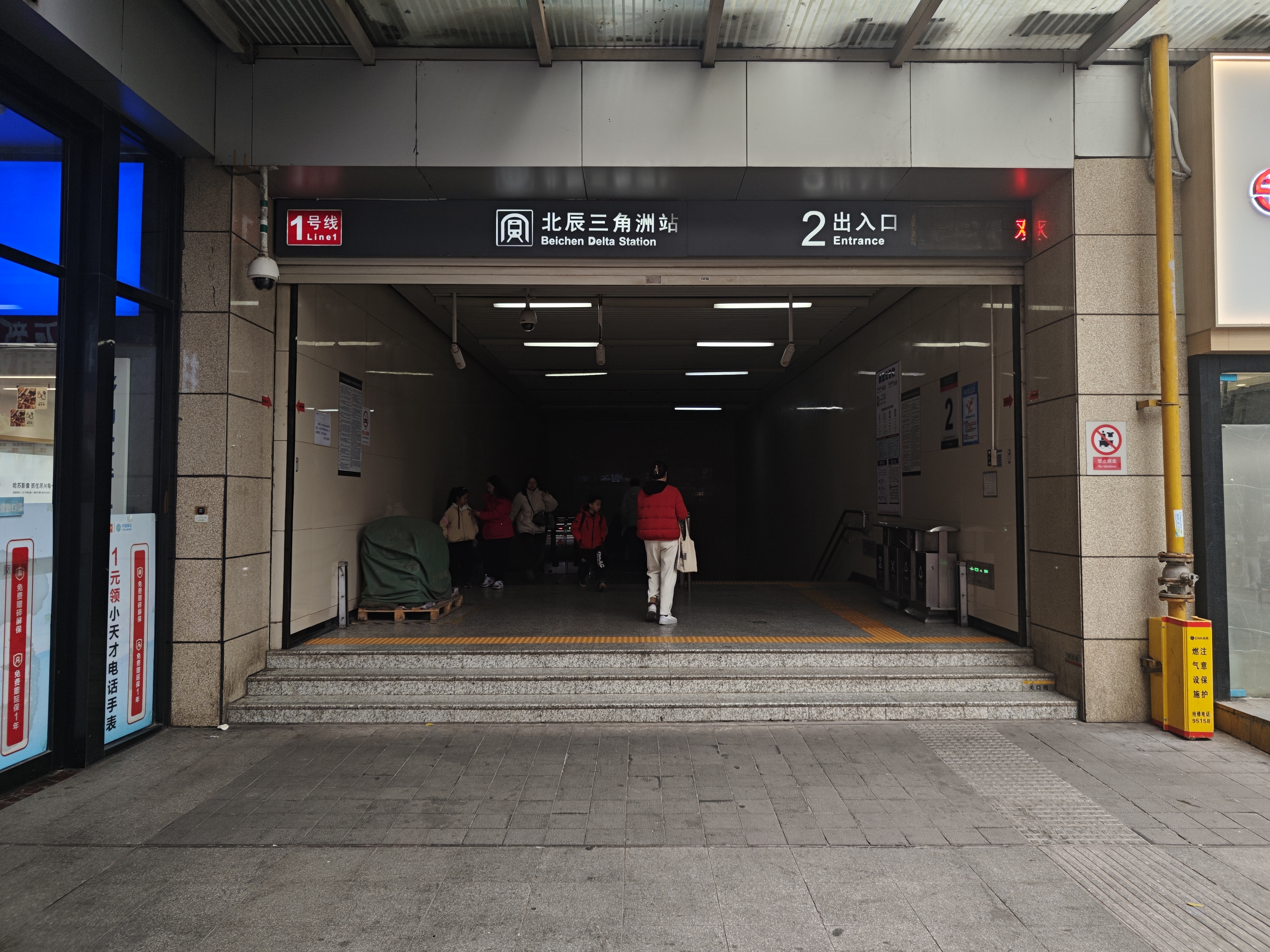
- Entrance No. 2 of Beichen Delta station.

General information
- Location: Kaifu District, Changsha, Hunan; China
- Coordinates: 28°14′30″N 112°59′25″E
- Operated by: Changsha Metro
- Line: Line 1
- Platforms: 2 (1 island platform)

History
- Opened: 28 June 2016; 9 years ago

Services
Preceding station	Changsha Metro	Following station
Machang towards Jinpenqiu	Line 1	Kaifu Temple towards Shangshuangtang
Location

Beichen Delta station is a subway station in Kaifu District, Changsha, Hunan, China, operated by the Changsha subway operator Changsha Metro.

== History ==
The station opened and entered revenue service on 28 June 2016.

== Layout ==
G		Exits
LG1	Concourse	Faregates, Station Agent
LG2	←	Line 1 towards Jinpenqiu (Machang)
LG2	Island platform, doors open on the left
LG2		Line 1 towards Shangshuangtang (Kaifu Temple)	→

== Surrounding area ==
- Entrance No. 2: Changsha Museum, Changsha Library, Changsha Concert Hall, Changsha Planning Exhibition Hall
- Entrance No. 3: Wujialing
