= Guihuaping station =

Metro station in Changsha, China

Guihuaping Station 桂花坪站
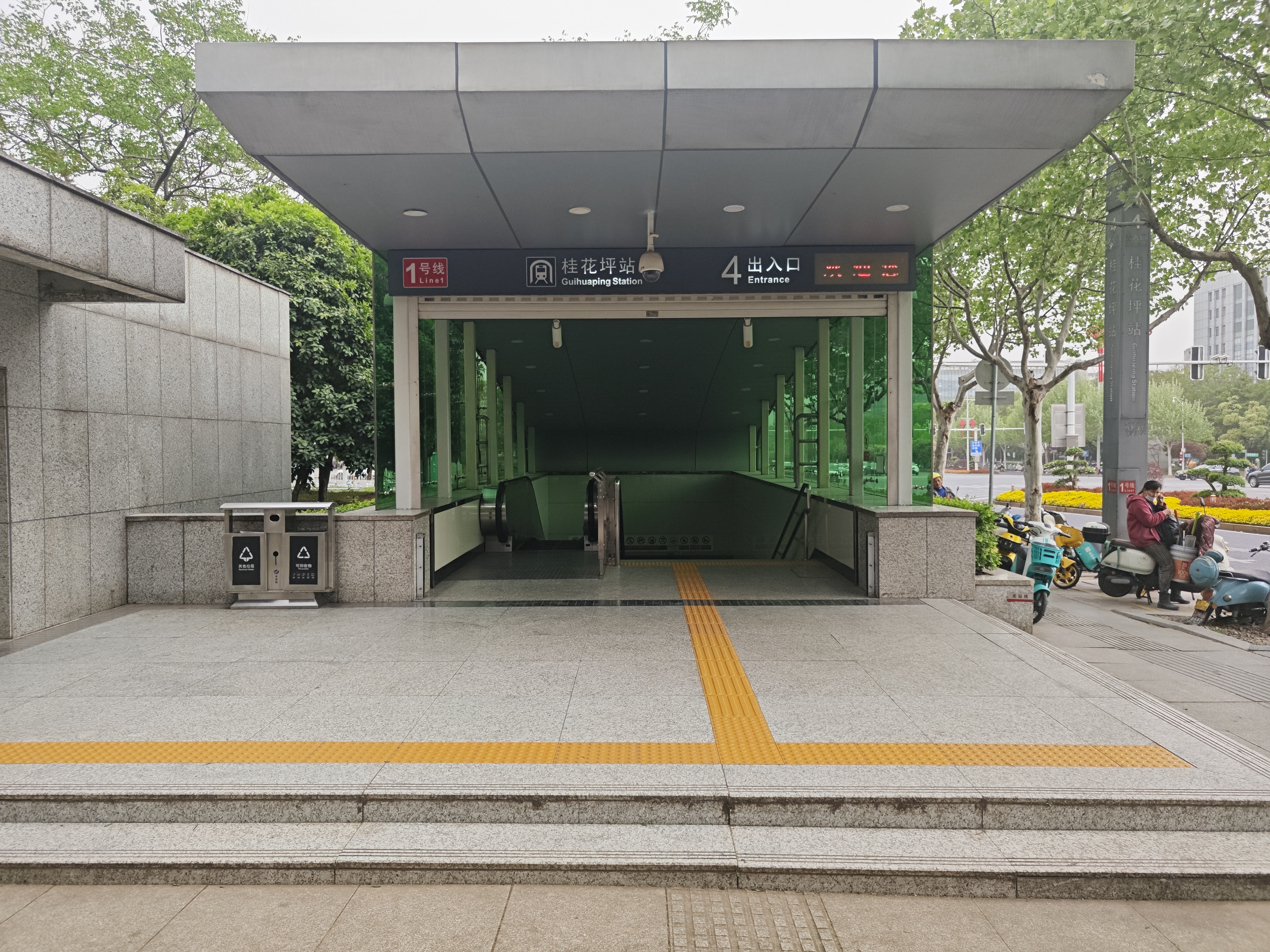
- Entrance No. 4 of Guihuaping Station.

General information
- Location: Tianxin District, Changsha, Hunan; China
- Coordinates: 28°06′17″N 112°59′42″E
- Operated by: Changsha Metro
- Line: Line 1
- Platforms: 2 (1 island platform)

History
- Opened: 28 June 2016; 9 years ago

Services
Preceding station	Changsha Metro	Following station
Provincial Government towards Jinpenqiu	Line 1	Datuo towards Shangshuangtang
Location

Guihuaping station is a subway station in Tianxin District, Changsha, Hunan, China, operated by the Changsha subway operator Changsha Metro. It entered revenue service on June 28, 2016.

== History ==
The station opened on 28 June 2016.

== Layout ==
G		Exits
LG1	Concourse	Faregates, Station Agent
LG2	←	Line 1 towards Jinpenqiu (Provincial Government)
LG2	Island platform, doors open on the left
LG2		Line 1 towards Shangshuangtang (Datuo)	→

== Surrounding area ==
- Entrance No. 2: Xiangfu Yingcai School (湘府英才小学), Modern Gloria Grand Hotel
- Entrance No. 3: Meidu Hotel (美度酒店)
