= Peiyuanqiao station =

Metro station in Changsha, China

Peiyuanqiao Station 培元桥站
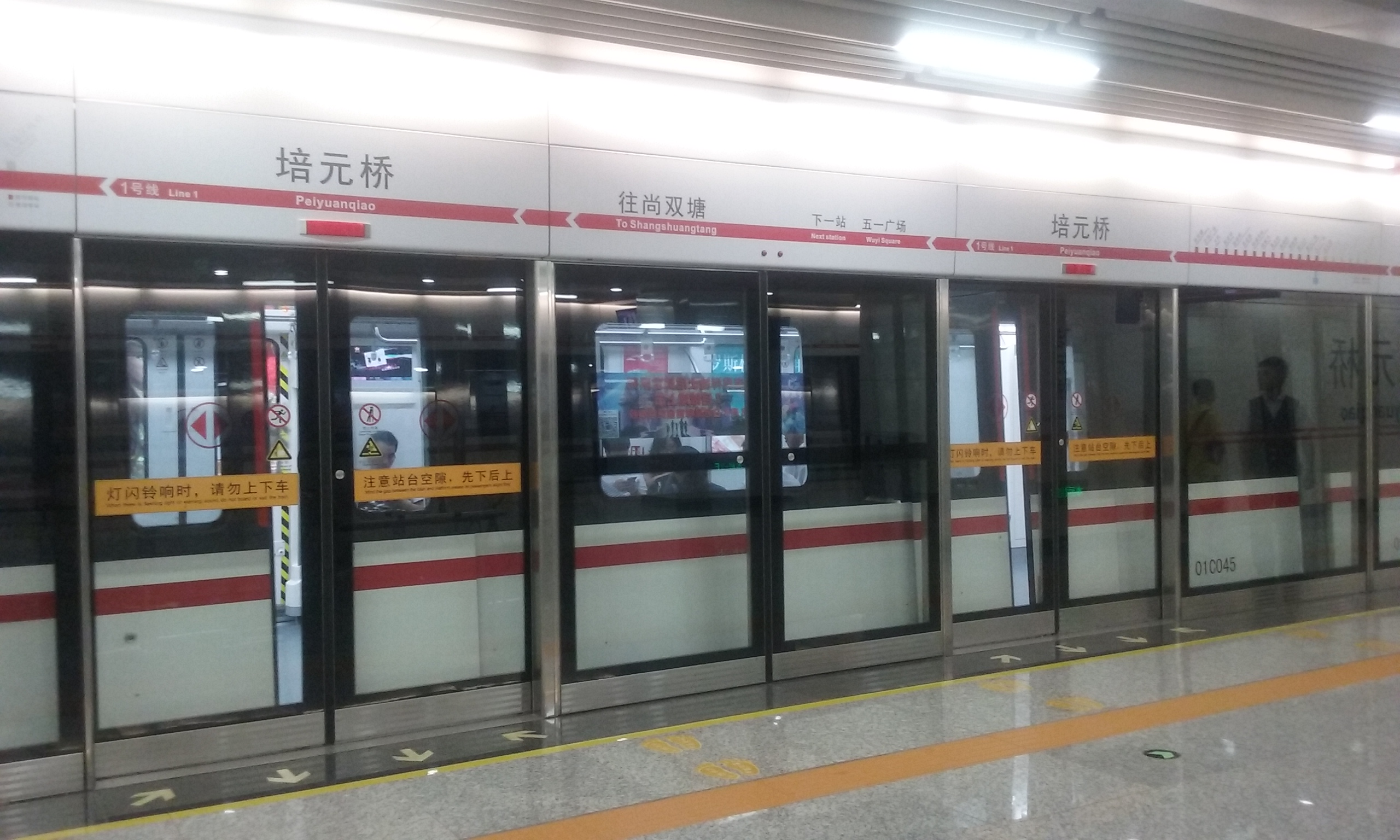
- Southbound Train of Line 1 in Peiyuanqiao Station.

General information
- Location: Kaifu District, Changsha, Hunan; China
- Coordinates: 28°12′43″N 112°58′59″E
- Operated by: Changsha Metro
- Line: Line 1
- Platforms: 2 (1 island platform)

History
- Opened: 28 June 2016; 9 years ago

Services
Preceding station	Changsha Metro	Following station
Wenchangge towards Jinpenqiu	Line 1	Wuyi Square towards Shangshuangtang
Location

Peiyuanqiao station is a subway station in Kaifu District, Changsha, Hunan, China, operated by the Changsha subway operator Changsha Metro.

== History ==
The station opened and entered service on 28 June 2016.

== Layout ==
G		Exits
LG1	Concourse	Faregates, Station Agent
LG2	Devices	Device storage
LG3	←	Line 1 towards Jinpenqiu (Wenchangge)
LG3	Island platform, doors open on the left
LG3		Line 1 towards Shangshuangtang (Wuyi Square)	→

== Surrounding area ==
- Changsha Zhounan Experimental School, Mingde School, Yingpanlu School
