= Xiufengshan station =

Subway station on the Changsha Metro in Changsha, Hunan, China

Xiufengshan station 秀峰山站
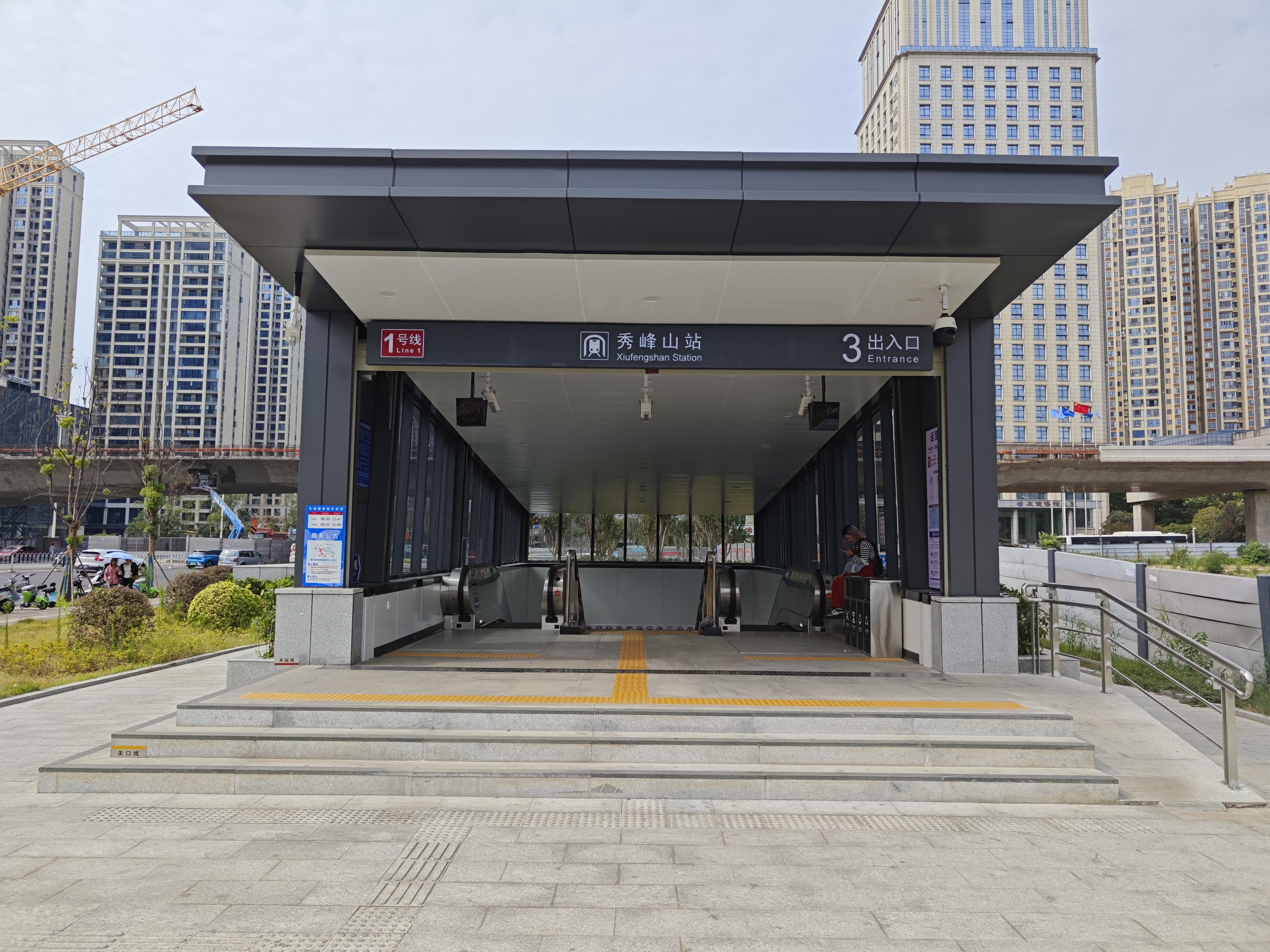
- Entrance 3

Chinese name
- Chinese: 秀峰山站
Transcriptions
Standard Mandarin
- Hanyu Pinyin: Xiùfēngshān Zhàn

General information
- Location: Wangcheng District/ Kaifu District, Changsha, Hunan; China
- Coordinates: 28°20′33″N 112°55′40″E
- Operated by: Changsha Metro
- Line: Line 1
- Platforms: 2 (1 island platform)

History
- Opened: 28 June 2024; 17 months ago

Services
Preceding station	Changsha Metro	Following station
Eyangshan towards Jinpenqiu	Line 1	Sulongqiao towards Shangshuangtang
Location

Xiufengshan station is a subway station in the border of Wangcheng District and Kaifu District, Changsha, Hunan, China, operated by the Changsha subway operator Changsha Metro.

== History ==
The station was opened and entered revenue service on 28 June 2024.

== Surrounding area ==
- Xiufeng Mountain Park
- Zhiyuan Primary School Affiliated to Changsha Normal University (长沙师范附属致远小学)
- Changjun Kaifu Middle School (长郡开福中学)
- Xinzhu No. 2 Primary School (新竹第二小学)
