= Changsha Concert Hall =

Cultural building in Changsha, Hunan, China

- 长沙音乐厅
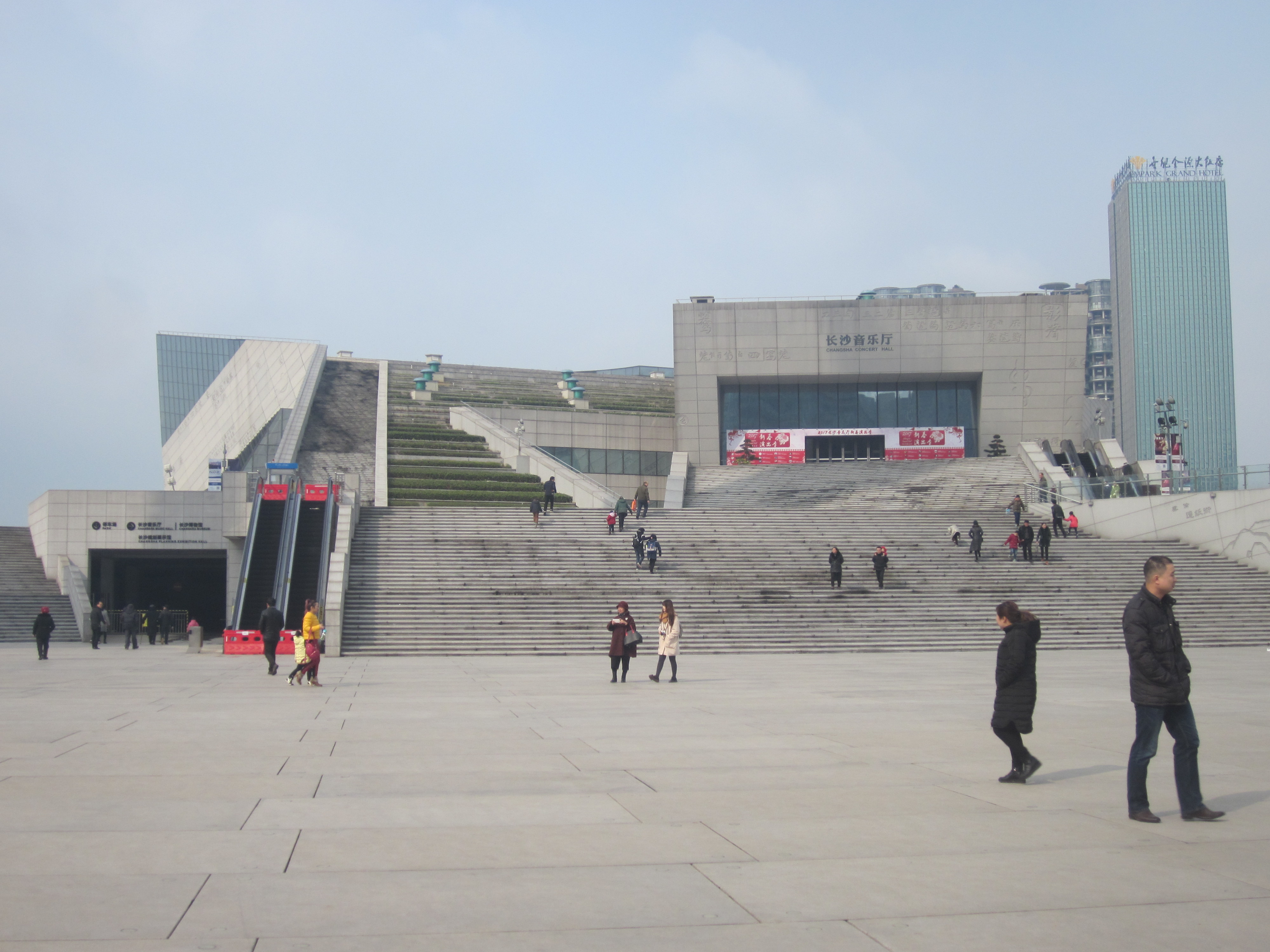
- Far view of Changsha Concert Hall

- Location within Hunan

General information
- Status: Completed
- Type: Performing arts centre
- Location: Kaifu District, Changsha, Hunan, China
- Coordinates: 28°14′51″N 112°59′10″E
- Groundbreaking: August 21, 2006
- Construction started: December 2007
- Completed: 2015
- Opened: December 28, 2015
- Owner: Changsha government

Technical details
- Material: Cement
- Floor area: 28,161-square-metre (303,120 sq ft)

Website
- csyyt.polyt.cn

Changsha Concert Hall (simplified Chinese: 长沙音乐厅; traditional Chinese: 長沙音樂廳; pinyin: Chángshā Yīnyuètīng) is located at Beichen Delta in Kaifu District of Changsha, Hunan. It is adjacent to the Changsha Museum, Changsha Planning Exhibition Hall and Changsha Library. It has a constructed area of 28,161 square metres (303,120 sq ft).

== History ==
The foundation stone for Changsha Concert Hall was laid on August 21, 2006. In December 2007, the construction project of Changsha Concert Hall was officially launched. On December 28, 2015, Changsha Concert Hall held its first performance.

== Performance venues and facilities ==
Changsha Concert Hall has four floors. The first floor is an actor and logistics office, VIP and other functional rooms. The second floor is leisure and exhibition space for visitors to visit. The third floor is the audience entrance, which can overlook the whole concert hall interior scene. The fourth floor is the concert hall. The exterior wall pattern of Changsha Concert Hall is based on a famous song Xiaoxiang Shuiyun (Chinese: 潇湘水云; lit. 'Water and Cloud in Xiaoxiang (Hunan)') written by a Southern Song dynasty (1127–1279) violinist, composer and educator named Guo Mian (Chinese: 郭沔), when he visited Hengyang.

=== Concert Hall ===
- Symphony Hall: Consists of 1446 seats, it is the main part.
- Multi-functional Concert Hall: Consists of 490 seats, it is an important part.
- Indoor Concert Hall: Consists of 298 seats, it is an important part.

== Transportation ==
- Take subway Line 1 to get off at Beichen Delta Station.
- Take bus No. 11 or 106 to Liangguan Yiting Bus Stop (两馆一厅站)
