= Jinxia station =

Subway station on the Changsha Metro in Changsha, Hunan, China

Jinxia station 金霞站
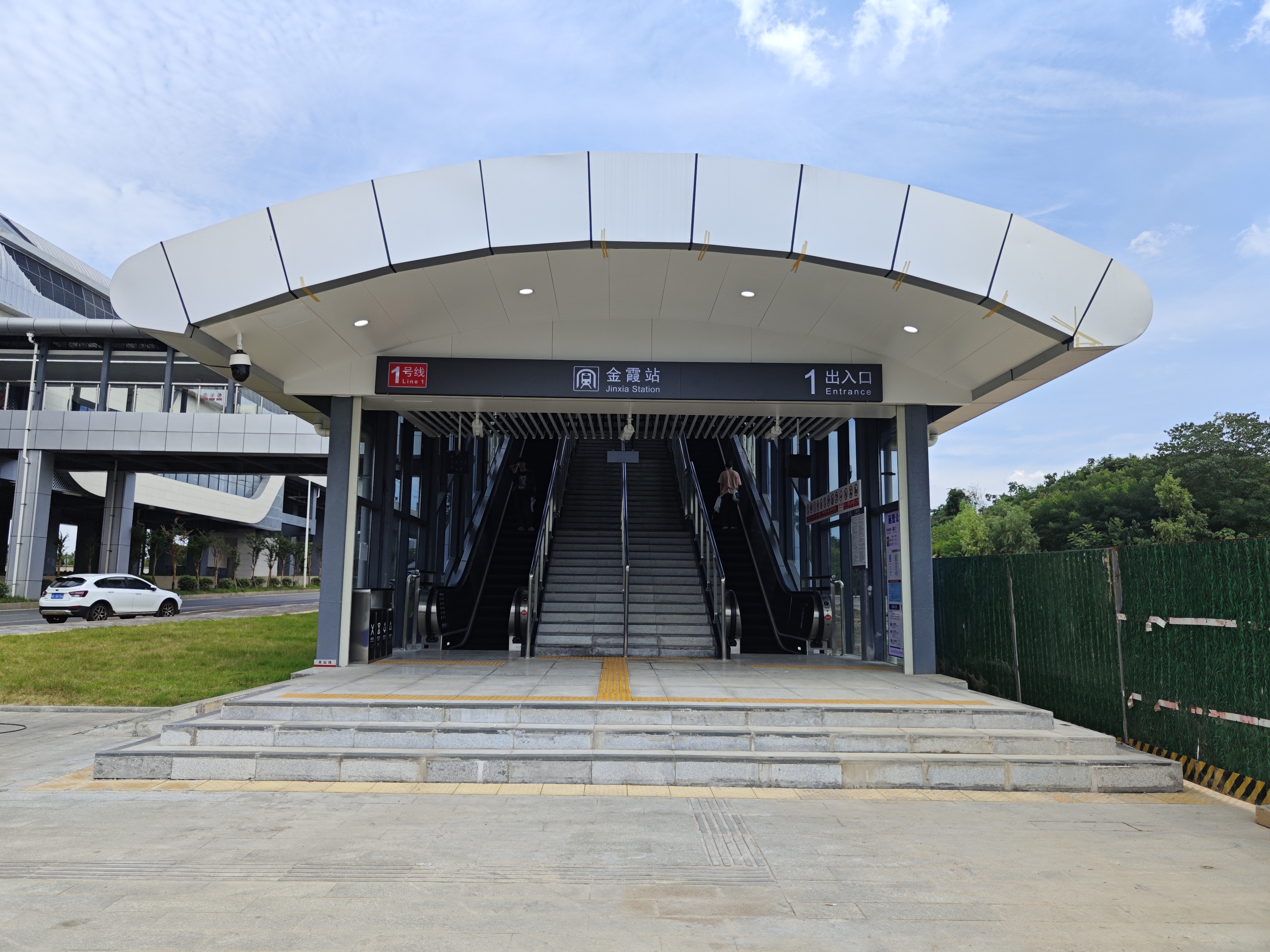
- Entrance 1

Chinese name
- Chinese: 金霞站
Transcriptions
Standard Mandarin
- Hanyu Pinyin: Jīnxiá Zhàn

General information
- Location: Kaifu District, Changsha, Hunan; China
- Coordinates: 28°19′42.859″N 112°56′27.535″E
- Operated by: Changsha Metro
- Line: Line 1
- Platforms: 2 (1 island platform)

History
- Opened: 28 June 2024; 16 months ago

Services
Preceding station	Changsha Metro	Following station
Jinpenqiu Terminus	Line 1	Eyangshan towards Shangshuangtang
Location

Jinxia station is a subway station in Kaifu District, Changsha, Hunan, China, operated by the Changsha subway operator Changsha Metro.

== History ==
The station was opened and entered revenue service on 28 June 2024.

== Surrounding area ==
- Changsha Port
- Changsha Foreign Tourism Vocational Secondary School (长沙涉外旅游职业中专)
