= Youyi Road station (Changsha Metro) =

Metro station in Changsha, China

Youyi Road Station 友谊路站
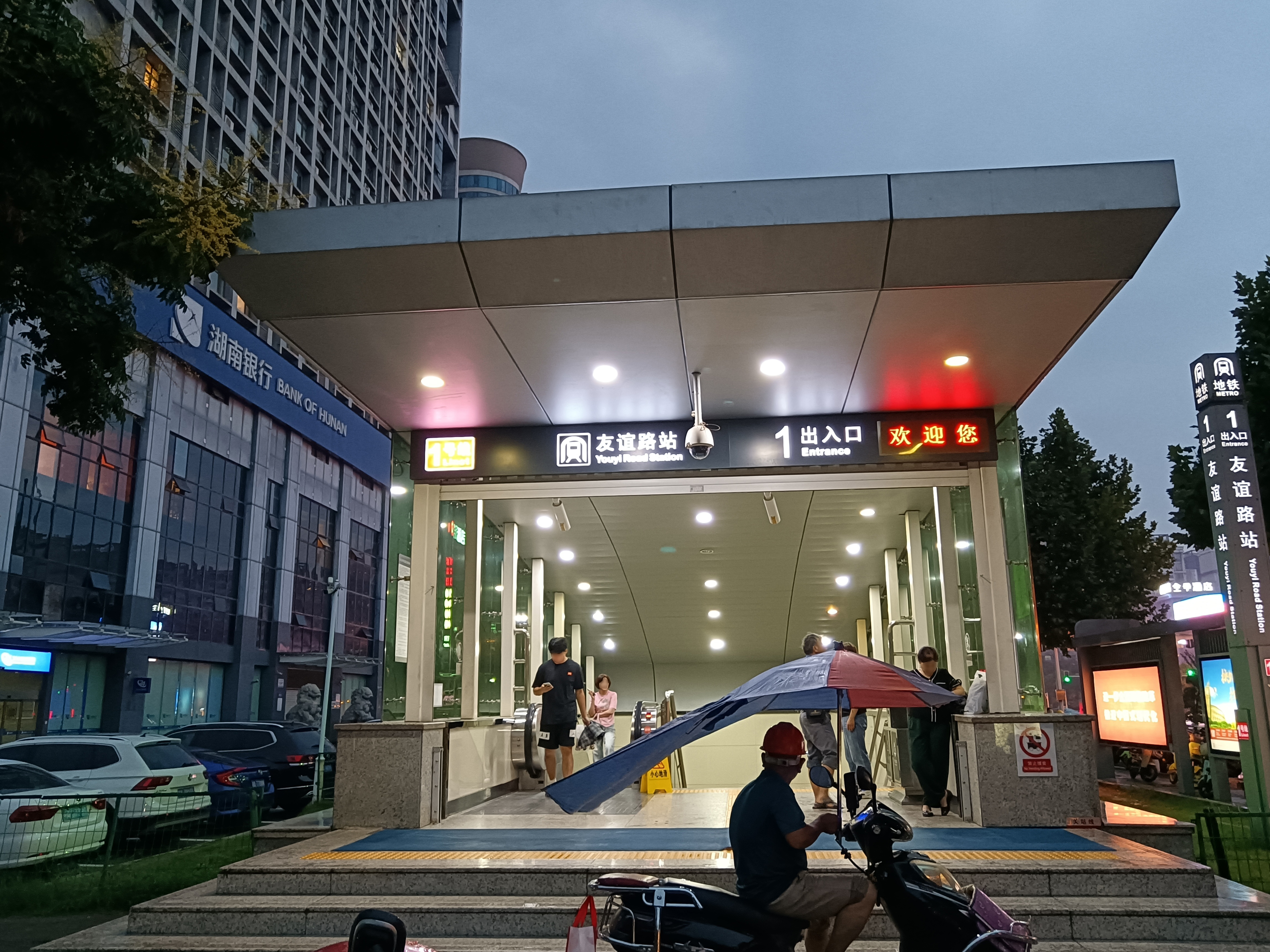
- Entrance 1 of Youyi Road Station

General information
- Location: Tianxin District, Changsha, Hunan; China
- Coordinates: 28°07′48″N 112°59′36″E
- Operated by: Changsha Metro
- Line: Line 1
- Platforms: 2 (1 island platform)

History
- Opened: 28 June 2016; 9 years ago

Services
| Preceding station | Changsha Metro | Following station |
|---|---|---|
| Railway Campus towards Jinpenqiu | Line 1 | Provincial Government towards Shangshuangtang |
Location

Youyi Road station is a subway station in Tianxin District, Changsha, Hunan, China, operated by the Changsha subway operator Changsha Metro. It entered revenue service on June 28, 2016.

== History ==
The station opened on 28 June 2016.

== Layout ==
| G | | Exits |
| LG1 | Concourse | Faregates, Station Agent |
| LG2 | ← | Line 1 towards Jinpenqiu (Railway Campus) |
| LG2 | Island platform, doors open on the left |
| LG2 | | Line 1 towards Shangshuangtang (Provincial Government) | → |

== Surrounding area ==
- Yongxi Building (永熙大厦)
- Hunan Taxation Bureau
- Hunan Construction Engineering Group Corporation
