= Youyi Road station =

Youyi Road station may refer to:

- Youyi Road station (Changsha Metro), a station in Hunan, China
- Youyi Road station (Shanghai Metro), a station on the Shanghai Metro in Shanghai
- Youyi Road station (Wuhan Metro), a station on the Wuhan Metro in Hubei, China
