= Zhongxin Square station =

Subway station in Tianxin District, Changsha, Hunan, China

Zhongxin Square Station 中信广场站
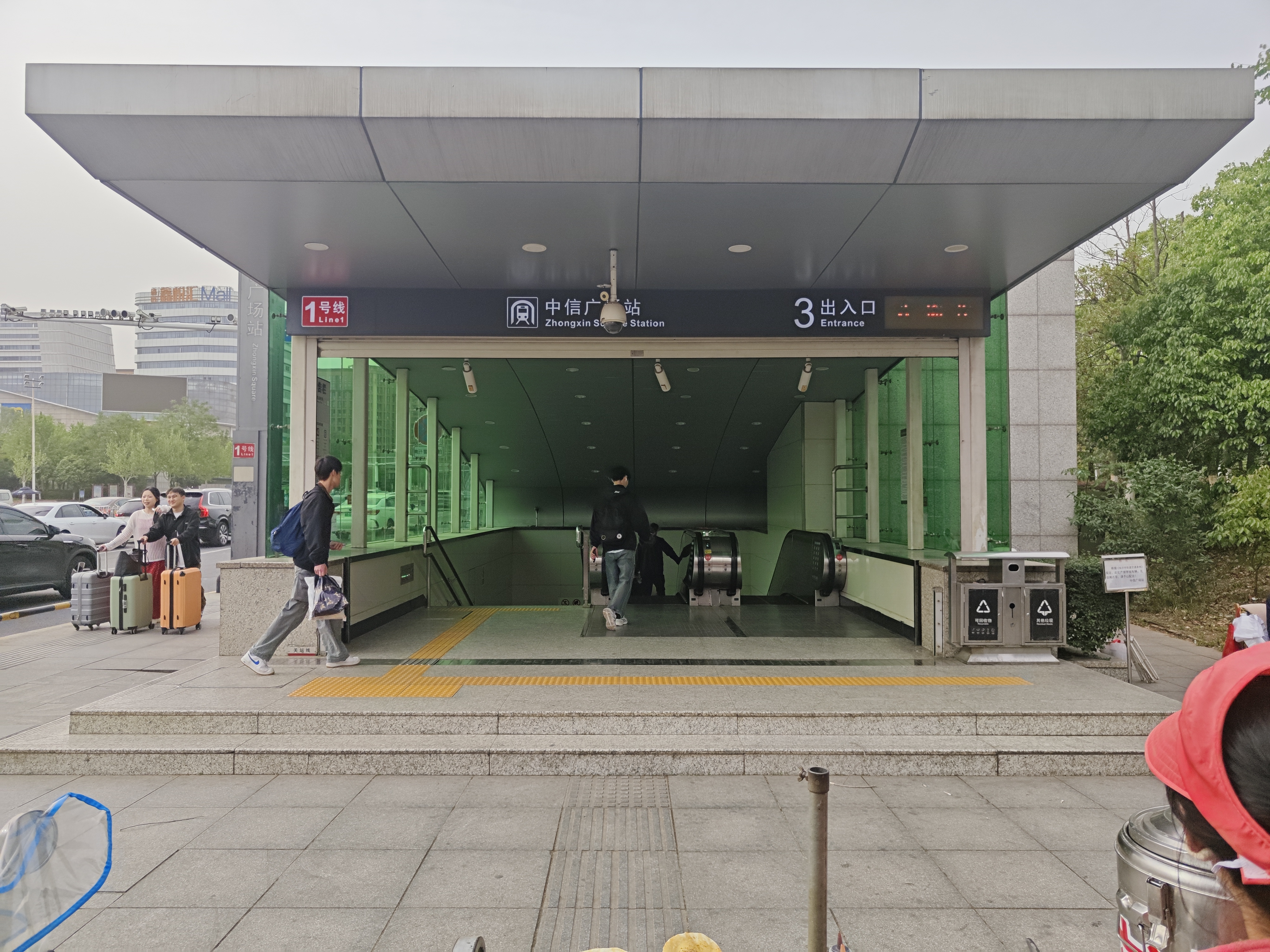
- Entrance No.3 of Zhongxin Square Station

General information
- Location: Tianxin District, Changsha, Hunan; China
- Coordinates: 28°04′46″N 112°59′47″E
- Operator: Changsha Metro
- Line: Line 1
- Platforms: 2 (1 island platform)

History
- Opened: 28 June 2016; 10 years ago

Services
Preceding station	Changsha Metro	Following station
Datuo towards Jinpenqiu	Line 1	Shangshuangtang Terminus
Location

Zhongxin Square station is a subway station in Tianxin District, Changsha, Hunan, China, operated by the Changsha subway operator Changsha Metro. It entered revenue service on June 28, 2016.

== History ==
The station opened on 28 June 2016.

== Layout ==
G		Exits
LG1	Concourse	Faregates, Station Agent
LG2	←	Line 1 towards Jinpenqiu (Datuo)
LG2	Island platform, doors open on the left
LG2		Line 1 towards Shangshuangtang (Terminus)	→

== Surrounding area ==
- Entrance No. 4: Xiangfu Middle School (湘府中学), Changsha No. 35 High School (长沙市第三十五中学)
