= Provincial Government station =

Metro station in Changsha, China

Provincial Government Station 省政府站
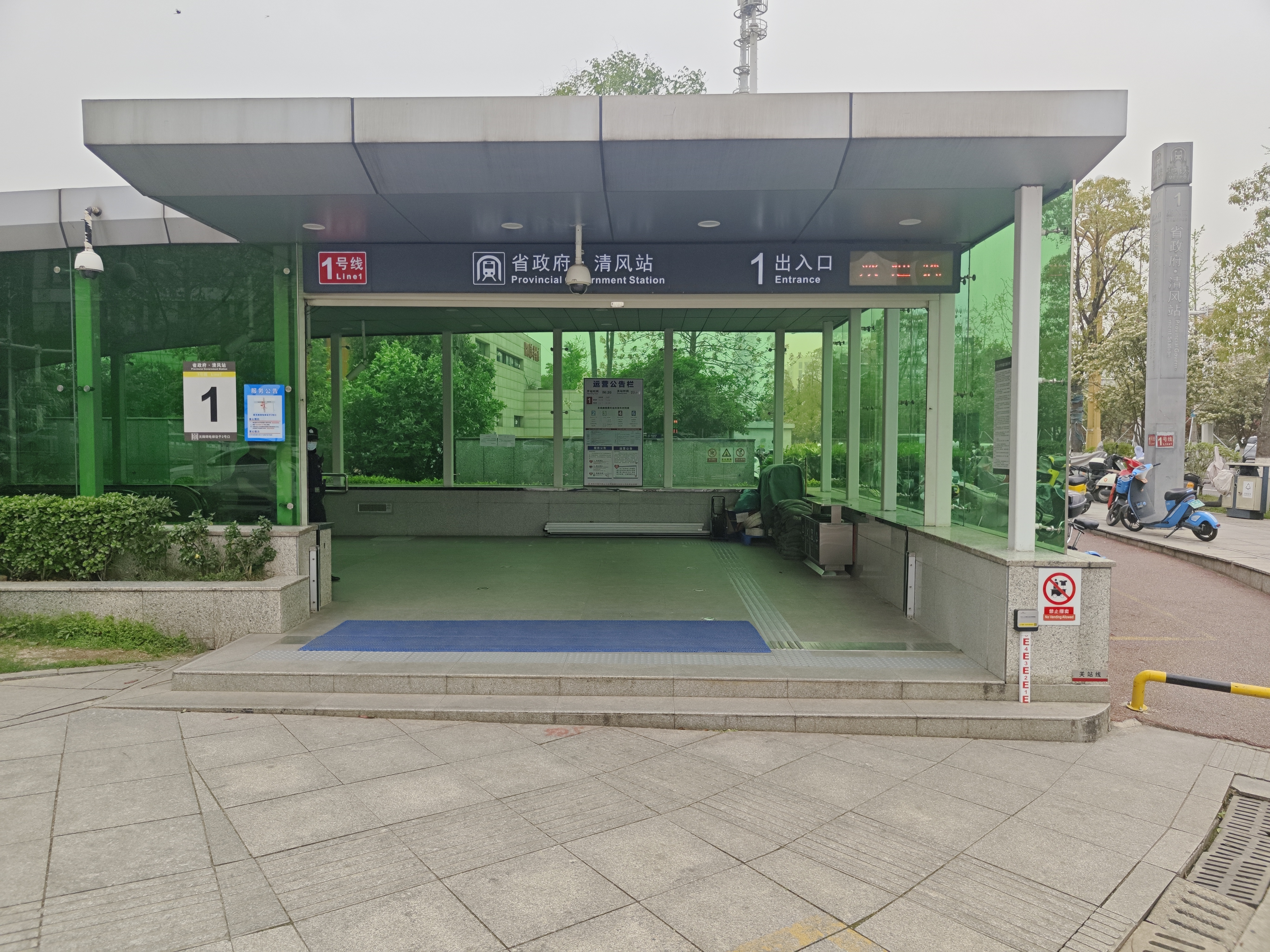
- Entrance No.1 of Provincial Government station.

General information
- Location: Tianxin District, Changsha, Hunan; China
- Coordinates: 28°07′00″N 112°59′39″E
- Operated by: Changsha Metro
- Line: Line 1
- Platforms: 2 (1 island platform)

History
- Opened: 28 June 2016; 9 years ago

Services
Preceding station	Changsha Metro	Following station
Youyi Road towards Jinpenqiu	Line 1	Guihuaping towards Shangshuangtang
Location

Provincial Government station is a subway station in Tianxin District, Changsha, Hunan, China, operated by the Changsha subway operator Changsha Metro. It entered revenue service on June 28, 2016.

== History ==
The station opened on 28 June 2016.

== Layout ==
G		Exits
LG1	Concourse	Faregates, Station Agent
LG2	←	Line 1 towards Jinpenqiu (Youyi Road)
LG2	Island platform, doors open on the left
LG2		Line 1 towards Shangshuangtang (Guihuaping)	→

== Surrounding area ==
- Entrance No. 1: Hunan Provincial Government
- Entrance No. 2: Xiangfu Cultural Park (湘府文化公园), Hunan Provincial Art Museum, Hunan Cultural Affairs
- Entrance No. 2: Changsha Xingcheng Rongyu Hotel (长沙星城荣域酒店)
- Entrance No. 4: Tianxin District Government
