= Changsha Library =

Public library in Hunan, China

- 长沙图书馆
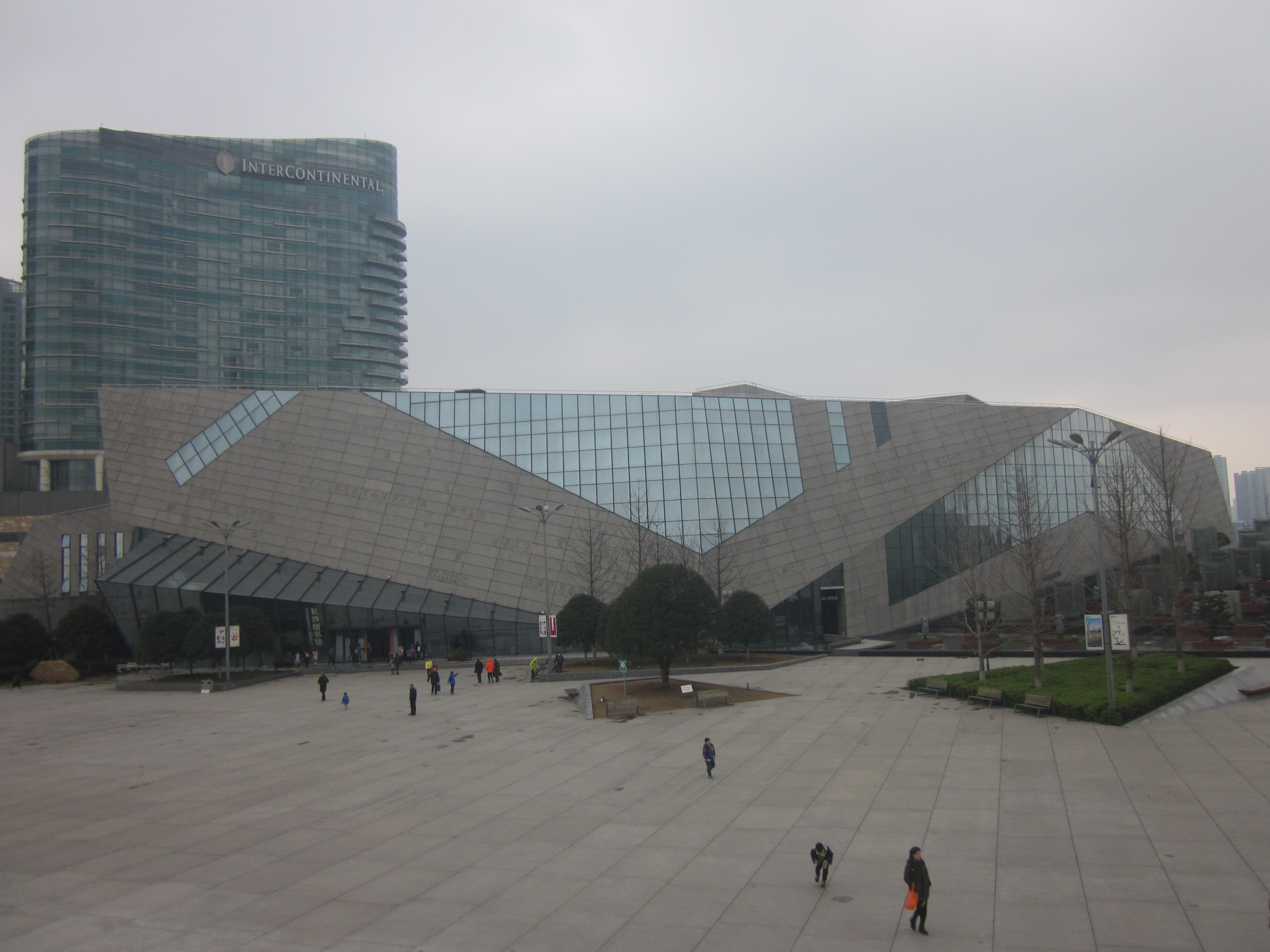
- 28°14′51″N 112°59′09″E
- Location: Beichen Delta, Kaifu District, Changsha, Hunan, China
- Type: Public
- Established: 1960

Collection
- Items collected: 1 million items

Other information
- Website: www.changshalib.cn

The Changsha Library (simplified Chinese: 长沙图书馆; traditional Chinese: 長沙圖書館; pinyin: Chángshā Túshūguǎn) is a public library located at Beichen Delta, in Kaifu District, Changsha, Hunan. Changsha Library has a collection of over 1 million items, with 31 thousand newspapers, 42 thousand audiovisual literatures, 8,900 ancient books, and 13 thousand local documents.

== History ==
Changsha Library was formed in 1960 at Dingwangtai (定王台), in downtown Changsha.

In December 2015, the new building of Changsha Library was officially opened to the public. Covering an area of 31,300 square metres (337,000 sq ft), it has five floors.
