= Line 1 (Changsha Metro) =

Metro line in Changsha, China

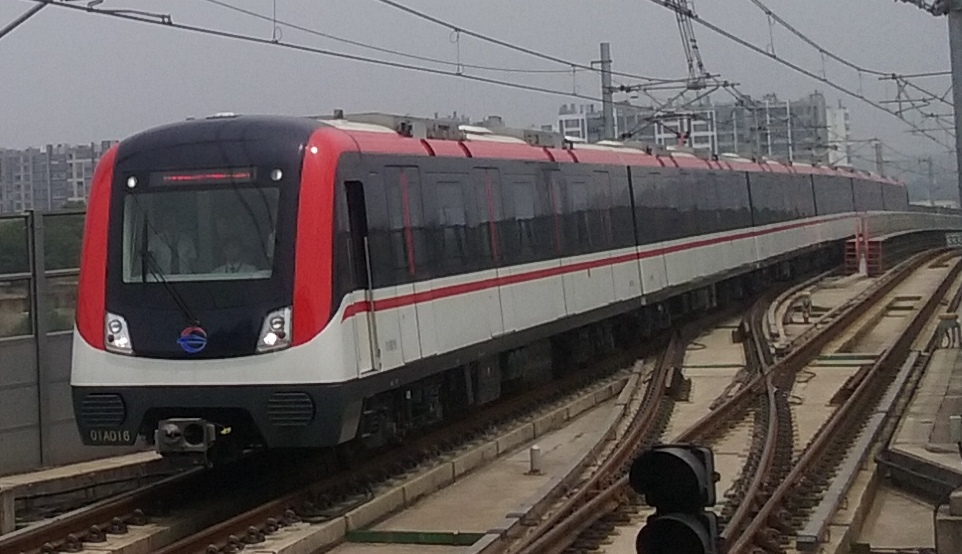
- Line 1 train arriving at Shangshuangtang station

Overview
- Status: Operational
- Owner: Changsha Government
- Locale: Changsha, Hunan, China
- Termini: Jinpenqiu; Shangshuangtang
- Stations: 25

Service
- Type: Rapid transit
- System: Changsha Metro
- Services: 1
- Operator(s): Changsha Metro Corporation

History
- Opened: 28 June 2016; 9 years ago

Technical
- Line length: 33.43 km (20.77 mi)
- Number of tracks: 2
- Character: Underground and Elevated
- Track gauge: 1,435 mm (4 ft 8 1/2 in)
- Electrification: Overhead catenary, 1,500 V DC

Line 1 of the Changsha Metro (Chinese: 长沙地铁1号线; pinyin: Chángshā Dìtiě Yī Hào Xiàn) is a line of the Changsha Metro that runs across Changsha, from Jinpenqiu in the north to Shangshuangtang in the south. It serves 25 stations over 33.43 km, and is coloured red on the system map. It first began operations on June 28, 2016.

== History ==
The first phase of the line, spanning 23.55 km (14.63 miles) from Kaifu District Government to Shangshuangtang, commenced construction work on December 26, 2010. Excavation work was completed in October 2015, and the section was opened on June 28, 2016.

A 5-station, 9.88 km long extension north to Jinpenqiu from Kaifu District Government began construction on October 16, 2020. It was completed on 28 June 2024.

=== Opening timeline ===
Segment	Commencement	Length	Station(s)	Name
Kaifu District Government — Shangshuangtang	28 June 2016	23.55 km (14.63 mi)	20	Phase 1
Jinpenqiu — Kaifu District Government	28 June 2024	9.88 km (6.14 mi)	5	Northern extension

== Stations ==
Station name		Connections	Distance km		Location
English	Chinese	Connections	Distance km		Location
Jinpenqiu	金盆丘		0.00	0.00	Kaifu
Jinxia	金霞				Kaifu
Eyangshan	鹅羊山				Kaifu
Xiufengshan	秀峰山				Kaifu
Sulongqiao	宿龙桥				Kaifu
Kaifu District Government	开福区政府				Kaifu
Machang	马厂		1.70	1.70	Kaifu
Beichen Delta	北辰三角洲		1.80	3.50	Kaifu
Kaifu Temple	开福寺	CZT	1.70	5.20	Kaifu
Wenchangge	文昌阁	6	1.00	6.20	Kaifu
Peiyuanqiao	培元桥		0.80	7.00	Kaifu
Wuyi Square	五一广场	2	1.30	8.30	Kaifu/Furong/Tianxin
Huangxing Square	黄兴广场		0.60	8.90	Kaifu/Furong/Tianxin
Nanmenkou	南门口		0.60	9.50	Tianxin
Houjiatang	侯家塘	3	1.35	10.85	Tianxin
Nanhu Road	南湖路		1.00	11.85	Tianxin/Yuhua
Huangtuling	黄土岭	4	0.70	12.55	Tianxin/Yuhua
Tujiachong	涂家冲		0.75	13.30	Tianxin/Yuhua
Railway Campus	铁道学院		1.95	15.25	Tianxin
Youyi Road	友谊路		1.00	16.25	Tianxin
Provincial Government	省政府		1.80	18.05	Tianxin
Guihuaping	桂花坪		1.30	19.35	Tianxin
Datuo	大托		1.85	21.20	Tianxin
Zhongxin Square	中信广场	5 CZT (Xianfeng)	1.00	22.20	Tianxin
Shangshuangtang	尚双塘		1.40	23.60	Tianxin

== Rolling stock ==
Services on the line are provided by a fleet of 23 Type B train sets manufactured by CRRC Zhuzhou. These train sets run in a six-car formation and have a top speed of 80 km/h (50 mi/h), and have double-layered flooring installed for noise reduction and improved passenger comfort.
