= Jinpenqiu station =

Subway station on the Changsha Metro in Changsha, Hunan, China

Jinpenqiu station 金盆丘站
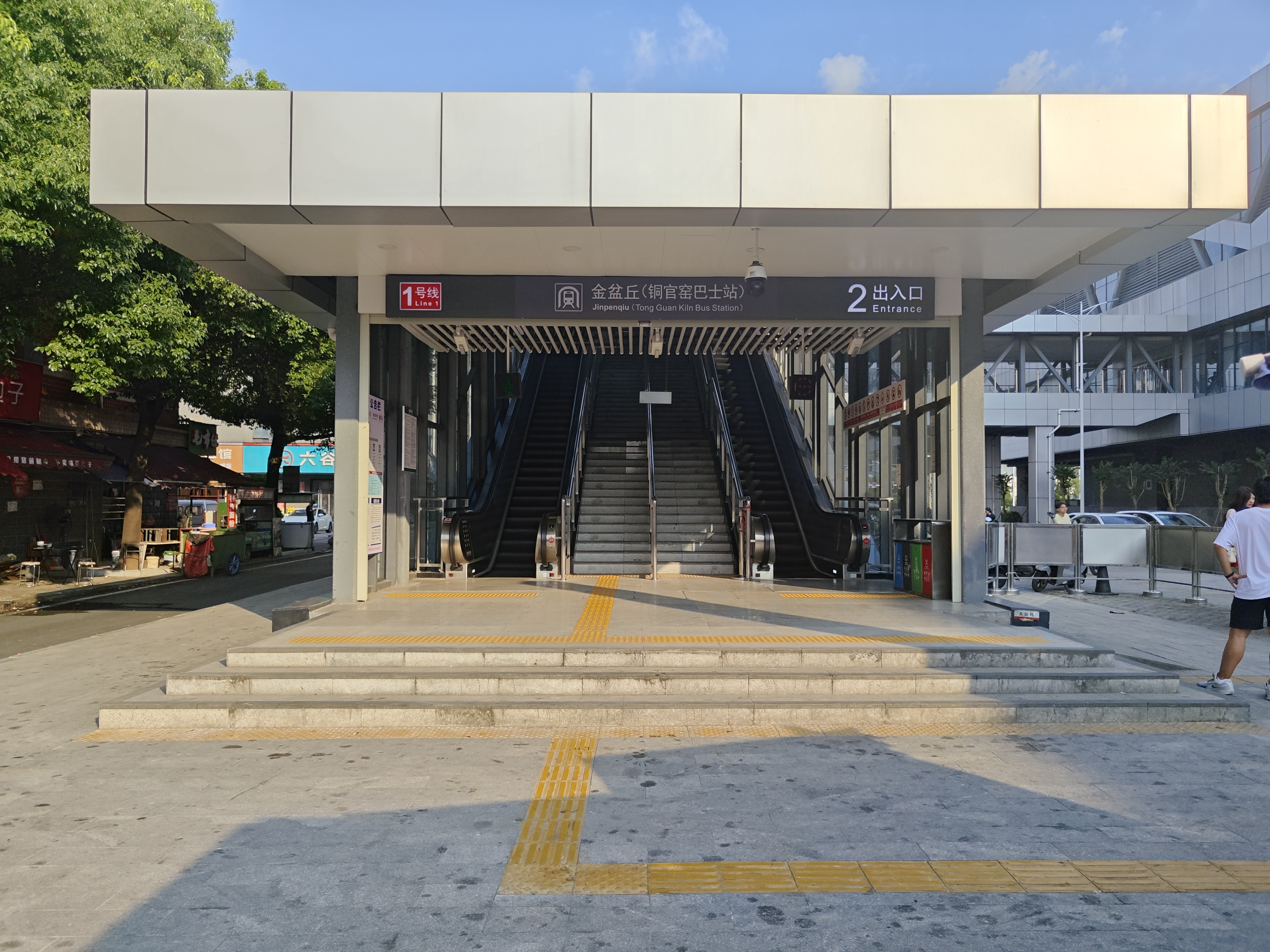
- Entrance 2

Chinese name
- Chinese: 金盆丘站
Transcriptions
Standard Mandarin
- Hanyu Pinyin: Jīnpénqiū Zhàn

General information
- Location: Kaifu District, Changsha, Hunan; China
- Coordinates: 28°20′33″N 112°55′40″E
- Operated by: Changsha Metro
- Line(s): Line 1
- Platforms: 2 (1 island platform)

History
- Opened: 28 June 2024; 14 months ago

Services
Preceding station	Changsha Metro	Following station
Terminus	Line 1	Jinxia towards Shangshuangtang
Location

Jinpenqiu station is a subway station in Kaifu District, Changsha, Hunan, China, operated by the Changsha subway operator Changsha Metro.

== History ==
The station was opened and entered revenue service on 28 June 2024.

== Surrounding area ==
- Jinpenqiu Residential Community
- Hunan Jinxia Grain Logistics Park (湖南金霞粮食物流园)
