= Shangshuangtang station =

Metro station in Changsha, China

Coordinates: 28.2035°N 112.9577°E

Shangshuangtang Station 尚双塘站
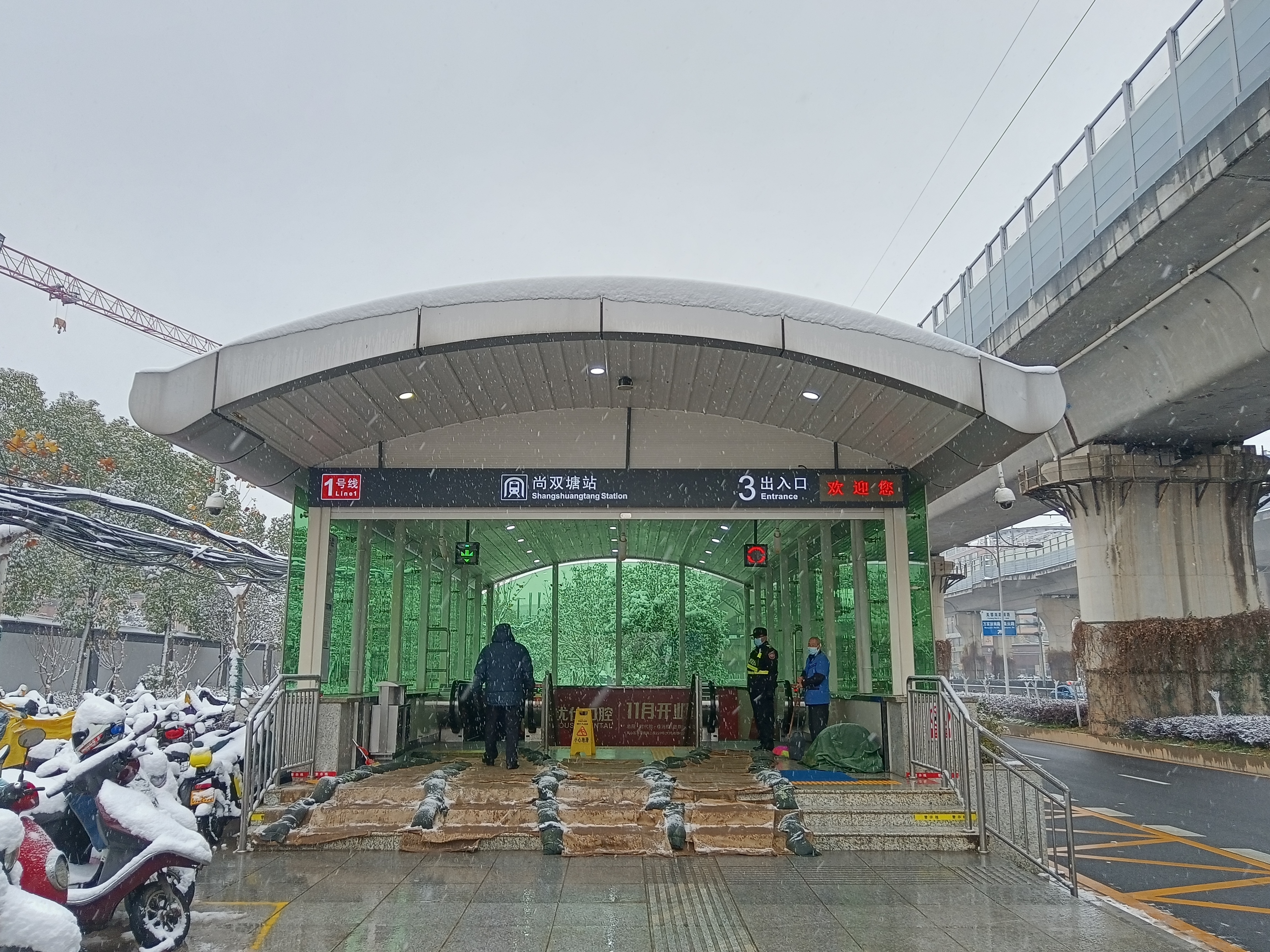
- Entrance No. 3 of Shangshuangtang station

General information
- Location: Yuhua District, Changsha, Hunan; China
- Operator: Changsha Metro Corporation
- Line: Line 1
- Platforms: 2 (2 side platforms)

Construction
- Structure type: Elevated

History
- Opened: 28 June 2016; 10 years ago

Services
Preceding station	Changsha Metro	Following station
Zhongxin Square towards Jinpenqiu	Line 1	Terminus
Location

Shangshuangtang station is a metro station in Yuhua District, Changsha, Hunan, China, operated by the Changsha subway operator Changsha Metro. It opened on 28 June 2016.

== Station Platform ==
Third Floor
Third Floor	Side platform, Doors will open on the right
Third Floor	←	Line 1 toward Jinpenqiu (Zhongxin Square Station)
Third Floor		Line 1 Terminus
Third Floor	Side platform, Doors will open on the right
Second Floor	Concourse	Hall, Ticket machine, Customer service, Passageway
Ground level	Entrance
