= East Martyrs Park station =

Metro station in Changsha, China

East Martyrs Park station 烈士公园东站
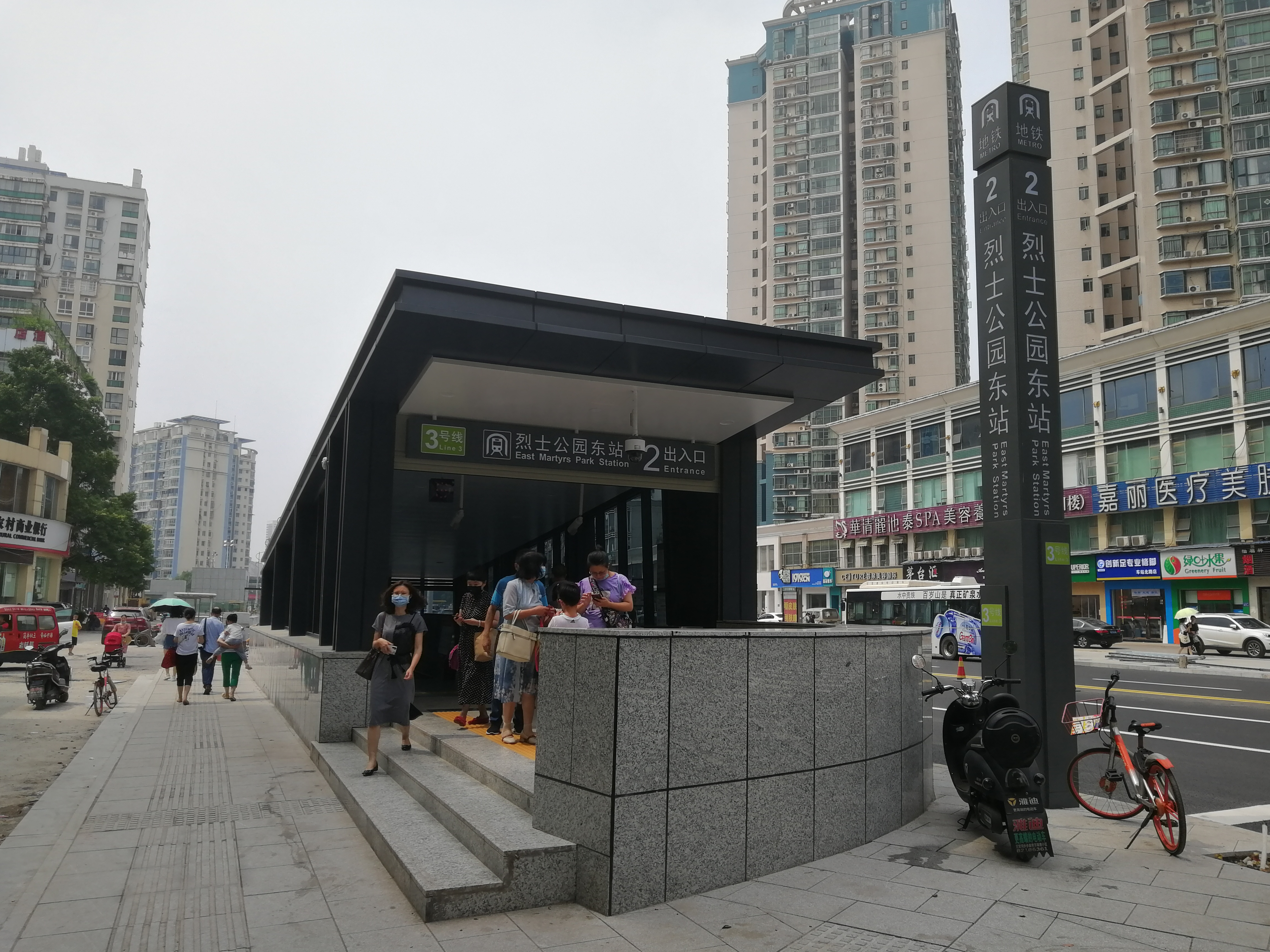

General information
- Location: Kaifu District, Changsha, Hunan; China
- Coordinates: 28°12′51″N 113°00′55″E
- Operated by: Changsha Metro
- Line(s): Line 3
- Platforms: 2 (1 island platform)

History
- Opened: 28 June 2020

Services
Preceding station	Changsha Metro	Following station
Railway Station towards Shantang	Line 3	Simaochong towards Guangsheng

East Martyrs Park station (Chinese: 烈士公园东站; pinyin: Lièshì Gōngyuán Dōng zhàn) is an underground railway station in Kaifu District, Changsha, Hunan, China, operated by Changsha Metro. It entered revenue service on 28 June 2020.

== History ==
The station started test operation on 30 December 2019. It opened for passengers on 28 June 2020.

== Surrounding area ==
- Hunan Martyr's Park
