= Houjiatang station =

Subway station in Tianxin District, Changsha, China

Houjiatang Station 侯家塘站
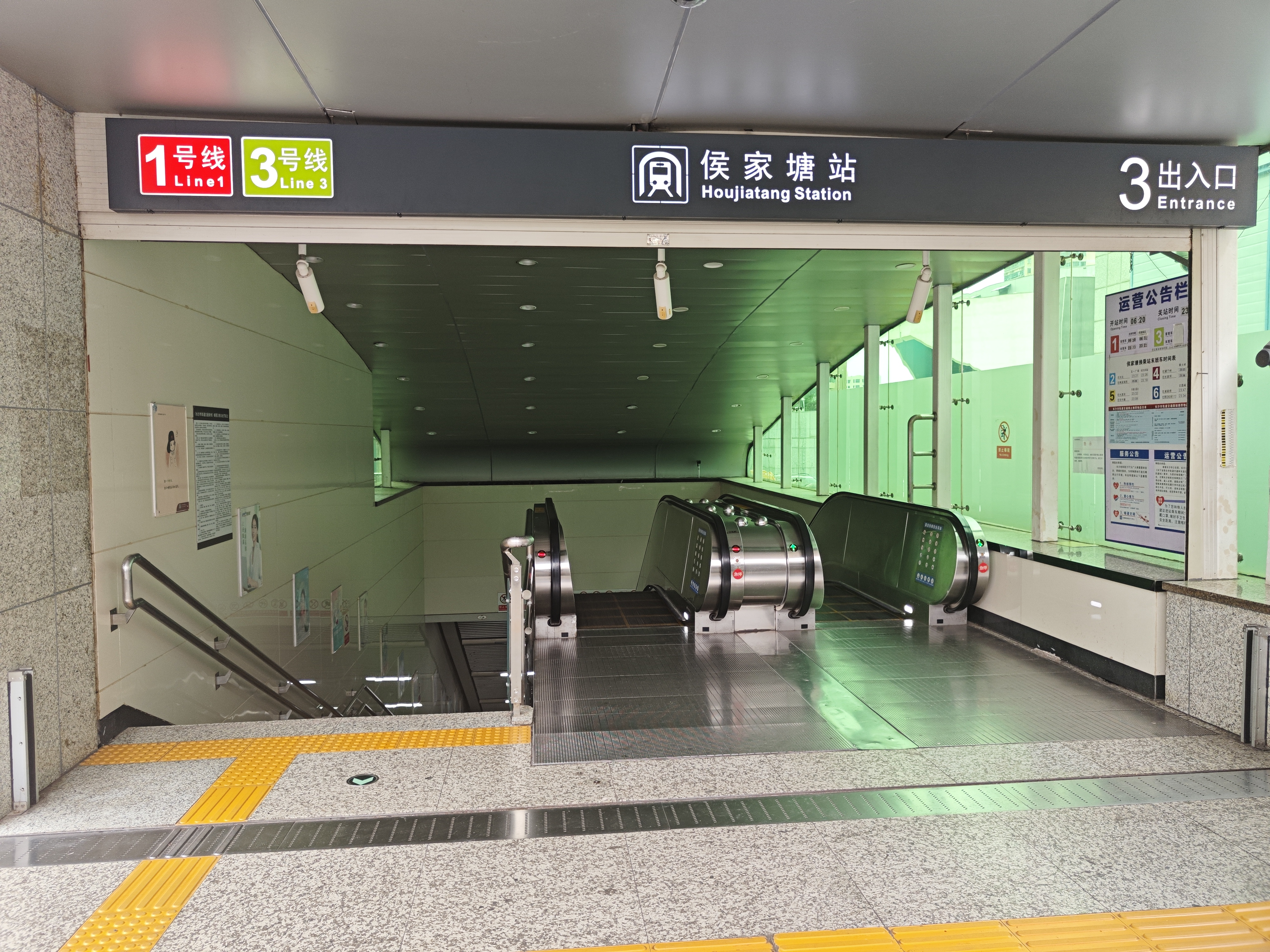
- Entrance 3

General information
- Location: Tianxin District, Changsha, Hunan; China
- Coordinates: 28°10′46″N 112°59′18″E
- Operated by: Changsha Metro
- Lines: Line 1 Line 3
- Platforms: 4 (2 island platforms)

History
- Opened: 28 June 2016; 9 years ago (Line 1); 28 June 2020; 5 years ago (Line 3)

Services
Preceding station	Changsha Metro	Following station
Nanmenkou towards Jinpenqiu	Line 1	Nanhu Road towards Shangshuangtang
Lingguandu towards Xiangtan North Railway Station	Line 3	Dongtang towards Guangsheng
Location

Houjiatang station is a subway station in Tianxin District, Changsha, Hunan, China, operated by the Changsha subway operator Changsha Metro. It entered revenue service on June 28, 2016.

== History ==
The station opened on 28 June 2016.

== Layout ==
G		Exits
LG1	Concourse	Faregates, Station Agent
LG2	←	Line 1 towards Jinpenqiu (Nanmenkou)
LG2	Island platform, doors open on the left
LG2		Line 1 towards Shangshuangtang (Nanhu Road)	→
LG3	←	Line 3 towards Hongqiao (Lingguandu)
LG3	Island platform, doors open on the left
LG3		Line 3 towards Guangsheng (Dongtang)	→

== Surrounding area ==
- He Long Stadium
- Baisha Well
- Changsha No. 15 School
- Entrance No.3: Tian Han Grand Theatre
