= Xingsha station =

Station in Changsha Metro, Hunan, China

Xingsha station 星沙站
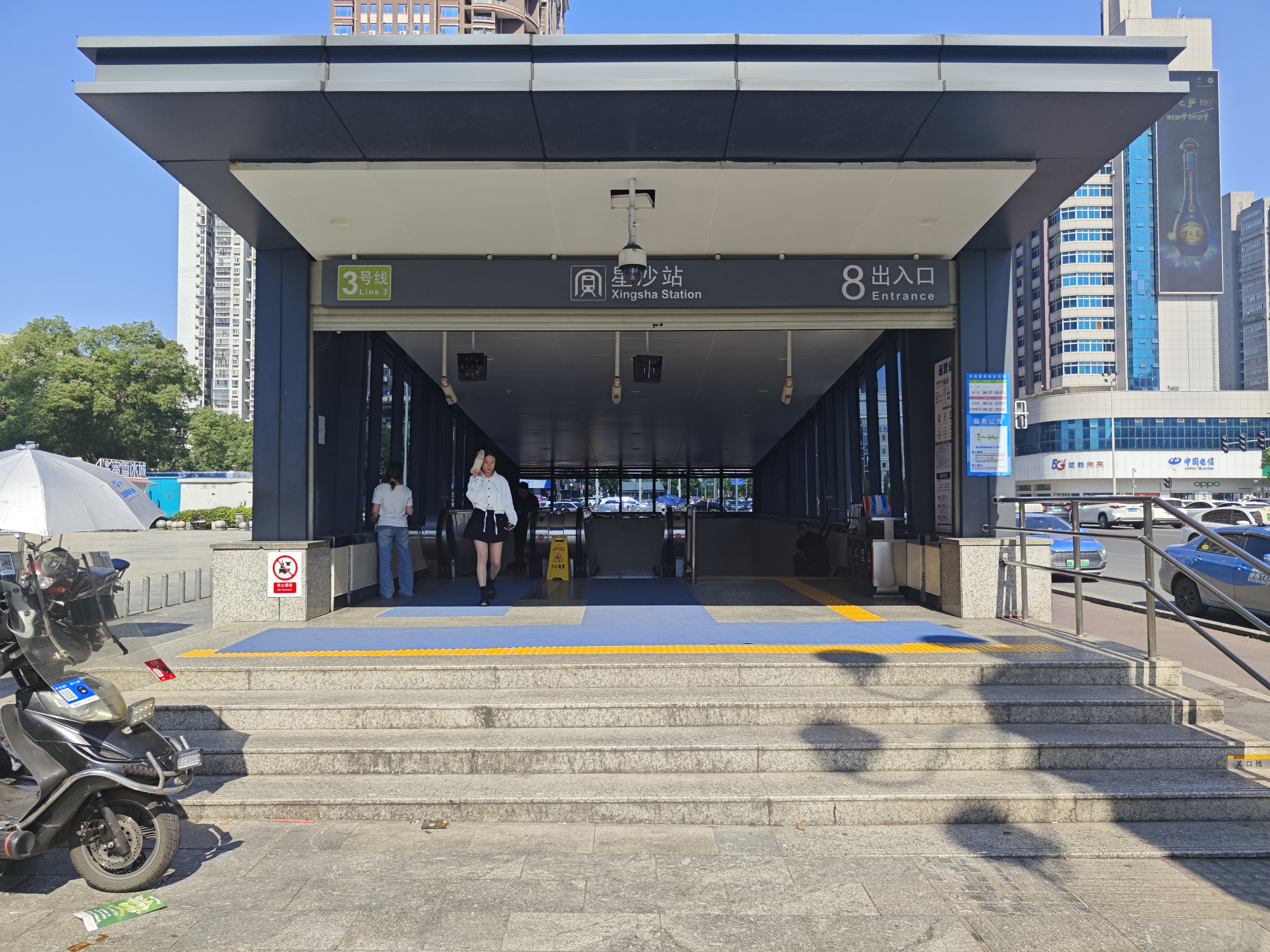
- Entrance 8

General information
- Location: Changsha County, Hunan; China
- Coordinates: 28°15′05″N 113°05′27″E
- Operated by: Changsha Metro
- Line: Line 3
- Platforms: 2 (1 island platform)

History
- Opened: 28 June 2020

Services
Preceding station	Changsha Metro	Following station
Xianglong towards Xiangtan North Railway Station	Line 3	Songya Lake (South) towards Guangsheng
Location

Xingsha station (Chinese: 星沙站; pinyin: Xīngshā Zhàn) is a subway station in Changsha County, Hunan, China, operated by the Changsha subway operator Changsha Metro. It entered revenue service on 28 June 2020.

== History ==
The station started the test operation on 30 December 2019. The station opened on 28 June 2020.

== Surrounding area ==
- Changsha County Government
- Xingsha High School
- Sany Heavy Industry
