= Sifangping station =

Subway station in Changsha, Hunan, China

Sifangping station 四方坪站
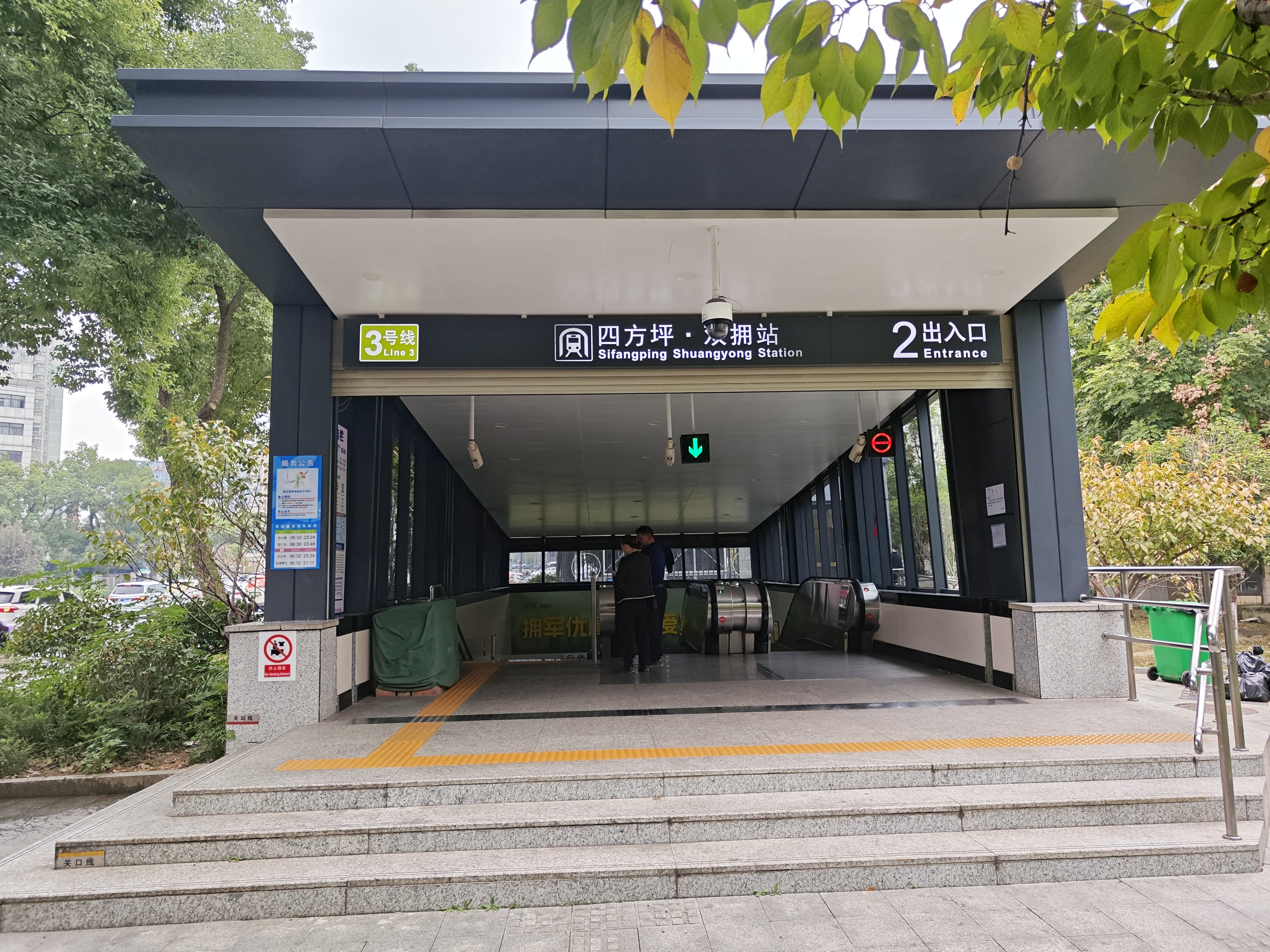
- Entrance 2

General information
- Location: Kaifu District, Changsha, Hunan; China
- Coordinates: 28°14′11″N 113°00′48″E
- Operated by: Changsha Metro
- Line(s): Line 3
- Platforms: 2 (1 island platform)

History
- Opened: 28 June 2020

Services
Preceding station	Changsha Metro	Following station
Simaochong towards Shantang	Line 3	Yaquehu towards Guangsheng

Sifangping station (Chinese: 四方坪站; pinyin: Sìfāngpíng Zhàn) is a subway station in Kaifu District, Changsha, Hunan, China, operated by the Changsha subway operator Changsha Metro. It entered revenue service on 28 June 2020.

== History ==
The station started the test operation on 30 December 2019. The station opened on 28 June 2020.

== Surrounding area ==
- National University of Defense Technology
