= Songya Lake (South) station =

Metro station in Changsha, China

Songya Lake (South) station 松雅湖（南）站
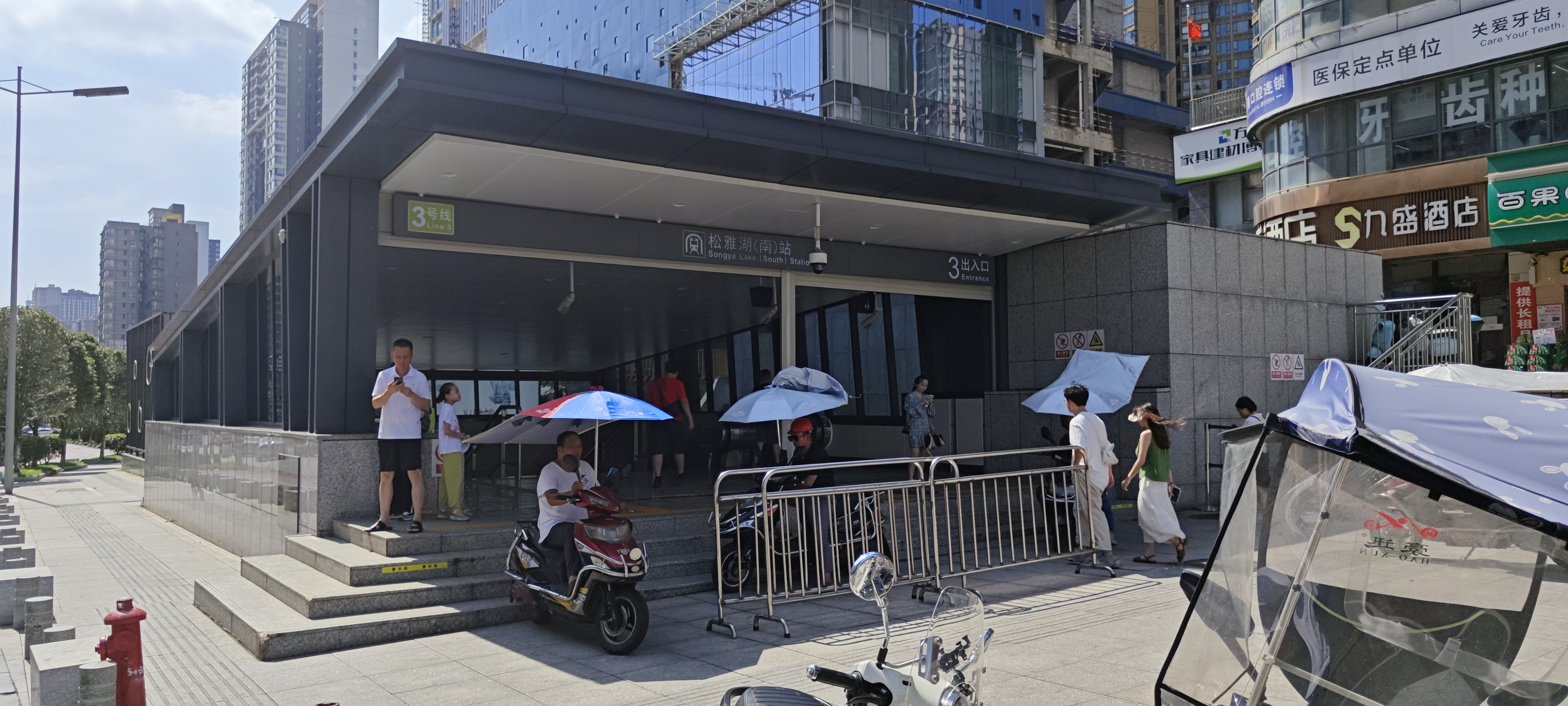
- Entrance 3

General information
- Location: Changsha County, Hunan; China
- Coordinates: 28°15′04″N 113°06′38″E
- Operated by: Changsha Metro
- Line(s): Line 3
- Platforms: 2 (1 island platform)

History
- Opened: 28 June 2020

Services
Preceding station	Changsha Metro	Following station
Xingsha towards Shantang	Line 3	Xingsha Culture and Sports Center towards Guangsheng

Songya Lake (South) station (Chinese: 松雅湖（南）站; pinyin: Sōngyǎhú Nán zhàn) is a subway station in Changsha County, Hunan, China, operated by the Changsha subway operator Changsha Metro. It entered revenue service on 28 June 2020.

== History ==
The station started the test operation on 30 December 2019. The station opened on 28 June 2020.

== Surrounding area ==
- Hunan Mass Media Vocational Technical College
- Changsha Normal University
- Songya Lake Wetland Park
