= Huangjiawan station =

Subway station in Hunan, China

Huangjiawan station 黄家湾站
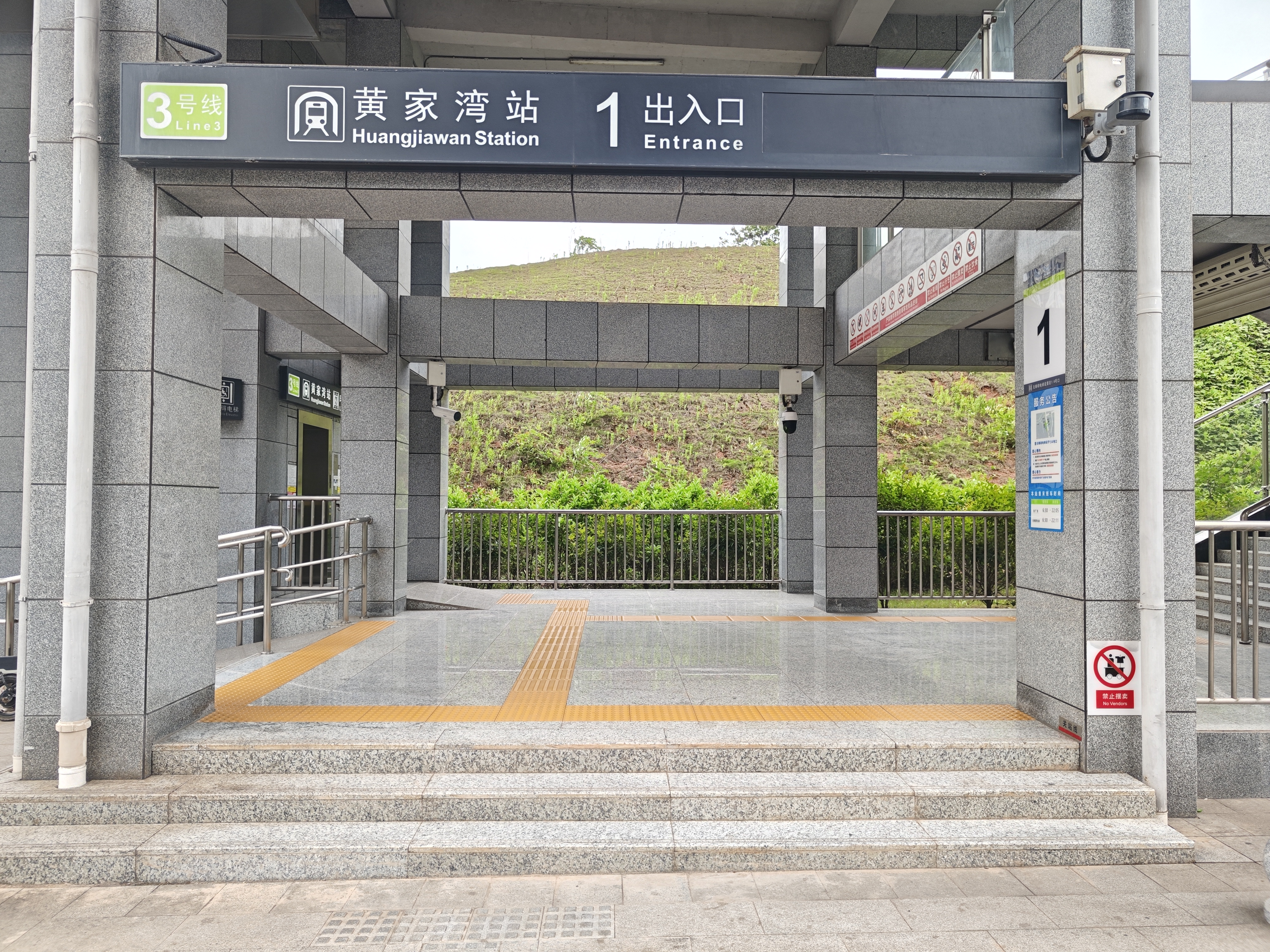
- Entrance 1

Chinese name
- Simplified Chinese: 黄家湾站
- Traditional Chinese: 黃家湾站
Transcriptions
Standard Mandarin
- Hanyu Pinyin: Huángjiāwān Zhàn

General information
- Location: Yuhu District of Xiangtan, Hunan; China
- Coordinates: 27°59′37.31″N 112°56′30″E
- Operated by: Changsha Metro
- Line(s): Line 3
- Platforms: 2 (1 island platform)

History
- Opened: 28 June 2023; 2 years ago

Services
Preceding station	Changsha Metro	Following station
Chuanxingshan towards Shantang	Line 3	Shuanghu towards Guangsheng
Location

Huangjiawan station is a subway station in Yuhu District of Xiangtan, Hunan, China, operated by the Changsha subway operator Changsha Metro. It entered revenue service on 28 June 2023.

== History ==
The station opened on 28 June 2023.

== Surrounding area ==
- Xiangtan Institute of Technology
- Baiquan Forest Park (白泉森林公园)
