= Central South University station =

Metro station in Changsha, China

Central South University station 中南大学站
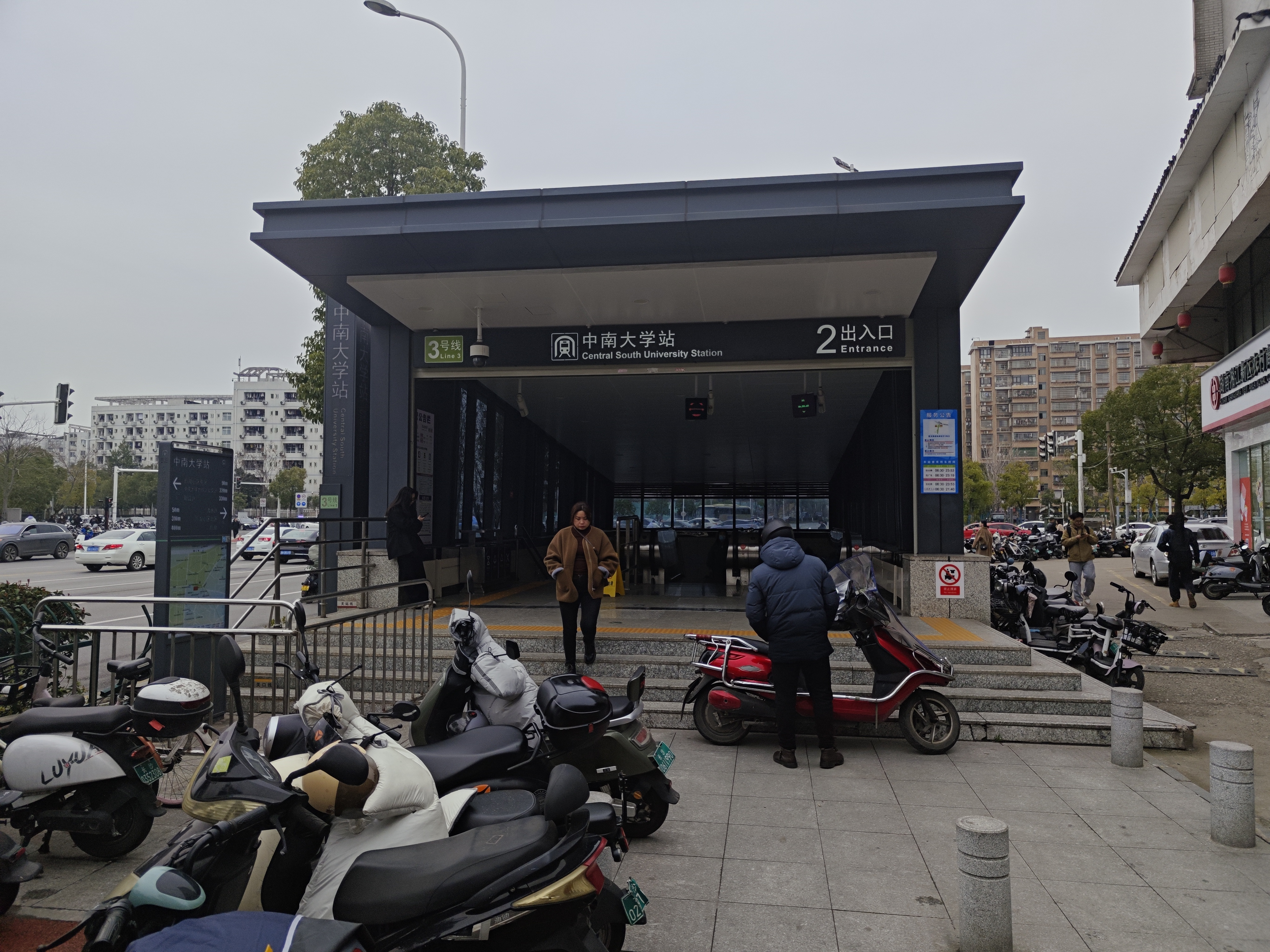
- Entrance 2

General information
- Location: Yuelu District, Changsha, Hunan; China
- Coordinates: 28°09′35″N 112°56′38″E
- Operated by: Changsha Metro
- Line: Line 3
- Platforms: 2 (1 island platform)

History
- Opened: 28 June 2020; 5 years ago

Services
Preceding station	Changsha Metro	Following station
Yangguang towards Xiangtan North Railway Station	Line 3	Fubuhe towards Guangsheng
Location

Central South University station (Chinese: 中南大学站; pinyin: Zhōngnán Dàxué Zhàn) is a subway station in Yuelu District, Changsha, Hunan, China, operated by the Changsha subway operator Changsha Metro. It entered revenue service on 28 June 2020.

== History ==
The station started the test operation on 30 December 2019. The station opened on 28 June 2020.

== Surrounding area ==
- Central South University Stadium
- Student apartment of Central South University
- Houhu Neighbourhood
