= Tongxi station =

Subway station in Hunan, China

Tongxi station 桐溪站
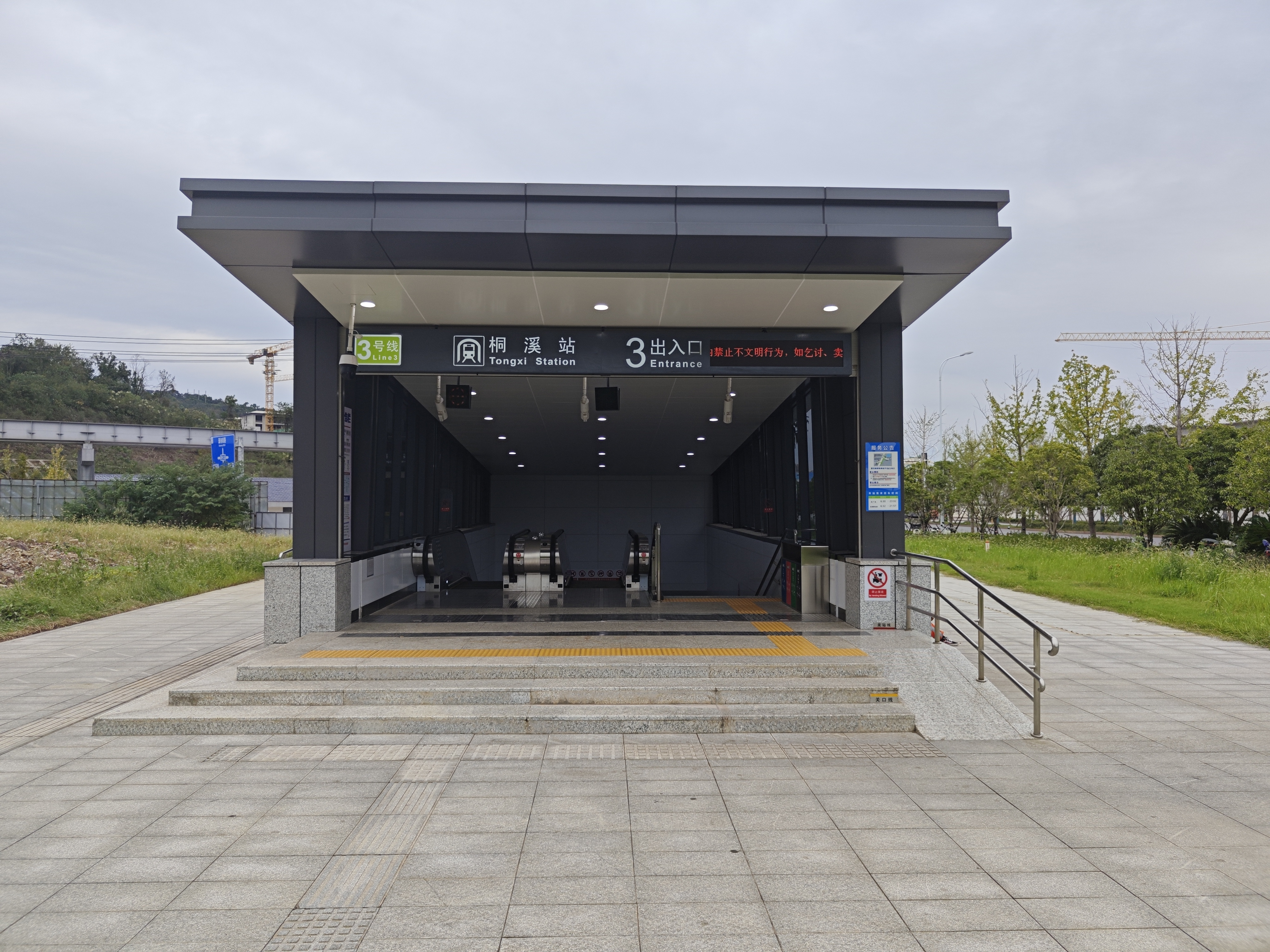
- Entrance 3

Chinese name
- Chinese: 桐溪站
Transcriptions
Standard Mandarin
- Hanyu Pinyin: Tóngxī Zhàn

General information
- Location: Yuelu District of Changsha, Hunan; China
- Coordinates: 28°02′49″N 112°54′27″E
- Operated by: Changsha Metro
- Line(s): Line 3
- Platforms: 2 (1 island platform)

History
- Opened: 28 June 2023; 2 years ago

Services
| Preceding station | Changsha Metro | Following station |
|---|---|---|
| Hongqiao towards Shantang | Line 3 | Dawangshan towards Guangsheng |
Location

Tongxi station is a subway station in Yuelu District of Changsha, Hunan, China, operated by the Changsha subway operator Changsha Metro. It entered revenue service on 28 June 2023.

== History ==
The station opened on 28 June 2023.

== Surrounding area ==
- Tongxi Temple
- Tomb of Zeng Guofan
- Dawang Mountain Tourist Resort (大王山旅游度假区)
- Shifeng Mountain Forest Park (狮峰山森林公园)
- Huayi Brothers Movie Town (华谊兄弟电影小镇)
