= Xingsha Culture and Sports Center station =

Metro station in Changsha, China

Xingsha Culture and Sports Center station 星沙文体中心站
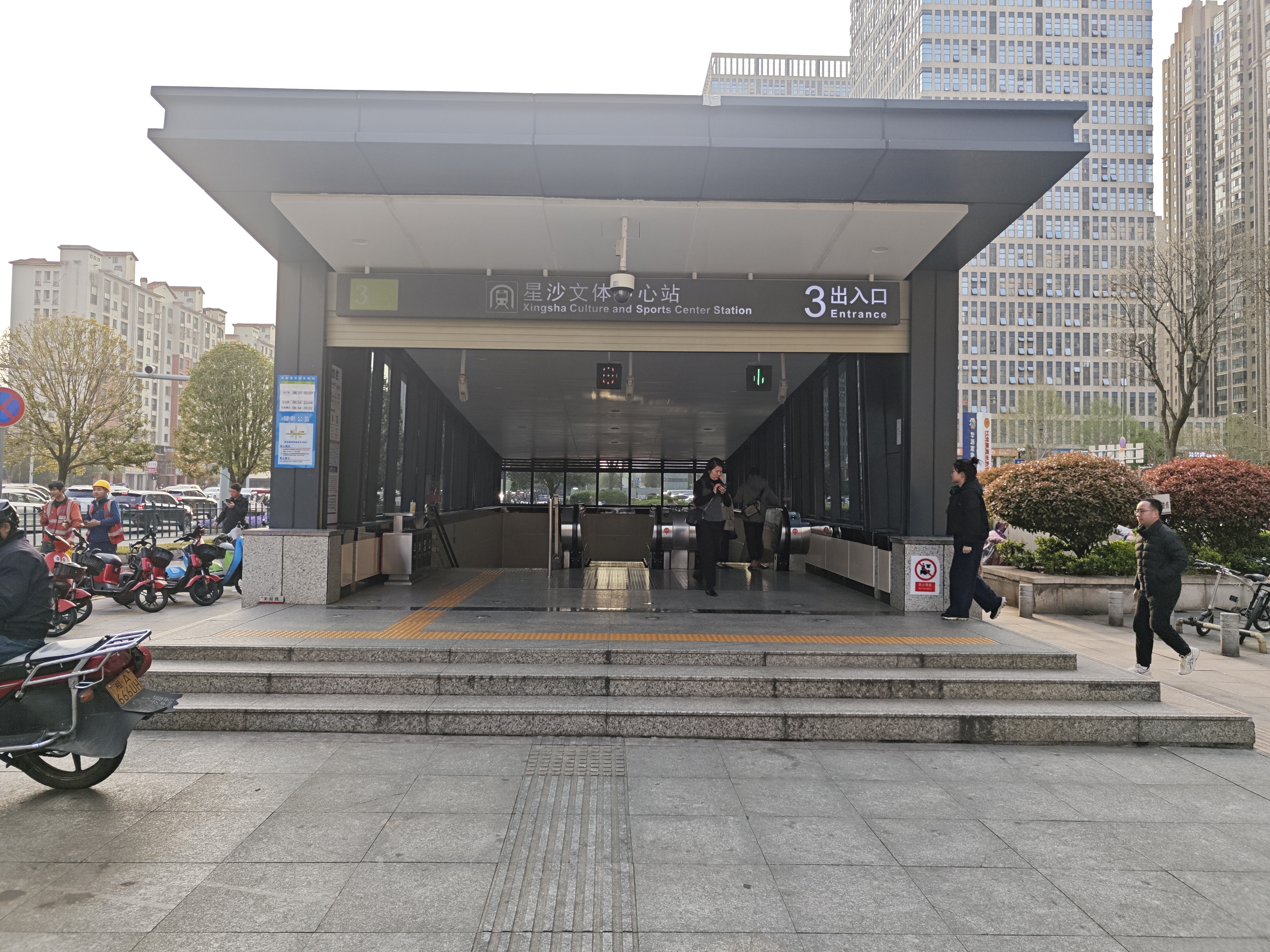
- Entrance 3

General information
- Location: Changsha County, Hunan; China
- Coordinates: 28°15′04″N 113°07′05″E
- Operated by: Changsha Metro
- Line: Line 3
- Platforms: 2 (1 island platform)

History
- Opened: 28 June 2020

Services
Preceding station	Changsha Metro	Following station
Songya Lake (South) towards Xiangtan North Railway Station	Line 3	Luositang towards Guangsheng
Location

Xingsha Culture and Sports Center station (Chinese: 星沙文体中心站; pinyin: Xīngshā Wéntǐ Zhōngxīn Zhàn) is a subway station in Changsha County, Hunan, China, operated by the Changsha subway operator Changsha Metro. It entered revenue service on 28 June 2020.

== History ==
The station started the test operation on 30 December 2019. The station opened on 28 June 2020.

== Surrounding area ==
- Changsha County Library
- Changsha County People's Court
