= Simaochong station =

Metro station in Changsha, China

Sifangchong station 丝茅冲站
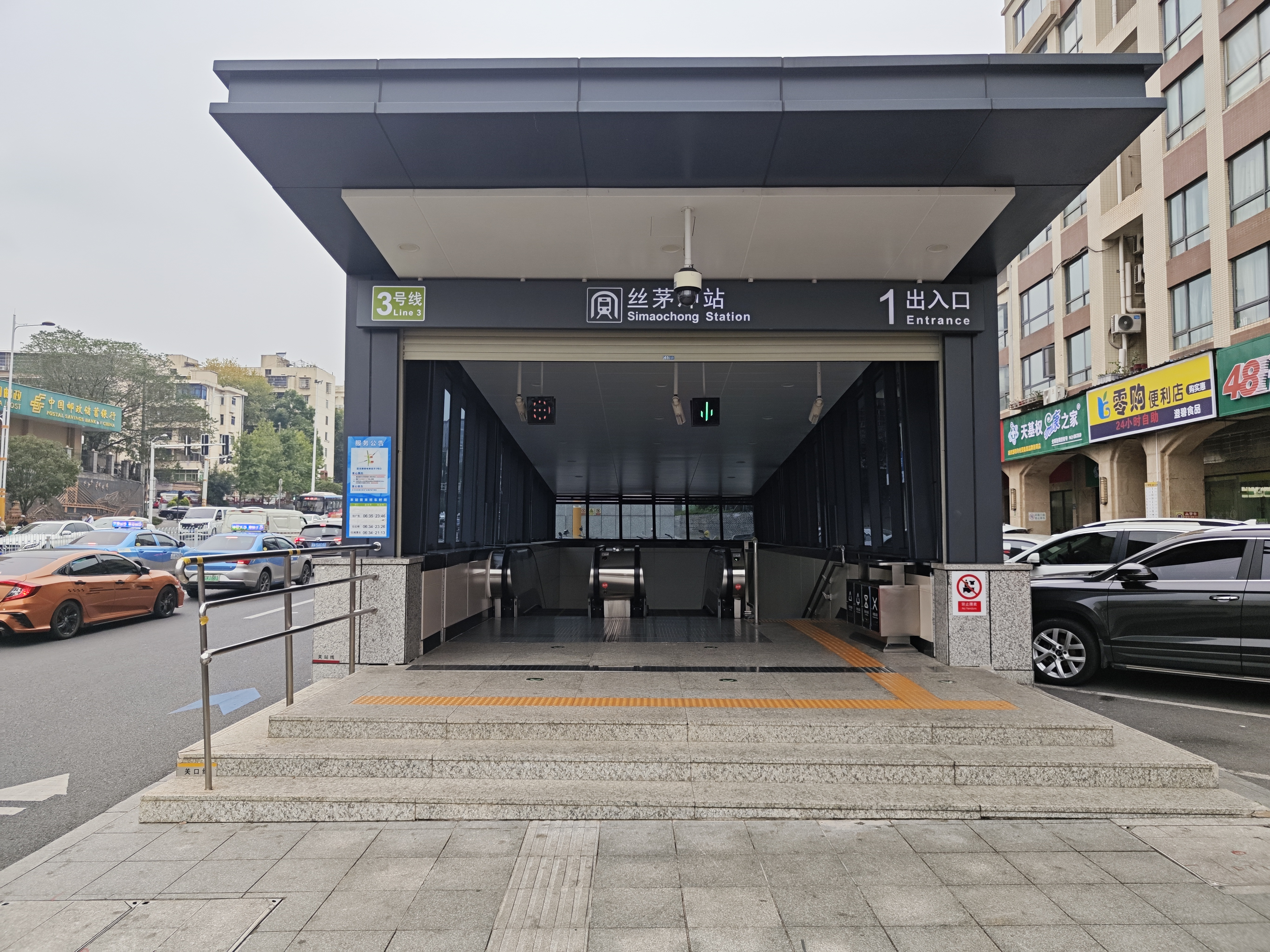
- Entrance 1

General information
- Location: Kaifu District, Changsha, Hunan; China
- Coordinates: 28°13′37″N 113°00′31″E
- Operated by: Changsha Metro
- Line(s): Line 3
- Platforms: 2 (1 island platform)

History
- Opened: 28 June 2020

Services
Preceding station	Changsha Metro	Following station
East Martyrs Park towards Shantang	Line 3	Sifangping towards Guangsheng

Sifangchong station (Chinese: 丝茅冲站; pinyin: Sīmáochōng Zhàn) is a subway station in Kaifu District, Changsha, Hunan, China, operated by the Changsha subway operator Changsha Metro. It entered revenue service on 28 June 2020.

== History ==
The station started the test operation on 30 December 2019. The station opened on 28 June 2020.

== Surrounding area ==
- National University of Defence Technology Hospital
- Hunan Academy of Social Sciences
- Hunan TV station
- Guangya Middle School of Changsha No.1 High School
