= Shuanghu station =

Subway station in Hunan, China

Shuanghu station 双湖站
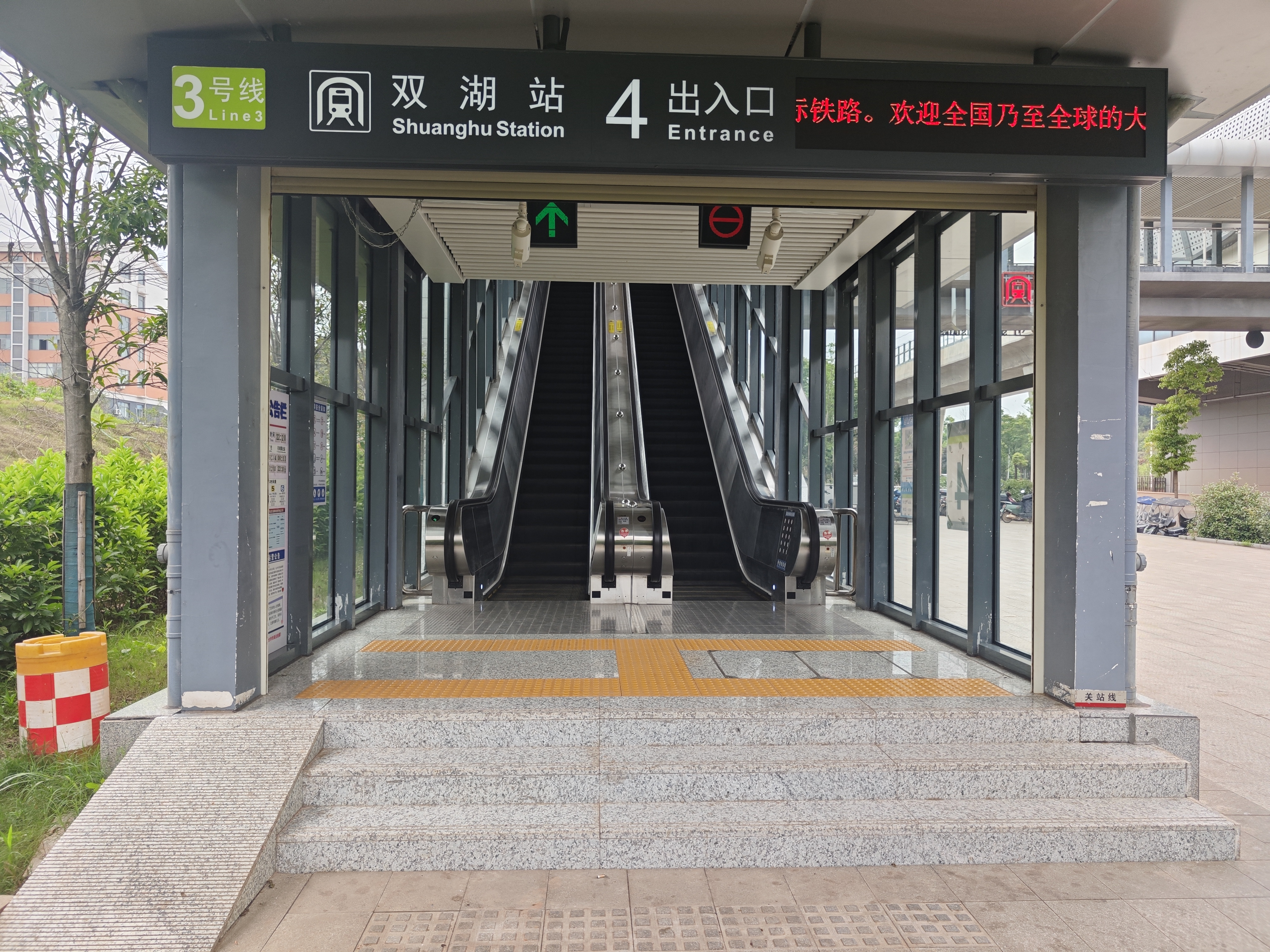
- Entrance 4

Chinese name
- Simplified Chinese: 双湖站
- Traditional Chinese: 雙湖站
Transcriptions
Standard Mandarin
- Hanyu Pinyin: Shuānghú Zhàn

General information
- Location: Yuelu District of Changsha, Hunan; China
- Coordinates: 28°01′47″N 112°55′21″E
- Operated by: Changsha Metro
- Line(s): Line 3
- Platforms: 2 (1 island platform)

History
- Opened: 28 June 2023; 2 years ago

Services
Preceding station	Changsha Metro	Following station
Huangjiawan towards Shantang	Line 3	Pingtang towards Guangsheng
Location

Shuanghu station is a subway station in Yuelu District of Changsha, Hunan, China, operated by the Changsha subway operator Changsha Metro. It entered revenue service on 28 June 2023.

== History ==
The station opened on 28 June 2023.

== Surrounding area ==
- Shuanghu Primary School
