= Pingtang station =

Subway station in Hunan, China

Pingtang station 坪塘站
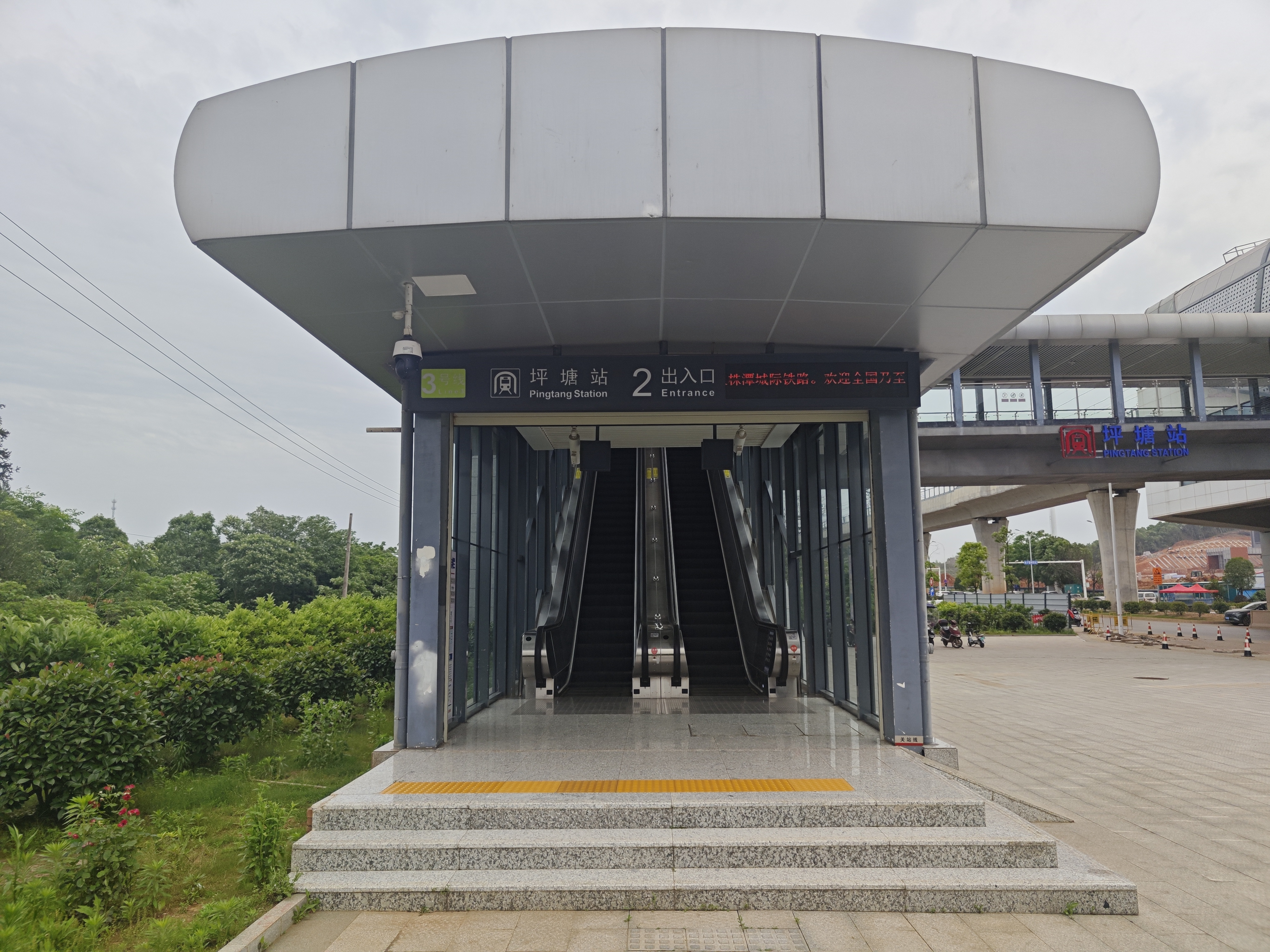
- Entrance 2

Chinese name
- Chinese: 坪塘站
Transcriptions
Standard Mandarin
- Hanyu Pinyin: Píngtáng Zhàn

General information
- Location: Yuelu District of Changsha, Hunan; China
- Coordinates: 28°02′49″N 112°54′27″E
- Operated by: Changsha Metro
- Line: Line 3
- Platforms: 2 (1 island platform)

History
- Opened: 28 June 2023; 2 years ago

Services
Preceding station	Changsha Metro	Following station
Shuanghu towards Xiangtan North Railway Station	Line 3	Hongqiao towards Guangsheng
Location

Pingtang station is a subway station in Yuelu District of Changsha, Hunan, China, operated by the Changsha subway operator Changsha Metro. It entered revenue service on 28 June 2023.

== History ==
The station opened on 28 June 2023. The opening of Pingtang station was part of the extension of Line 3 of the Changsha Metro, which connected additional stations on the Changsha–Xiangtan intercity route beginning service on the same day.

== Surrounding area ==
- Science City Campus of Changsha No.1 High School
