= Dawangshan station =

Subway station in Hunan, China

Dawangshan station 大王山站
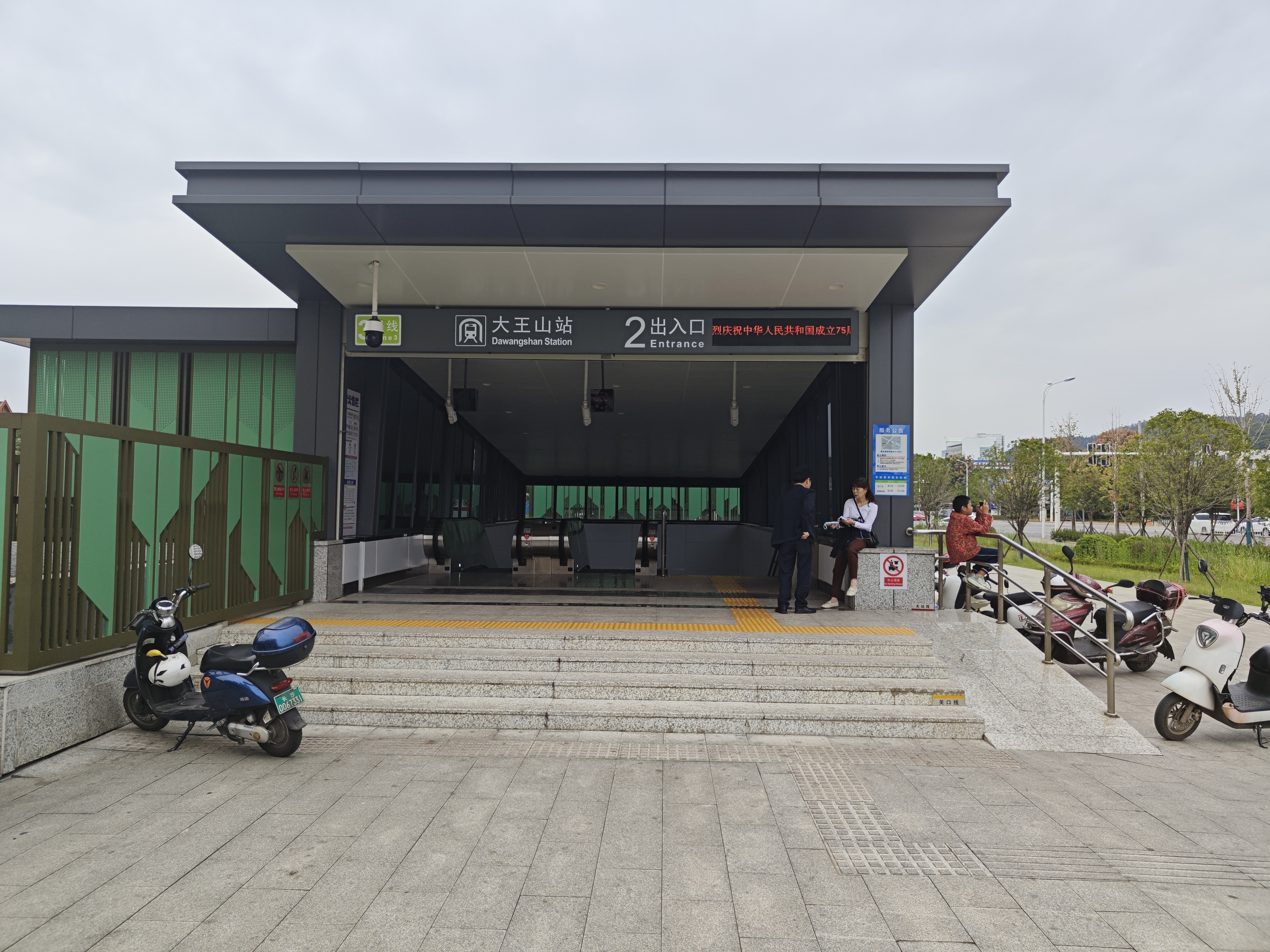
- Entrance 2

Chinese name
- Chinese: 大王山站
Transcriptions
Standard Mandarin
- Hanyu Pinyin: Dàwángshān Zhàn

General information
- Location: Yuelu District of Changsha, Hunan; China
- Coordinates: 28°05′32″N 112°54′42″E
- Operated by: Changsha Metro
- Line: Line 3
- Platforms: 2 (1 island platform)

History
- Opened: 28 June 2023; 2 years ago

Services
Preceding station	Changsha Metro	Following station
Tongxi towards Xiangtan North Railway Station	Line 3	Shantang towards Guangsheng
Location

Dawangshan station is a subway station in Yuelu District of Changsha, Hunan, China, operated by the Changsha subway operator Changsha Metro. It entered revenue service on 28 June 2023.

== History ==
The station opened on 28 June 2023.

== Surrounding area ==
- Dawang Mountain Tourist Resort (大王山旅游度假区)
- Tanzhou Experimental Primary School (潭州实验小学)
