= North Yuehu Park station =

Metro station in Changsha, China

North Yuehu Park station 月湖公园北站
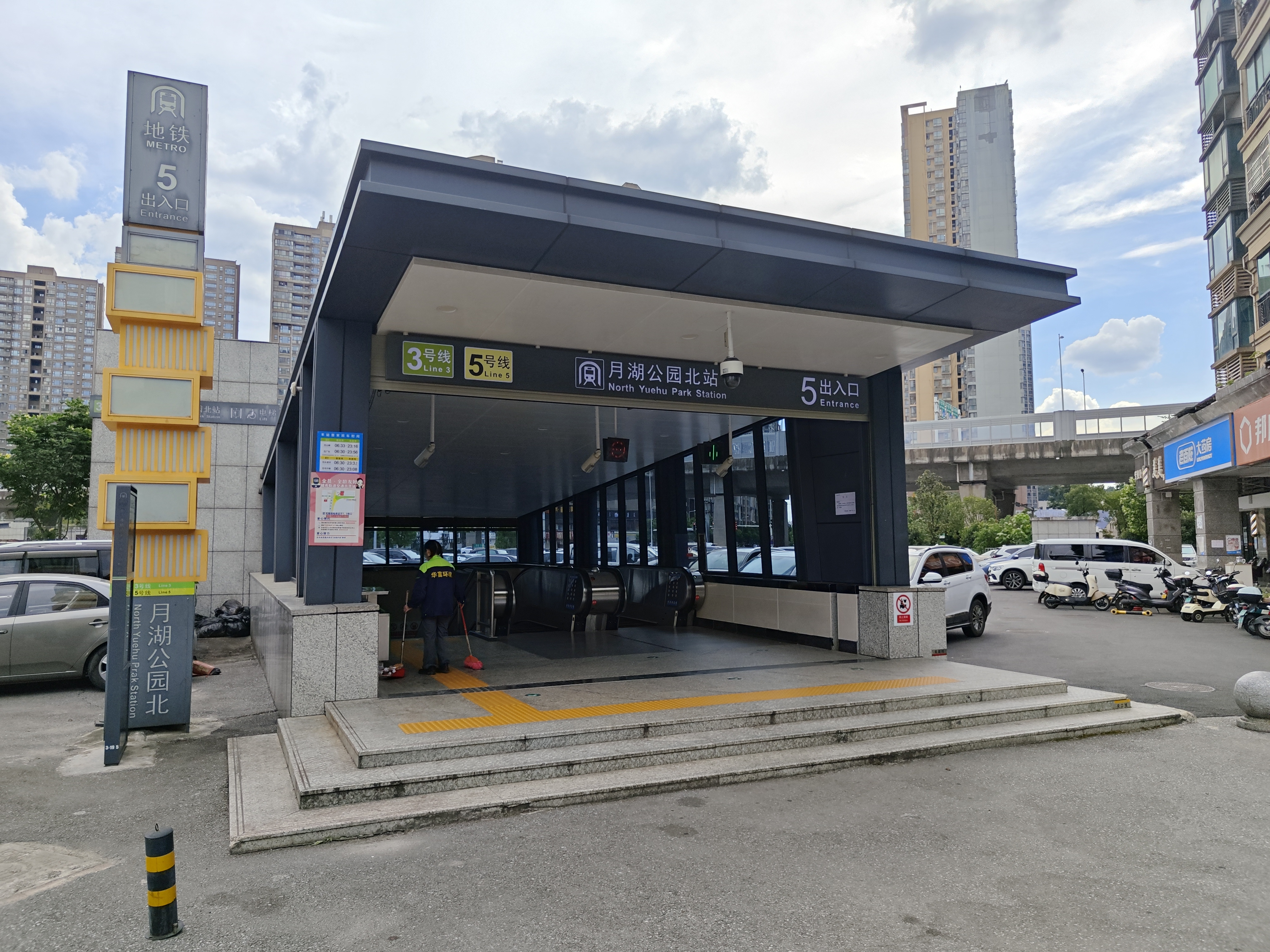
- Entrance 5

General information
- Location: Kaifu District, Changsha, Hunan; China
- Coordinates: 28°14′54″N 113°02′50″E
- Operated by: Changsha Metro
- Line(s): Line 3 Line 5
- Platforms: 4 (2 island platforms)

History
- Opened: 28 June 2020

Services
Preceding station	Changsha Metro	Following station
Changsha University towards Shantang	Line 3	Xianglong towards Guangsheng
Malanshan towards Maozhutang	Line 5	Baimaopu towards Shuiduhe

North Yuehu Park station (Chinese: 月湖公园北站; pinyin: Yuèhú Gōngyuán Běizhàn) is a subway station in Kaifu District, Changsha, Hunan, China, operated by the Changsha subway operator Changsha Metro. It entered revenue service on 28 June 2020.

== History ==
The station started the test operation on 30 December 2019. The station opened on 28 June 2020.

== Surrounding area ==
- Moon Lake Park
