= Hongqiao station =

Hongqiao station may refer to the following:

== Shanghai ==
- Shanghai Hongqiao railway station, in the Minhang District of Shanghai
  - Hongqiao Railway Station metro station, a station of the Shanghai Metro
- Hongqiao Airport Terminal 1 station, a metro station which serves Shanghai Hongqiao International Airport
- Hongqiao Airport Terminal 2 station, a metro station which serves Shanghai Hongqiao International Airport
- Hongqiao Road station, a metro station in Changning District, Shanghai

== Changsha ==
- Hongqiao station (Changsha Metro), station on the southern extension of Line 3 (Changsha Metro), in Yuelu District, Changsha, Hunan province

== Kunming ==
- Hongqiao station (Kunming Metro), station on Line 3 (Kunming Metro), in Panlong District, Kunming, Yunnan province
