= Xianglong station =

Metro station in Changsha, China

Xianglong station 湘龙站
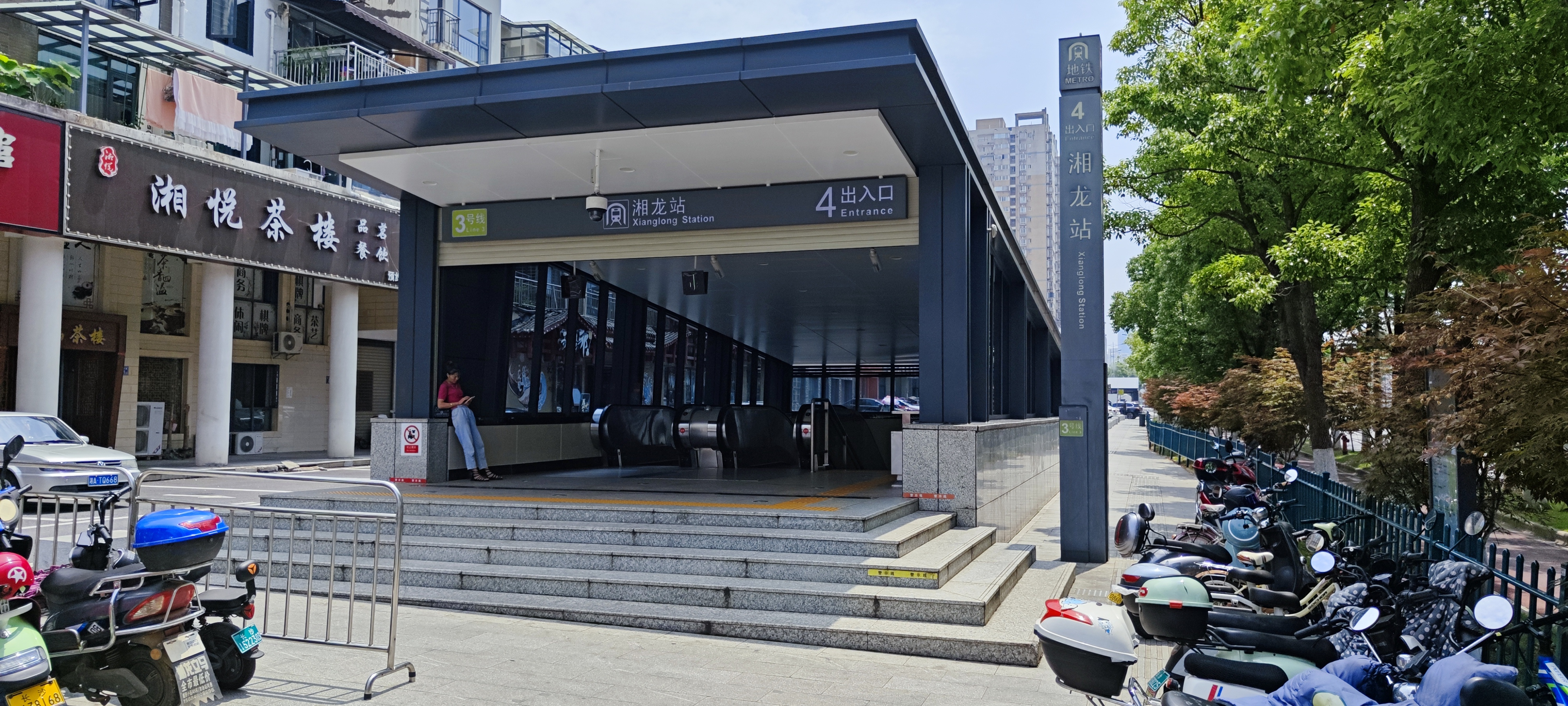
- Entrance 4

General information
- Location: Changsha County, Hunan; China
- Coordinates: 28°15′06″N 113°04′04″E
- Operated by: Changsha Metro
- Line: Line 3
- Platforms: 2 (1 island platform)

History
- Opened: 28 June 2020

Services
Preceding station	Changsha Metro	Following station
North Yuehu Park towards Xiangtan North Railway Station	Line 3	Xingsha towards Guangsheng
Location

Xianglong station (Chinese: 湘龙站; pinyin: Xiānglóng Zhàn) is a subway station in Changsha County, Hunan, China, operated by the Changsha subway operator Changsha Metro. It entered revenue service on 28 June 2020.

== History ==
The station started the test operation on 30 December 2019. The station opened on 28 June 2020.

== Surrounding area ==
- South Central Auto World
- Window of the World (Changsha)
- Changsha Underwater World
