= Yangguang station =

Metro station in Changsha, China

Yangguang station 阳光站
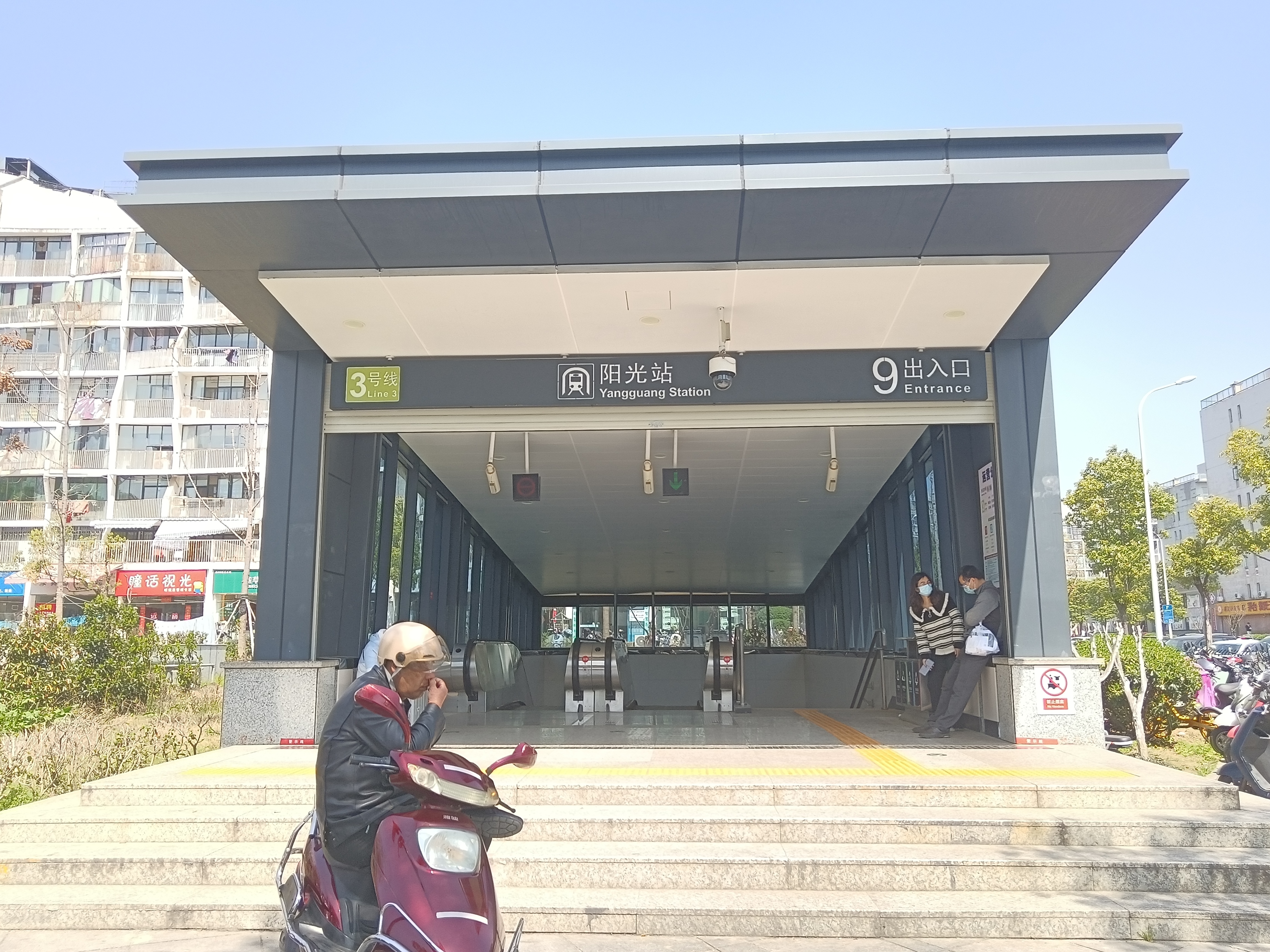

General information
- Location: Yuelu District, Changsha, Hunan; China
- Coordinates: 28°08′50″N 112°56′36″E
- Operated by: Changsha Metro
- Line(s): Line 3
- Platforms: 2 (1 island platform)

History
- Opened: 28 June 2020; 5 years ago

Services
| Preceding station | Changsha Metro | Following station |
|---|---|---|
| Yanghu ECO. Town towards Xiangtan North Railway Station | Line 3 | Central South University towards Guangsheng |
Location

Yangguang station (Chinese: 阳光站; pinyin: Yángguāng Zhàn) is a subway station in Yuelu District, Changsha, Hunan, China, operated by the Changsha subway operator Changsha Metro. It entered revenue service on 28 June 2020.

== History ==
The station started the test operation on 30 December 2019. The station opened on 28 June 2020.

== Surrounding area ==
- Sunshine 100 International New Town
