= Lingguandu station =

Metro station in Changsha, China

Lingguandu station 灵官渡站
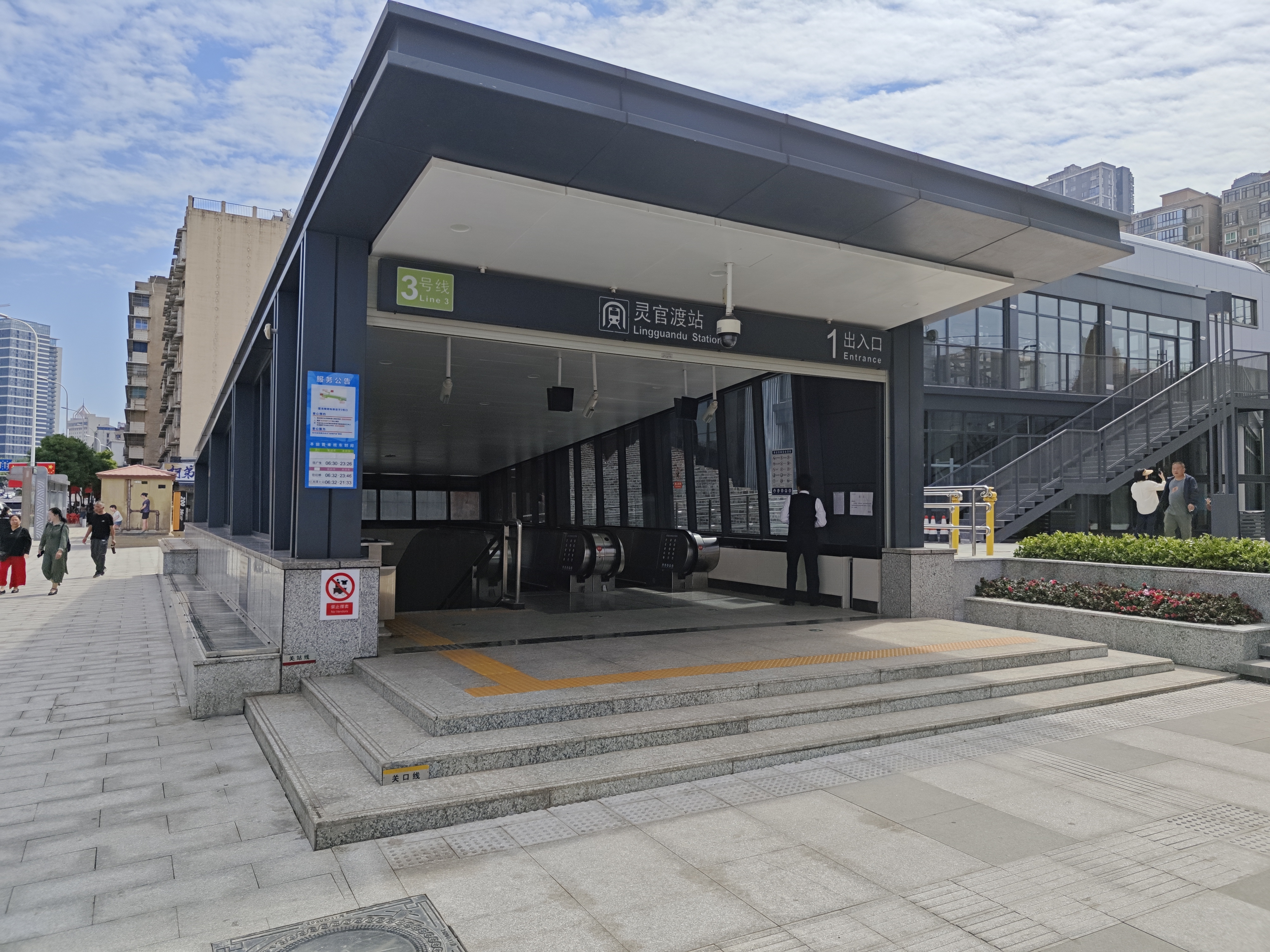
- Entrance 1

General information
- Location: Tianxin District, Changsha, Hunan; China
- Coordinates: 28°11′06″N 112°58′37″E
- Operated by: Changsha Metro
- Line(s): Line 3
- Platforms: 2 (1 island platform)

History
- Opened: 28 June 2020; 4 years ago

Services
| Preceding station | Changsha Metro | Following station |
|---|---|---|
| Fubuhe towards Shantang | Line 3 | Houjiatang towards Guangsheng |

Lingguandu station (Chinese: 灵官渡站; pinyin: Língguāndù Zhàn) is a subway station in Tianxin District, Changsha, Hunan, China, operated by the Changsha subway operator Changsha Metro. It entered revenue service on 28 June 2020.

== History ==
The station started the test operation on 30 December 2019. The station opened on 28 June 2020.

== Surrounding area ==
- Changsha Xiang River Scenery Belt
- Site of Hunan First Normal University
