= Guihua Park station =

Metro station in Changsha, China

Guihua Park station 桂花公园站
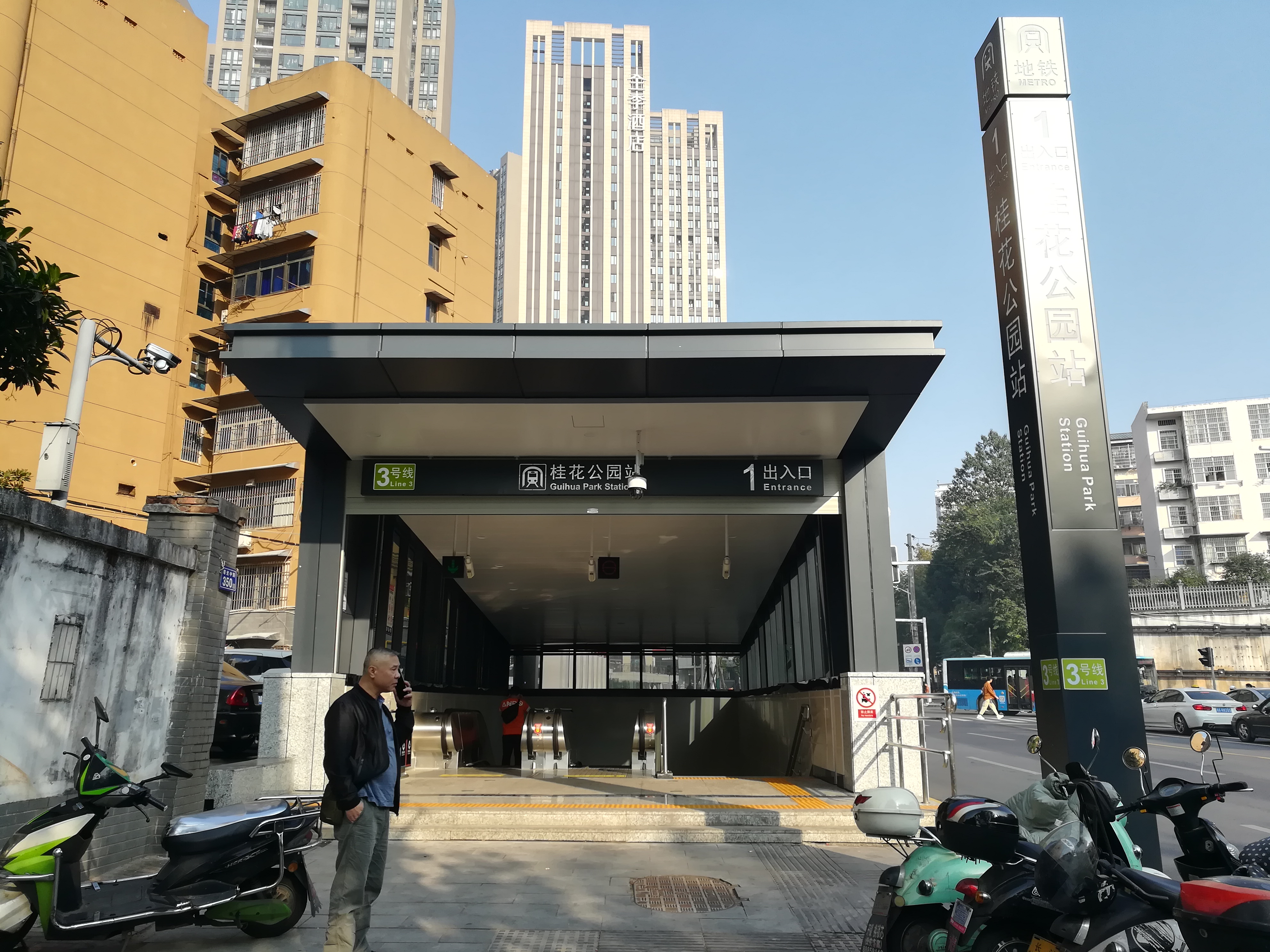

General information
- Location: Tianxin District, Changsha, Hunan; China
- Coordinates: 28°10′31″N 112°59′59″E
- Operated by: Changsha Metro
- Line: Line 3
- Platforms: 2 (1 island platform)

History
- Opened: 28 June 2020; 5 years ago

Services
Preceding station	Changsha Metro	Following station
Dongtang towards Xiangtan North Railway Station	Line 3	Emiling towards Guangsheng
Location

Guihua Park station (Chinese: 桂花公园站; pinyin: Guìhuā Gōngyuán Zhàn) is a subway station in Tianxin District, Changsha, Hunan, China, operated by the Changsha subway operator Changsha Metro. It entered revenue service on 28 June 2020.

== History ==
The station started the test operation on 30 December 2019. The station opened on 28 June 2020.

== Surrounding area ==
- Fragrans Park
- Changsha Intermediate People's Court
- Changsha National Civil Servant Training Center
