= Dongtang station =

Subway station in Changsha, Hunan, China

Dongtang station 东塘站
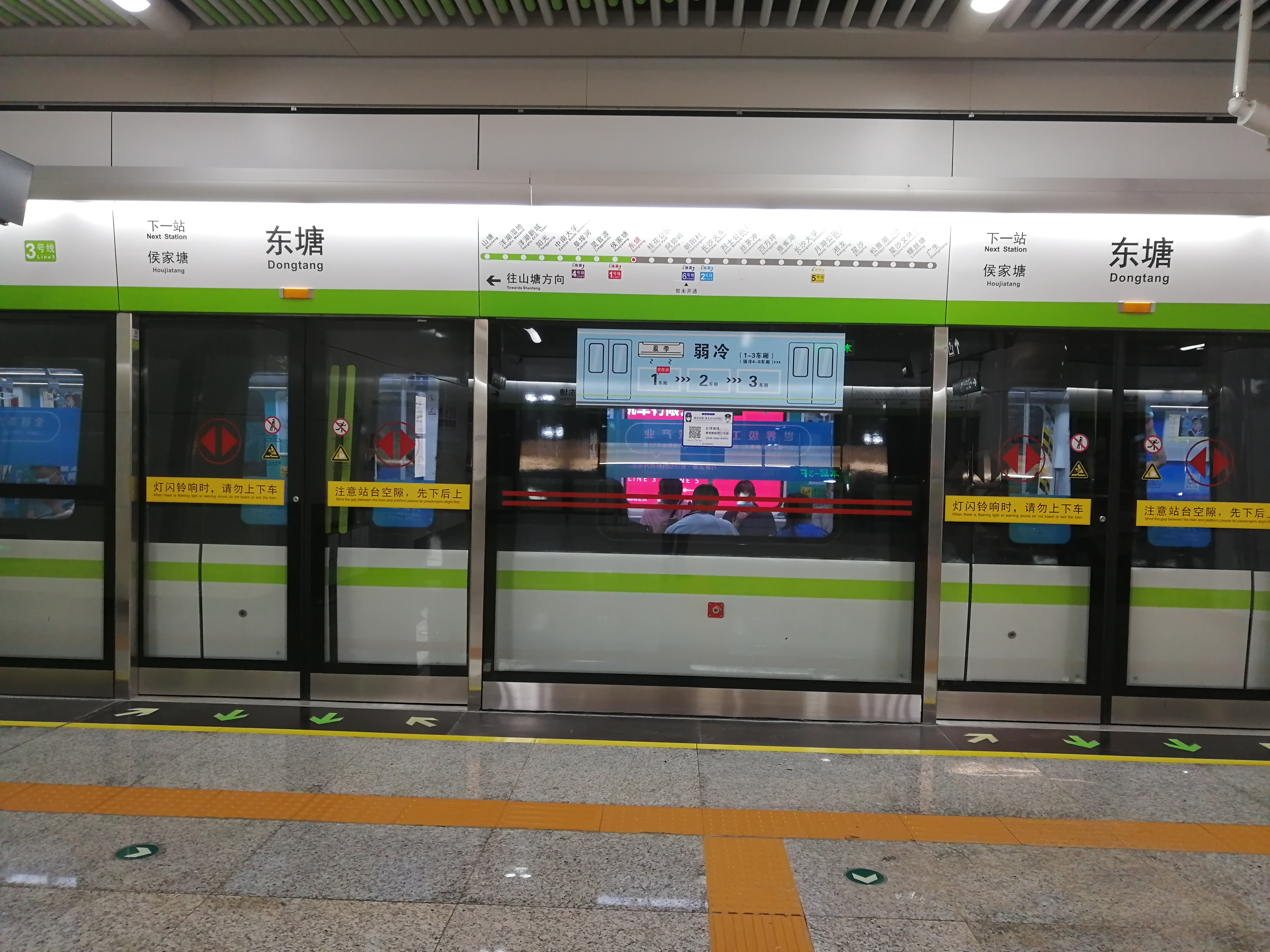

General information
- Location: Tianxin District, Changsha, Hunan; China
- Coordinates: 28°10′31″N 112°59′59″E
- Operated by: Changsha Metro
- Line(s): Line 3
- Platforms: 2 (1 island platform)

History
- Opened: 28 June 2020; 4 years ago

Services
Preceding station	Changsha Metro	Following station
Houjiatang towards Shantang	Line 3	Guihua Park towards Guangsheng

Dongtang station (Chinese: 东塘站; pinyin: Dōngtáng Zhàn) is a subway station in Tianxin District, Changsha, Hunan, China, operated by the Changsha subway operator Changsha Metro. It entered revenue service on 28 June 2020.

== History ==
The station started the test operation on 30 December 2019. The station opened on 28 June 2020.

== Surrounding area ==
- Hunan University of Chinese Medicine
- Xiaoxiang Film Studio
- Hunan Children's Hospital
- Hunan Provincial Department of Water Resources
