= Chuanxingshan station =

Subway station in Hunan, China

Chuanxingshan station 船形山站
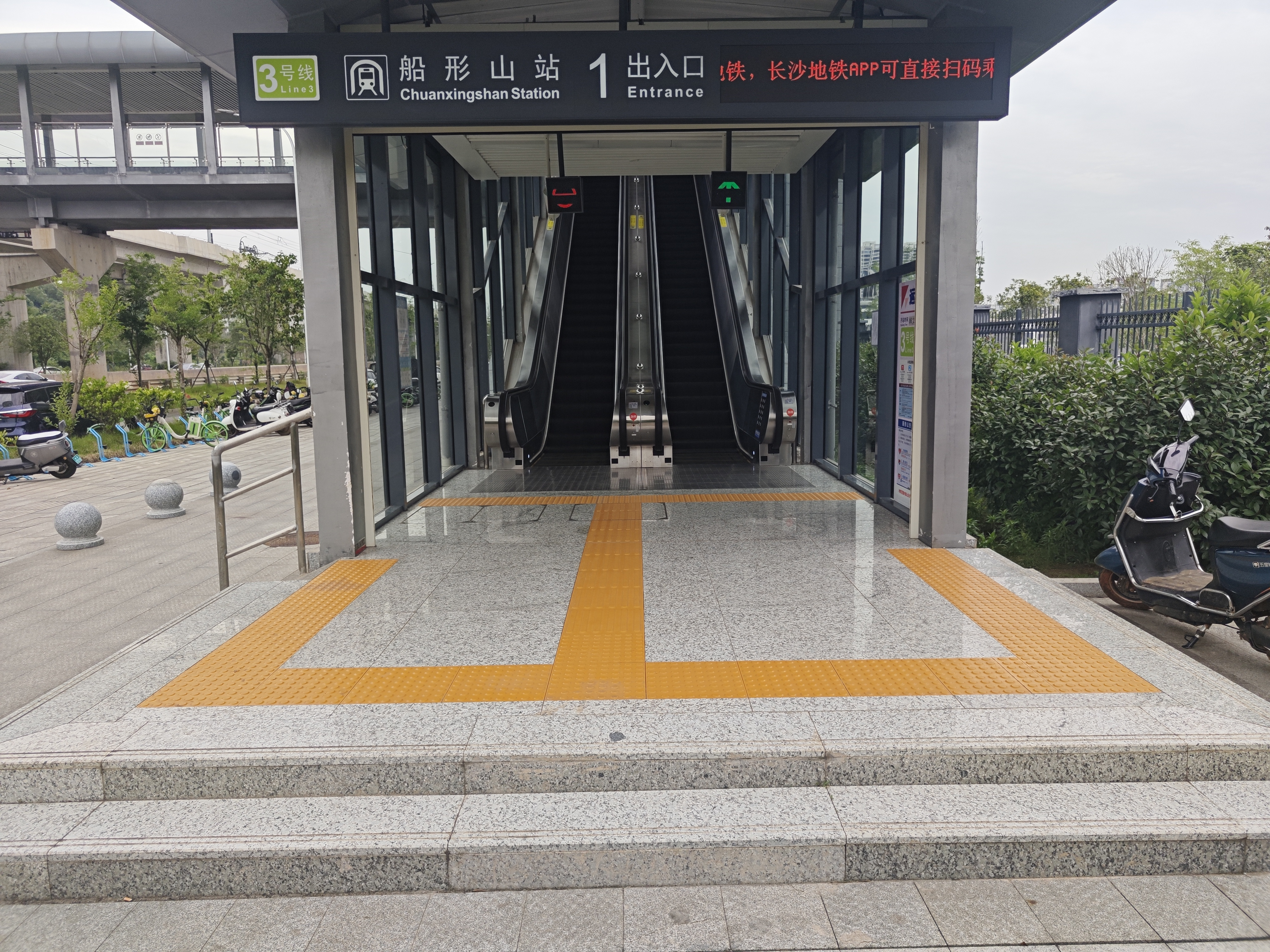
- Entrance 1

Chinese name
- Chinese: 船形山站
Transcriptions
Standard Mandarin
- Hanyu Pinyin: Chuánxíngshān Zhàn

General information
- Location: Yuhu District of Xiangtan, Hunan; China
- Coordinates: 27°59′8.78″N 112°57′21.55″E
- Operated by: Changsha Metro
- Line: Line 3
- Platforms: 2 (1 island platform)

History
- Opened: 28 June 2023; 2 years ago

Services
Preceding station	Changsha Metro	Following station
Xiangtan North Railway Station Terminus	Line 3	Huangjiawan towards Guangsheng
Location

Chuanxingshan station is a subway station in Yuhu District of Xiangtan, Hunan, China, operated by the Changsha subway operator Changsha Metro. It entered revenue service on 28 June 2023.

== History ==
The station opened on 28 June 2023.

== Surrounding area ==
- Hunan Geely Automobile Vocational and Technical College
- Xiangtan Institute of Technology
