= Hunan Martyr's Park =

Park in Changsha, Hunan, China

- 湖南烈士公园
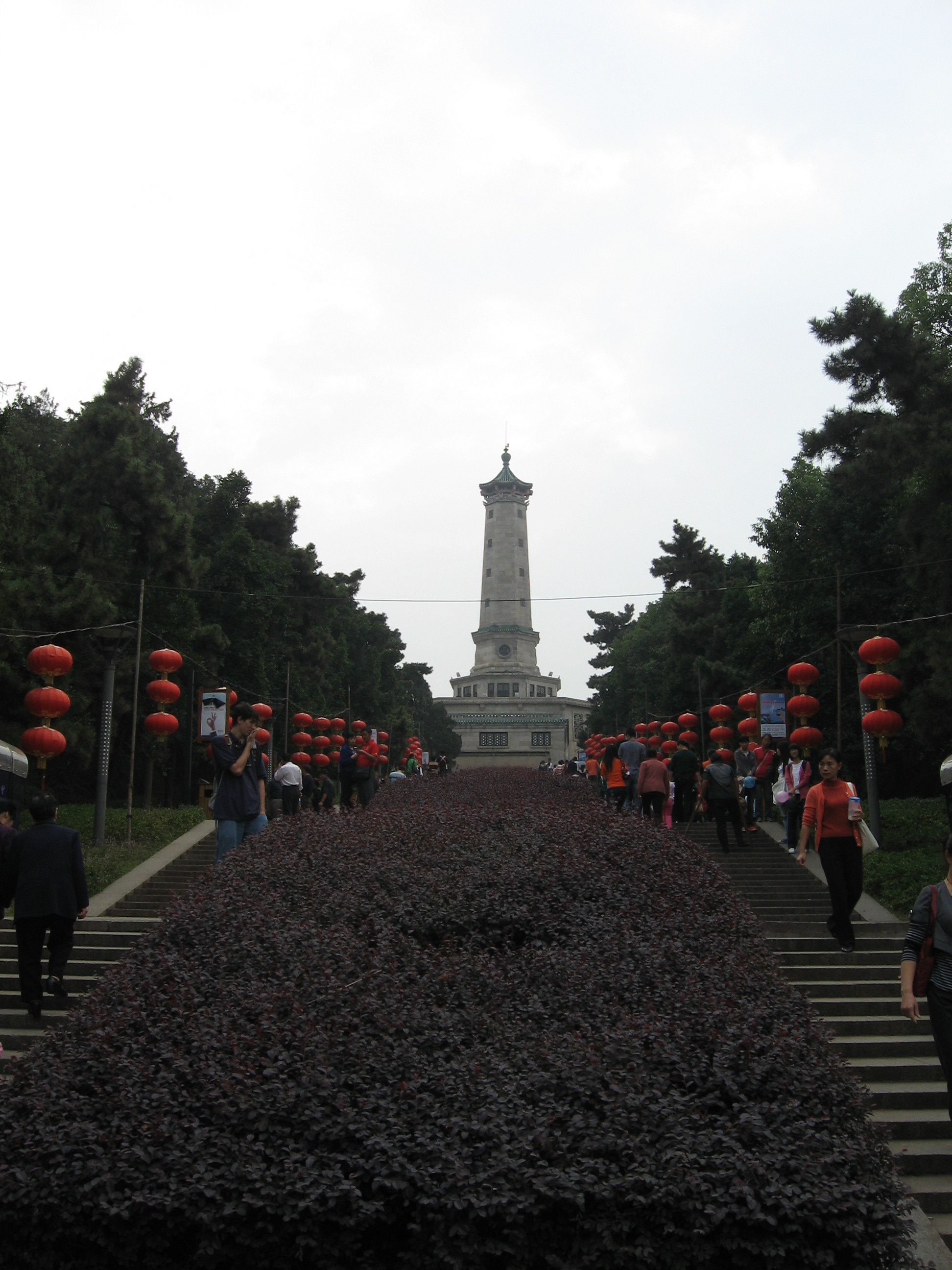
- The Martyr's Monument at Hunan Martyr's Park.

- Location within Hunan Location within China
- Type: Public park, urban park
- Location: Kaifu District, Changsha, Hunan
- Coordinates: 28°12′52″N 112°59′59″E
- Area: 118 hectares (290 acres)
- Created: 1953
- Founder: Changsha government
- Operator: Changsha government
- Visitors: 10 million each year
- Status: Open all year
- Website: hnlsgy.com

Hunan Martyr's Park (simplified Chinese: 湖南烈士公园; traditional Chinese: 湖南烈士公園; pinyin: Húnán Lièshì Gōngyuán) is an urban park and the largest park in Changsha, Hunan, China. Covering 118 hectares (290 acres), the park opened to the public in 1953. It contains memorial sites alongside recreational and tourist areas. Hunan Martyr's Park has been designated as a "Provincial Key Cultural Protection Unit" by the Hunan government and a "National Patriotic Education Base" by the Propaganda Department of the Chinese Communist Party. In 2009, it was categorized as a "National Key Park" by the Ministry of Housing and Urban-Rural Development.

== History ==
Construction of the park began in 1950 on Dongfeng Road in Kaifu District and was completed in 1953, when it opened to the public. The park covers 118 hectares (290 acres), of which about 40% is water. The Three-Arched Bridge (三拱桥) and Yingfeng Bridge (迎丰桥) were built in 1973 and 1982. In 1983 the park was listed as a Provincial Key Cultural Protection Unit by the Hunan government, and the Hunan Folk Culture Village (湖南民俗文化村) was added in 1992. The park has admitted visitors free of charge since May 2000, and was renovated in 2007.

== Climate ==
Hunan Martyr's Park enjoys a subtropical humid monsoon climate and exhibits four distinct seasons, with an average annual temperature of 17.21 °C. Spring and fall are warm, while winter is chilly with cold wind. Winter temperatures average around 5 °C. Summers are very hot and dry with a July daily average of 29 °C.

== Plant resources ==
The park contains 326 plant species in 35 families and 172 genera, including more than 100,000 trees. Its conifers include Japanese black pine from nearby Mount Heng, Himalayan cedar, golden larch from Nanjing, and native podocarpus.

== Parks ==
The park has two main sections, a memorial area and a sightseeing area, subdivided into six specialized gardens: the Martyr's Memorial Garden (烈士纪念园), the People's Leisure Garden (百姓休闲园), the Water Scenery Garden (水域风光园), the Folk Culture Garden (民俗风情园), the Children's Playground (儿童游乐园), and the Landscape Recreation Garden (山水休闲园).

== Tourist attractions ==
=== Martyr's Monument ===
The Martyr's Monument was built in 1959 in two segments: a monument above and a memorial hall below. It stands 58.7 metres (193 ft) tall and is made of 2,932 pieces of white marble and granite. An inscription by Mao Zedong on the monument reads "The Monument of Hunan Martyr's Park" (湖南烈士公园纪念碑). There are over 90 martyrs' portraits and the famous sayings collected from more than 100,000 Hunan martyrs in the memorial hall.

=== Nianjia Lake ===
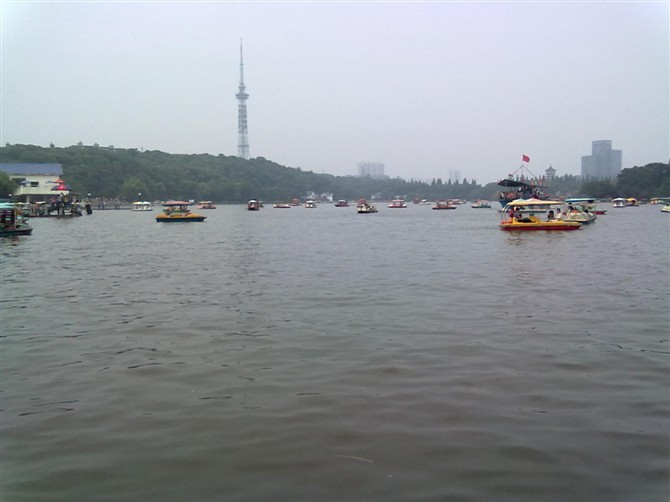
The Nianjia Lake in Hunan Martyr's Park.

Nianjia Lake (Chinese: 年嘉湖; pinyin: Niánjiā Hú), is a man-made lake with an area of 46.6 hectares (115 acres).

=== Yingfeng Bridge ===
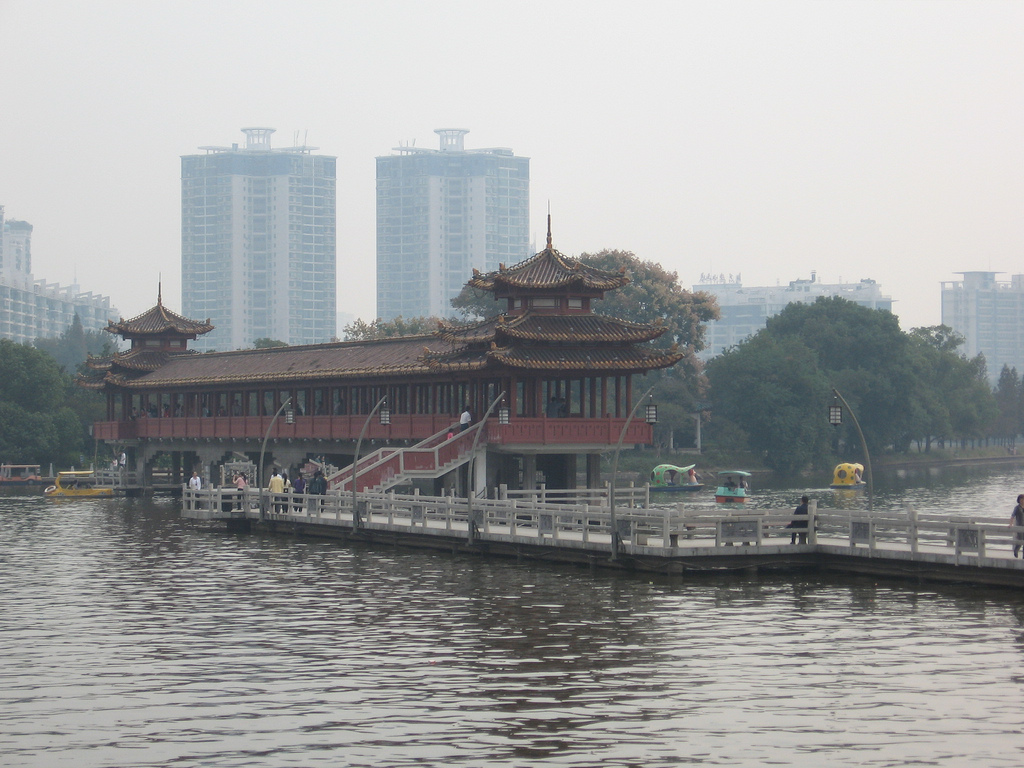
The Yingfeng Bridge.

The Yingfeng Bridge (Chinese: 迎丰桥; pinyin: Yíngfēng Qiáo), built of wood and brick in imitation Song-dynasty style (仿宋风格), connects the shore to the islands and is more than 254.5 metres (835 ft) long.

=== Mid-lake island ===
The Mid-lake islands (湖心岛), also known as Xiaoyang Island (Chinese: 宵阳岛; pinyin: Xiāoyáng Dǎo), were built in 1963 as four islands covering 2.00 hectares (4.94 acres).

=== Ferry of the Red Army ===
In July 1930, Peng Dehuai led the Red Army's 3rd Army Group (红三军团) across the Huji Ferry (Chinese: 湖迹渡; pinyin: Hújì Dù) on the Liuyang River to attack Changsha. After the establishment of Hunan Martyr's Park, Huji Ferry was placed under the Hunan Martyr's Park management and renamed the "Ferry of the Red Army" (红军渡).

== Transportation ==
The park is served by Line 3 of the Changsha Metro at Martyrs Park East station,

and by bus route 111 to the park's south gate (烈士公园南门).
