= Hongqiao station (Changsha Metro) =

Subway station in Hunan, China

Hongqiao station 红桥站
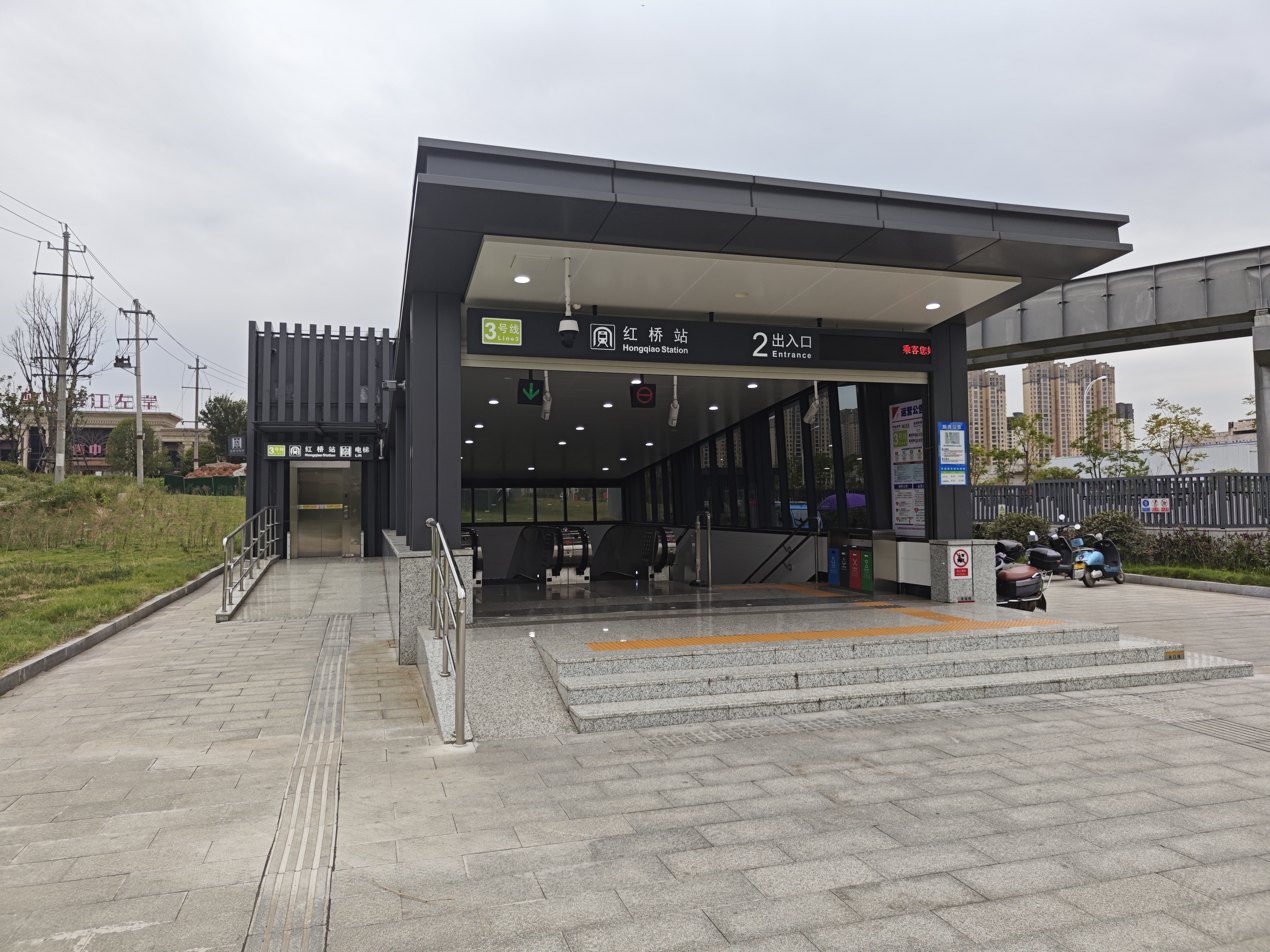
- Entrance 2

Chinese name
- Simplified Chinese: 红桥站
- Traditional Chinese: 紅橋站
Transcriptions
Standard Mandarin
- Hanyu Pinyin: Hóngqiáo Zhàn

General information
- Location: Yuelu District of Changsha, Hunan; China
- Coordinates: 28°03′45″N 112°54′15″E
- Operated by: Changsha Metro
- Line(s): Line 3
- Platforms: 2 (1 island platform)

History
- Opened: 28 June 2023; 2 years ago

Services
| Preceding station | Changsha Metro | Following station |
|---|---|---|
| Pingtang towards Shantang | Line 3 | Tongxi towards Guangsheng |
Location

Hongqiao station is a subway station in Yuelu District of Changsha, Hunan, China, operated by the Changsha subway operator Changsha Metro. It entered revenue service on 28 June 2023.

== History ==
The station opened on 28 June 2023.

== Surrounding area ==
- Nanya Xiangjiang Middle School (南雅湘江中学)
- Tongxi Ancient Town (桐溪古镇)
