= Line 3 (Changsha Metro) =

Metro line in Changsha, China

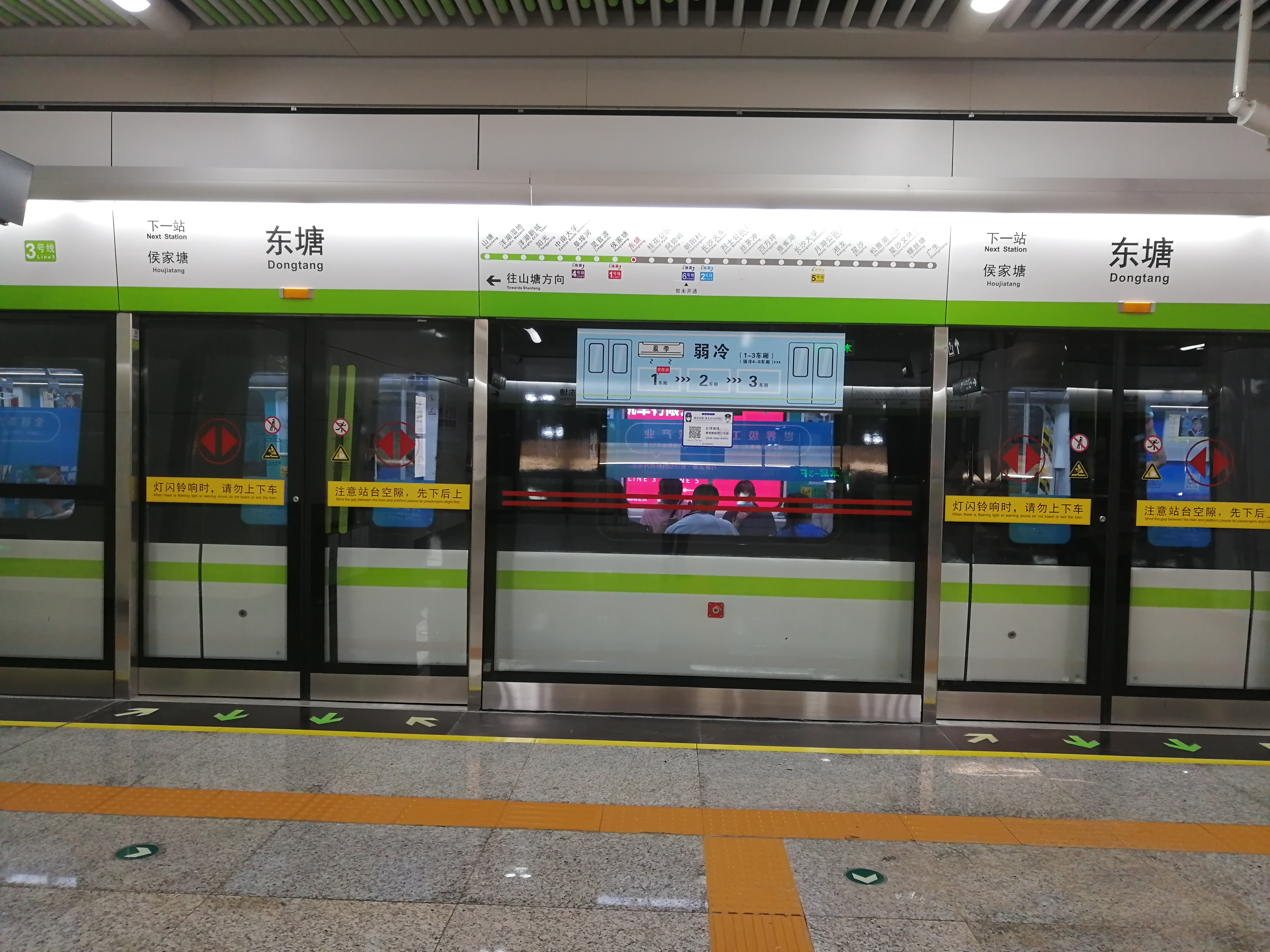
- Line 3 train at Dongtang station

Overview
- Other names: Xihuan Line (Xiangtan section); Changzhutan Intercity West Ring Line, phase 1
- Status: Operational
- Owner: Changsha Government
- Locale: Changsha and Xiangtan, Hunan, China
- Termini: Xiangtan North Railway Station; Guangsheng
- Stations: 33

Service
- Type: Rapid transit
- System: Changsha Metro
- Services: 1
- Operator: Changsha Metro Corporation

History
- Opened: 28 June 2020; 6 years ago

Technical
- Line length: 53.69 km (33.36 mi)
- Num of tracks: 2
- Character: Underground
- Track gauge: 1,435 mm (4 ft 8 1/2 in)

Line 3 of the Changsha Metro (Chinese: 长沙地铁三号线; pinyin: Chǎngshā Dìtiě Sān Hào Xiàn) is a rapid transit and intercity line in the Chinese cities of Changsha and Xiangtan. The first phase opened on 28 June 2020 with 25 stations.

The segment from Dawangshan to Xiangtan North Railway Station opened on 28 June 2023 in the name of Xihuan Line (西环线).

One year later, Xihuan Line is included in Line 3, the former name is cancelled.

== Opening timeline ==
Segment	Commencement	Length	Station(s)	Name
Shantang — Guangsheng	28 June 2020	36.4 km (22.6 mi)	25	Line 3 (Phase 1)
Shantang — Xiangtan North Railway Station	28 June 2023	17.29 km (10.74 mi)	8	Xihuan Line(2023.6.28-2024.6.27) Line 3(2024.6.27-)

== Stations ==
Section	Station name		Connections	Distance km	Location	
Section	English	Chinese	Connections	Distance km	Location	
Southern extension (Xihuan Line)	Xiangtan North Railway Station	湘潭北站	EDQ (Xiangtan North Railway Station) (HSR)		Yuhu	Xiangtan
Southern extension (Xihuan Line)	Chuanxingshan	船形山			Yuhu	Xiangtan
Southern extension (Xihuan Line)	Huangjiawan	黄家湾			Yuhu	Xiangtan
Southern extension (Xihuan Line)	Shuanghu	双湖			Yuelu	Changsha
Southern extension (Xihuan Line)	Pingtang	坪塘			Yuelu	Changsha
Southern extension (Xihuan Line)	Hongqiao	红桥	Dawangshan SkyShuttle (Guanyingang) 5		Yuelu	Changsha
Southern extension (Xihuan Line)	Tongxi	桐溪			Yuelu	Changsha
Southern extension (Xihuan Line)	Dawangshan	大王山			Yuelu	Changsha
Phase 1	Shantang	山塘	Dawangshan SkyShuttle		Yuelu	Changsha
Phase 1	Yanghu Wetland	洋湖湿地			Yuelu	Changsha
Phase 1	Yanghu ECO. Town	洋湖新城			Yuelu	Changsha
Phase 1	Yangguang	阳光			Yuelu	Changsha
Phase 1	Central South University	中南大学			Yuelu	Changsha
Phase 1	Fubuhe	阜埠河	4		Yuelu	Changsha
Phase 1	Lingguandu	灵官渡			Tianxin	Changsha
Phase 1	Houjiatang	侯家塘	1		Tianxin	Changsha
Phase 1	Dongtang	东塘	7		Yuhua	Changsha
Phase 1	Guihua Park	桂花公园			Yuhua	Changsha
Phase 1	Emiling	阿弥岭			Yuhua	Changsha
Phase 1	Chaoyangcun	朝阳村	6		Yuhua/Furong	Changsha
Phase 1	Railway Station	长沙火车站	2 CZT CSQ(Changsha railway station)		Furong	Changsha
Phase 1	East Martyrs Park	烈士公园东			Furong	Changsha
Phase 1	Simaochong	丝茅冲			Kaifu	Changsha
Phase 1	Sifangping	四方坪			Kaifu	Changsha
Phase 1	Yaquehu	雅雀湖			Kaifu	Changsha
Phase 1	Changsha University	长沙大学			Kaifu	Changsha
Phase 1	North Yuehu Park	月湖公园北	5		Kaifu	Changsha
Phase 1	Xianglong	湘龙			Changsha County	Changsha
Phase 1	Xingsha	星沙			Changsha County	Changsha
Phase 1	Songya Lake (South)	松雅湖（南）			Changsha County	Changsha
Phase 1	Xingsha Culture and Sports Center	星沙文体中心			Changsha County	Changsha
Phase 1	Luositang	螺丝塘			Changsha County	Changsha
Phase 1	Guangsheng	广生			Changsha County	Changsha
