= Shantang station =

Subway station in Hunan, China

Shantang station 山塘站
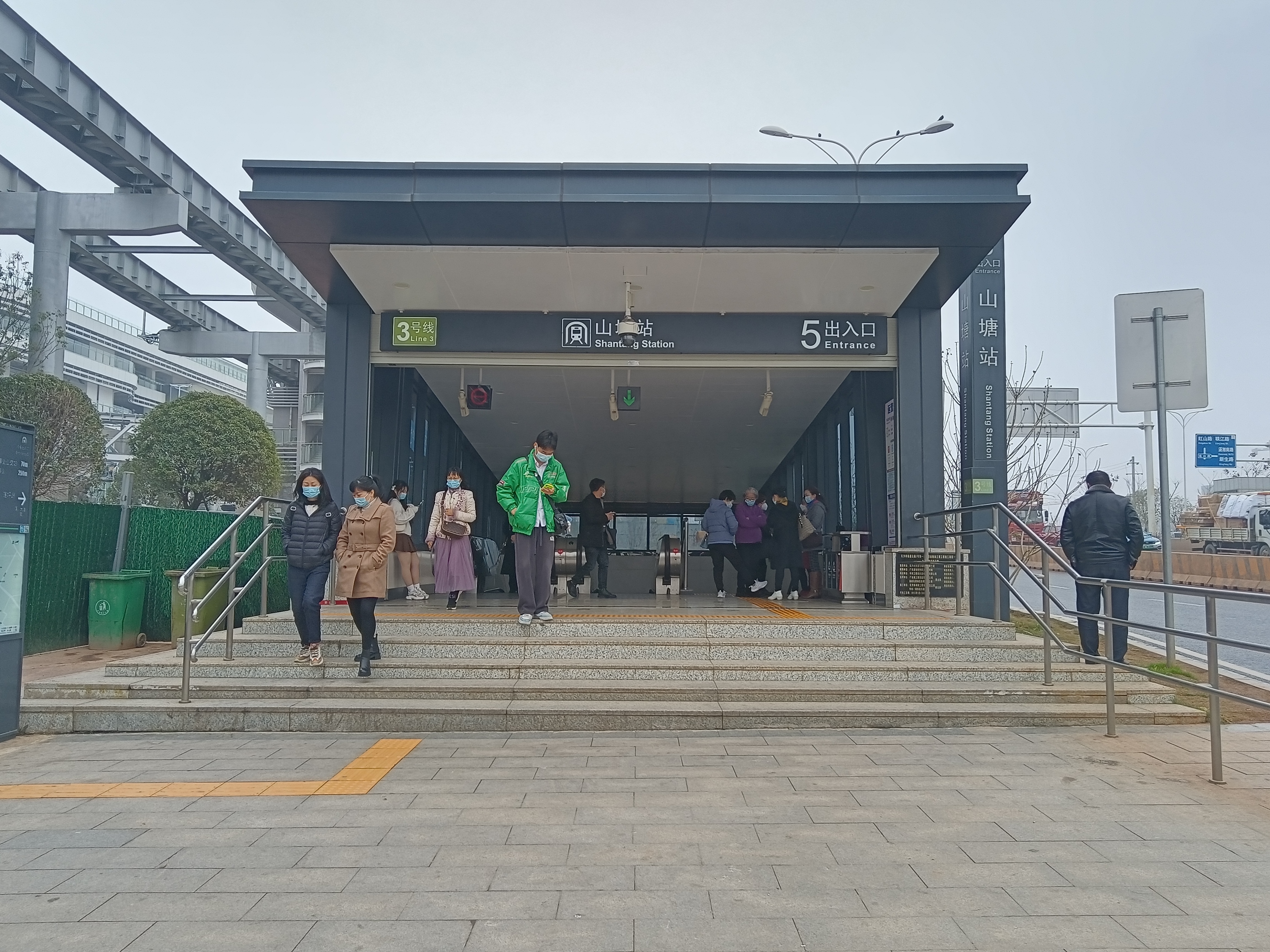

General information
- Location: Yuelu District, Changsha, Hunan; China
- Coordinates: 28°06′17″N 112°55′55″E
- Operated by: Changsha Metro
- Line(s): Line 3
- Platforms: 2 (1 island platform)

History
- Opened: 28 June 2020; 5 years ago

Services
Preceding station	Changsha Metro	Following station
Dawangshan towards Xiangtan North Railway Station	Line 3	Yanghu Wetland towards Guangsheng
Location

Shantang station (Chinese: 山塘站; pinyin: Shāntáng Zhàn) is a subway station in Yuelu District, Changsha, Hunan, China, operated by the Changsha subway operator Changsha Metro. It entered revenue service on 28 June 2020.

== History ==
The station started the test operation on 30 December 2019. The station opened on 28 June 2020.

== Surrounding area ==
- Huayi Brothers Movie Town
- Lion Peak Mountain Forest Park
- Haitang Chunxiao Square
- Lianjiang Park
- City of Joy of Xiang River
