= Xiangtan North railway station =

Railway station in Xiangtan, China

Coordinates: 27.9646°N 112.9425°E

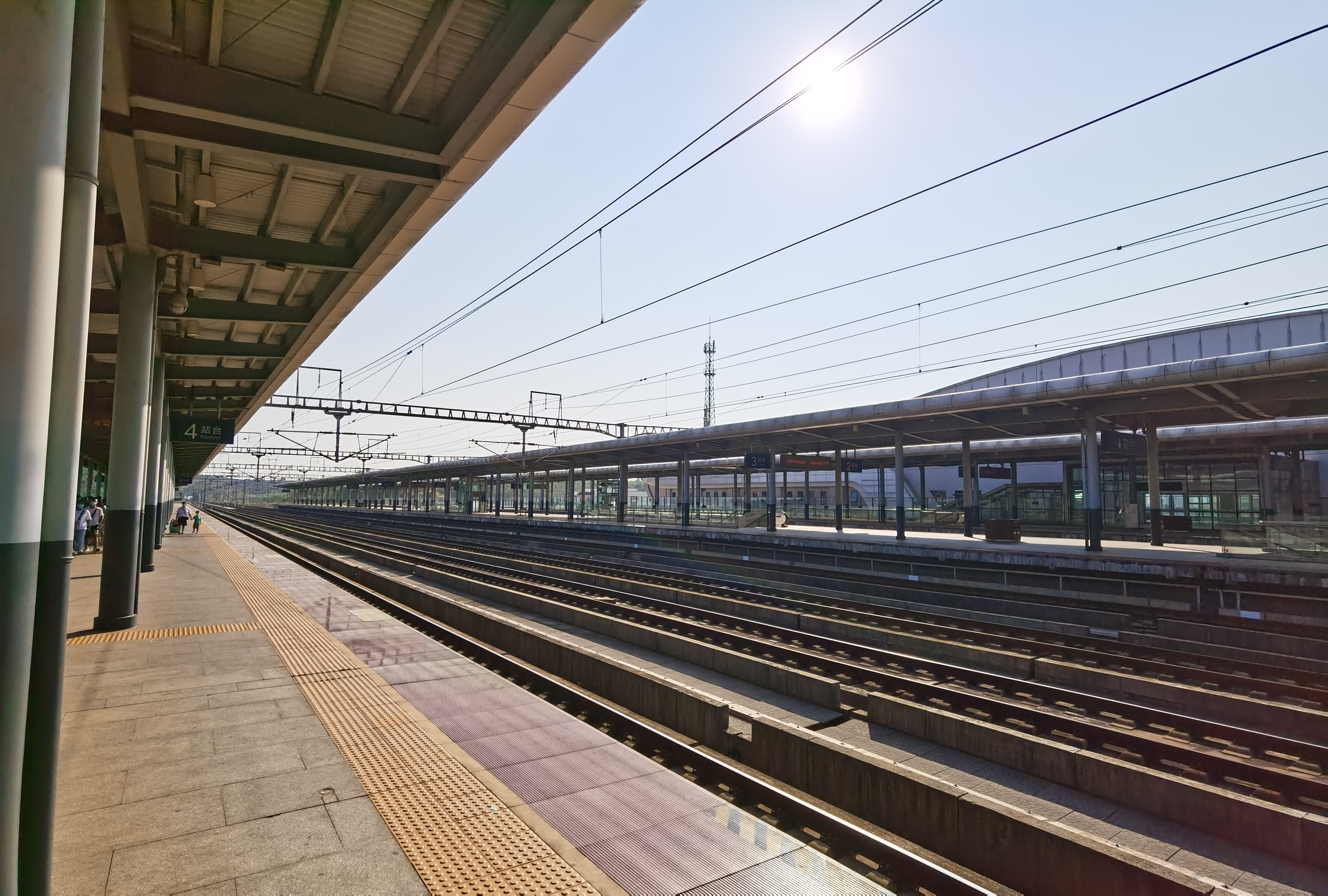
Platforms

Xiangtan North railway station is a railway station of Hangchangkun Passenger Railway located in Yuhu District, Xiangtan, Hunan Province, People's Republic of China.

== Ground Transport ==
- Metro: Since 28 June 2023, Xiangtan North railway station is served by Line 3 of the Changsha Metro.
- Bus:
  - 28 Xiangtan North Railway Station （湘潭北站）to General Bus Station of Hexi(河西公交总站)
  - 67 Xiangtan Institute of Technology（湘潭理工学院）to Xiangtan Railway Station（湘潭火车站）
  - D85 Xiangtan North Railway Station（湘潭北站） to Hetang Intercity Railway Station（荷塘城铁站）
  - K1(To Xiangtan University)、K2(To Hunan Vocational Institute of Technology)、K3（To Yaowan）、K5（Opening Soon）
  - Changsha——Xiangtan Intercity Bus（From the Comprehensive Bonded Zone of Xiangtan to Changsha Qingshui Road）
  - Comprehensive Bonded Zone Special Line of Hedong（综保区河东专线）（From Comprehensive Bonded Zone of Xiangtan to Wanda Square）

Preceding station	China Railway High-speed	Following station
Changsha South towards Shanghai Hongqiao	Shanghai–Kunming high-speed railway	Shaoshan South towards Kunming South
Preceding station	Changsha Metro	Following station
Terminus	Line 3	Chuanxingshan towards Guangsheng
