= Guangsheng station =

Metro station in Hunan, China

Guangsheng station 广生站
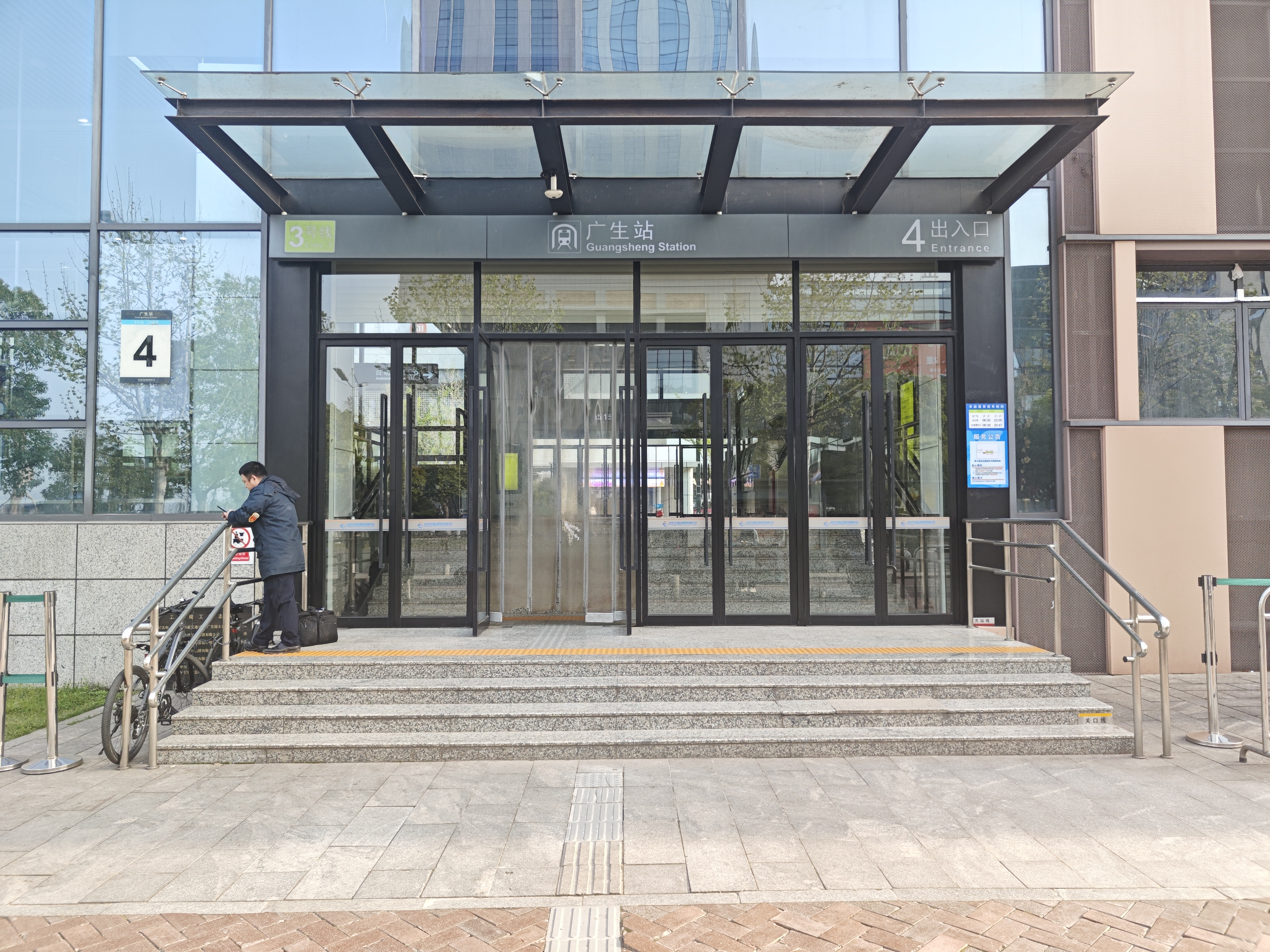
- Entrance 4

General information
- Location: Changsha County, Hunan; China
- Coordinates: 28°14′53″N 113°07′47″E
- Operated by: Changsha Metro
- Line: Line 3
- Platforms: 2 (1 island platform)

History
- Opened: 28 June 2020

Services
Preceding station	Changsha Metro	Following station
Luositang towards Xiangtan North Railway Station	Line 3	Terminus
Location

Guangsheng station (Chinese: 广生站; pinyin: Guǎngshēng Zhàn) is a subway station in Changsha County, Hunan, China, operated by the Changsha subway operator Changsha Metro. It entered revenue service on 28 June 2020.

== History ==
The station started the test operation on 30 December 2019. The station opened on 28 June 2020.

== Surrounding area ==
- Longtang Water Park
