= Shaoyang–Yongzhou high-speed railway =

Shaoyang–Yongzhou high-speed railway simplified Chinese: 邵永高速铁路; traditional Chinese: 邵永高速鐵路; pinyin: Shào yǒng gāosù tiělù

Overview
- Status: Under construction
- Owner: China Railway
- Locale: Hunan
- Termini: Shaoyang; Yongzhou
- Stations: 3

Service
- Operator: CR Guangzhou Group

Technical
- Line length: 96.14 km (59.74 mi)
- Num of tracks: 2
- Track gauge: 1,435 mm (4 ft 8 1/2 in)
- Minimum radius: 7,000 m (23,000 ft) (normal); 5,500 m (18,000 ft) (difficult)
- Electrification: 25 kV 50 Hz AC (overhead line)
- Operating speed: 350 kilometres per hour (220 mph) (design speed)
- Maximum incline: 2.0% (normal)

The Shaoyang–Yongzhou high-speed railway or Shaoyong HSR (simplified Chinese: 邵永高速铁路; traditional Chinese: 邵永高速鐵路; pinyin: Shào yǒng gāosù tiělù) is a line being built between Shaoyang and Yongzhou in Hunan Province, China. It is an important part of the Hohhot–Nanning high-speed railway corridor in the national "Eight Vertical and Eight Horizontal" network high-speed railway network. The line starts from Shaoyang station on the Yiyang–Zhanjiang railway, runs south through Shaoyang County to Yongzhou station, and there will be three stations on the main line. The new line will be 96.14 km (59.74 mi)-long, all of it new construction, of which 43.42 km (26.98 mi) is within Shaoyang City and 52.72 km (32.76 mi) is within Yongzhou City. The main line is built according to the high-speed railway standard and is a double-track electrified passenger dedicated line with a design speed of 350 km/h (220 mph). Related projects include the realignment of the Yiyang–Zhanjiang railway (2.28 km (1.42 mi)) and the construction of the northwest connecting line from Shaoyang station to Xiaoguanling Junction of the Hengyang–Liuzhou intercity railway (11.86 km (7.37 mi)). The design speed of related projects is 120 km/h (75 mph) to 160 km/h (99 mph). There are 85 new bridges on the main line with a total length of 52.693 km (32.742 mi); and 13 tunnels with a total length of 15.175 km (9.429 mi).

== History ==
On 10 October 2022, the first public announcement of the environmental impact assessment for the Shaoyang–Yongzhou HSR was made.

In May 2023, China State Railway Group and the Hunan Provincial People's Government jointly approved the feasibility study report for the construction of the line. The second public announcement of the environmental impact assessment was made on 11 July. The Hunan Provincial Department of Ecology and Environment announced that the environmental impact report for the line had been approved on 28 September. In October, the preliminary design of the line was jointly approved by the Hunan Provincial Government and China State Railway Group.

The construction of the Shaoyang-Yongzhou High-speed Railway commenced on 26 December.
