= Hohhot–Nanning corridor =

High-speed rail in the People's Republic of China

Hohhot–Nanning corridor 呼南通道

Overview
- Status: Partly operational
- Locale: People's Republic of China
- Termini: Hohhot; Nanning

Service
- Type: High-speed rail
- Operator: China Railway High-speed

Technical
- Track gauge: 1,435 mm (4 ft 8 1/2 in) standard gauge
- Electrification: 50 Hz 25,000 V
- Operating speed: 200 to 350 km/h (124 to 217 mph)

The Hohhot–Nanning corridor is a proposed high-speed railway in China running from Hohhot in Inner Mongolia to Nanning in Guangxi. It will pass through the cities of Taiyuan, Zhengzhou, Xiangyang, Changde, Yiyang, Shaoyang, Yongzhou and Guilin. Introduced in 2016, the corridor is one of the sixteen railway lines proposed under China's "Eight Vertical and Eight Horizontal" network.

== Overview ==
The Hohhot–Nanning corridor is a vertically-oriented (north–south) corridor with a liner path emanating from Hohhot in Inner Mongolia. It will travel through the provinces of Shanxi, Henan, Hubei and Hunan, before terminating at Nanning in Guangxi. There are no branch lines.

=== Sections ===
| Name | Route | Design speed (km/h) | Length (km) | Status | Construction start | Opened | Remarks |
|---|---|---|---|---|---|---|---|
| Zhangjiakou–Hohhot HSR | Hohhot East – Ulanqab | 250 | 126 | open | 27 March 2014 | 3 August 2017 | |
| Ulanqab–Datong HSR | Ulanqab – Datong South | 250 reserved for 300km/h | 296 | open | 30 June 2020 | 31 December 2024 | |
| Ulanqab–Datong HSR | Datong South – Shuozhou East – Yuanping West | 250 reserved for 300km/h | 296 | open | 30 June 2020 | 31 December 2024 | |
| Datong–Xi'an HSR | Yuanping West – Taiyuan South | 250 | 139 | open | 3 December 2009 | 28 September 2018 | |
| Taiyuan–Jiaozuo HSR | Taiyuan South – Jiaozuo | 250 | 359 | open | 16 June 2016 | 12 December 2020 | |
| Zhengzhou–Jiaozuo ICR | Jiaozuo – Zhengzhou | 200 | 77.8 | open | 29 December 2009 | 26 December 2015 | |
| Jiaozuo–Pingdingshan HSR | Jiaozuo West – Luoyang Longmen – Pingdingshan West | 350 | 240 | under construction | June 2025 | Expected in 2029 | |
| Zhengzhou–Wanzhou HSR | Zhengzhou East – Pingdingshan West – Xiangyang East | 350 | 350 | open | 31 October 2015 | 1 December 2019 | |
| Xiangyang–Jingmen HSR | Xiangyang East – Jingmen West | 350 | 117 | open | 28 September 2022 | 28 September 2025 | |
| Hankou–Yichang HSR | Jingmen West – Yichang North | 350 | 63 | open | 25 September 2021 | 26 December 2025 | It will initially run on the same tracks as the Jingmen–Yichang section of the Shanghai–Chongqing–Chengdu HSR, but provision will be made for separate tracks. |
| Yichang–Changde HSR | Yichang North – Changde | 350 | 185 | under construction | 26 December 2025 | expected in 2029 | |
| Changde–Yiyang–Changsha HSR | Changde – Yiyang South | 350 | 94 | open | 26 December 2017 | 26 December 2022 | Route shared with Xiamen–Chongqing corridor |
| Yiyang–Loudi HSR | Yiyang South – Loudi South | 350 | 105 | being planned | expected in 2028 | | |
| Yiyang–Zhanjiang railway | Loudi（Loudi South）– Shaoyang | 200 | 98 | open | 28 July 2009 | 6 January 2016 | The line was rebuilt with the duplication and electrification of the original Loudi–Shaoyang section of the Yiyang–Zhanjiang railway |
| Shaoyang–Yongzhou HSR | Shaoyang – Yongzhou | 350 | 96 | under construction | 26 December 2023 | Expected in 2028 | |
| Hengyang–Liuzhou ICR | Yongzhou – Liuzhou | Hengyang–Guilin: 200; otherwise: 250 | 497.9 | open | April 2009 | 28 December 2013 | |
| Liuzhou–Nanning ICR | Liuzhou – Nanning | 250 | 226 | open | 27 December 2007 | 30 December 2013 | |
| Nanning–Hengyang HSR | Yongzhou – Nanning (Note: The high-speed railway line would run parallel to the existing line and is being planned separately by Guangxi) | 350 | | being planned | medium and long term planning | | May be designed as an intercity railway |

== See also ==
- High-speed rail in China
