= Guilin North railway station =

Railway station in Guilin, China

Guilin North Railway Station Gvei-Linz Bwz Can
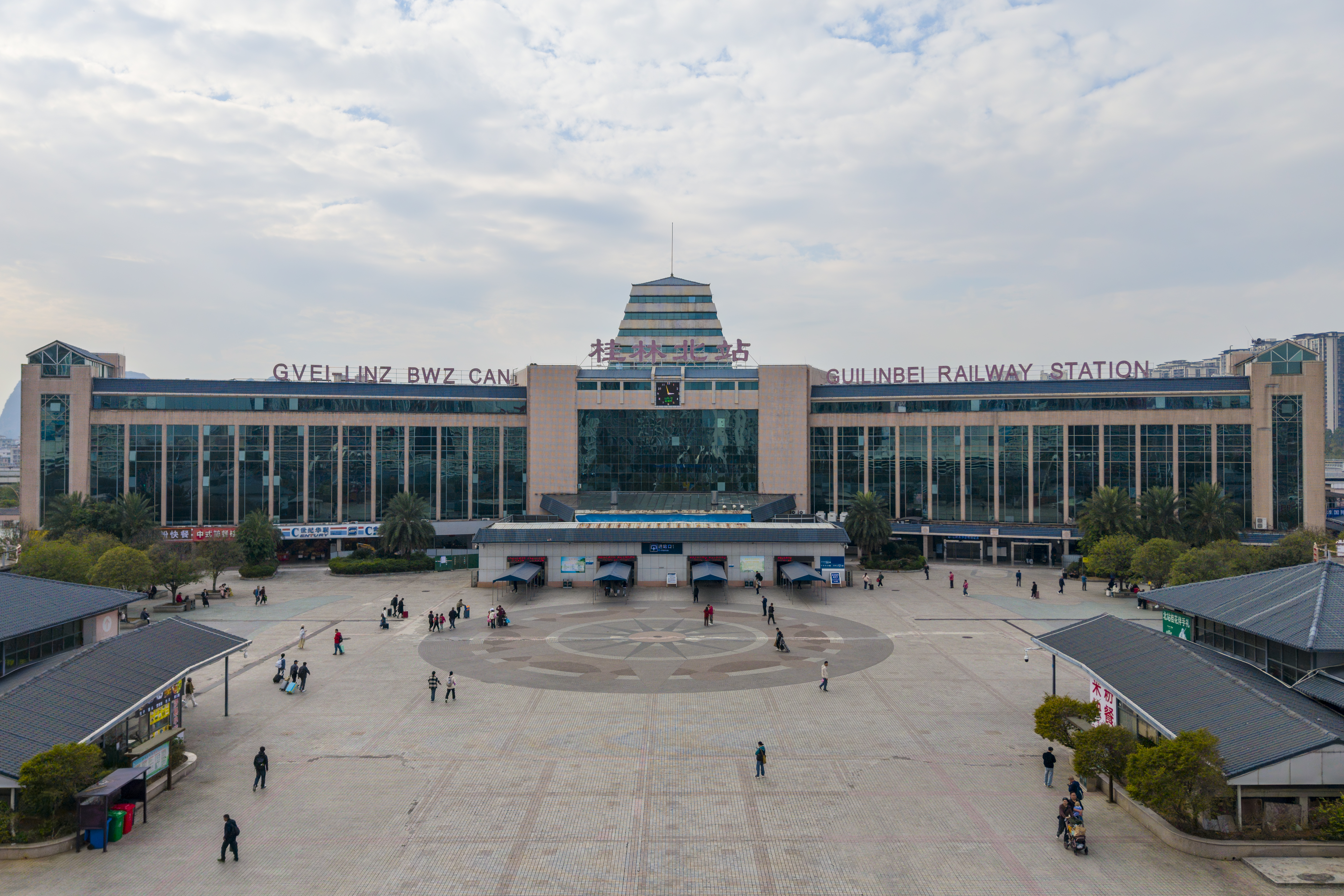

General information
- Other names: Guilinbei Railway Station
- Location: 6 Zhanqian Road, Diecai District, Guilin, Guangxi, China
- Coordinates: 25°19′54.23″N 110°17′46.08″E
- System: High speed rail and conventional rail station
- Operator: Nanning Railway Bureau
- Lines: Hunan–Guangxi railway Guiyang-Guangzhou high-speed railway (branch line); Hengyang–Liuzhou intercity railway
- Platforms: 9
- Tracks: 18
- Bus routes: 1, 18, 32, 100, 211, 303, K99, K301, K301B, K302

Other information
- Station code: 36152

History
- Opened: October 1938 (1st time); November 1947 (2nd time); 10 December 2014 (3rd time)
- Closed: 1944
- Rebuilt: 2013

Key dates
- 1938: Opened
- 1941: grouped under Xianggui Railway administration
- 1957: took over by Liuzhou Railway Bureau
- 2016: proposals for the expansion of the station announced

Services
Preceding station	China Railway High-speed	Following station
Xing'an North towards Hengyang East	Hengyang–Liuzhou intercity railway	Guilin towards Liuzhou
Preceding station	China Railway	Following station
Yongzhou towards Hengyang	Hunan–Guangxi railway	Guilin towards Pingxiang
Yongzhou towards Beijing West	Beijing–Nanning–Hanoi	Liuzhou towards Gia Lâm
Location

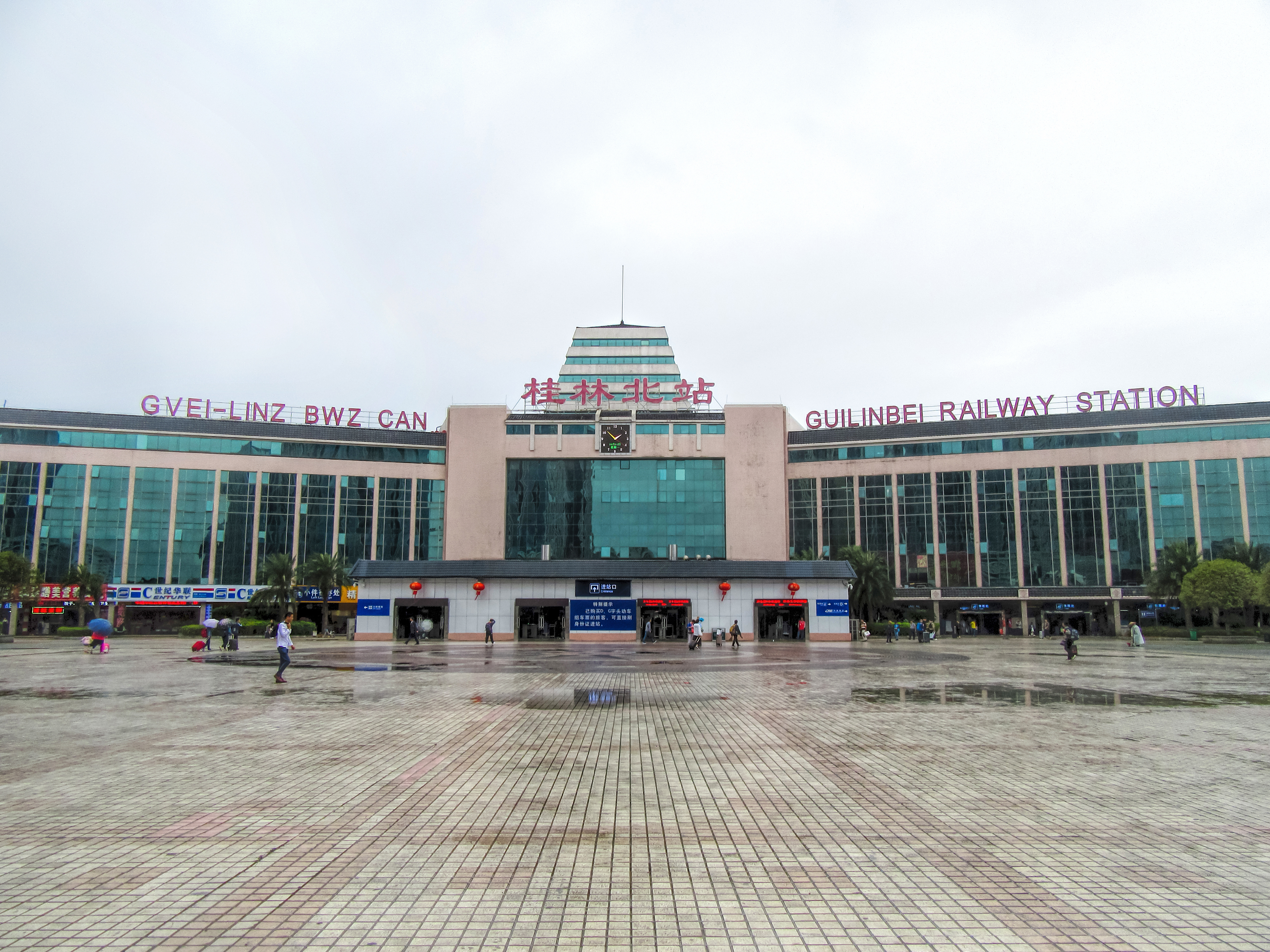
Guilin North Railway Station

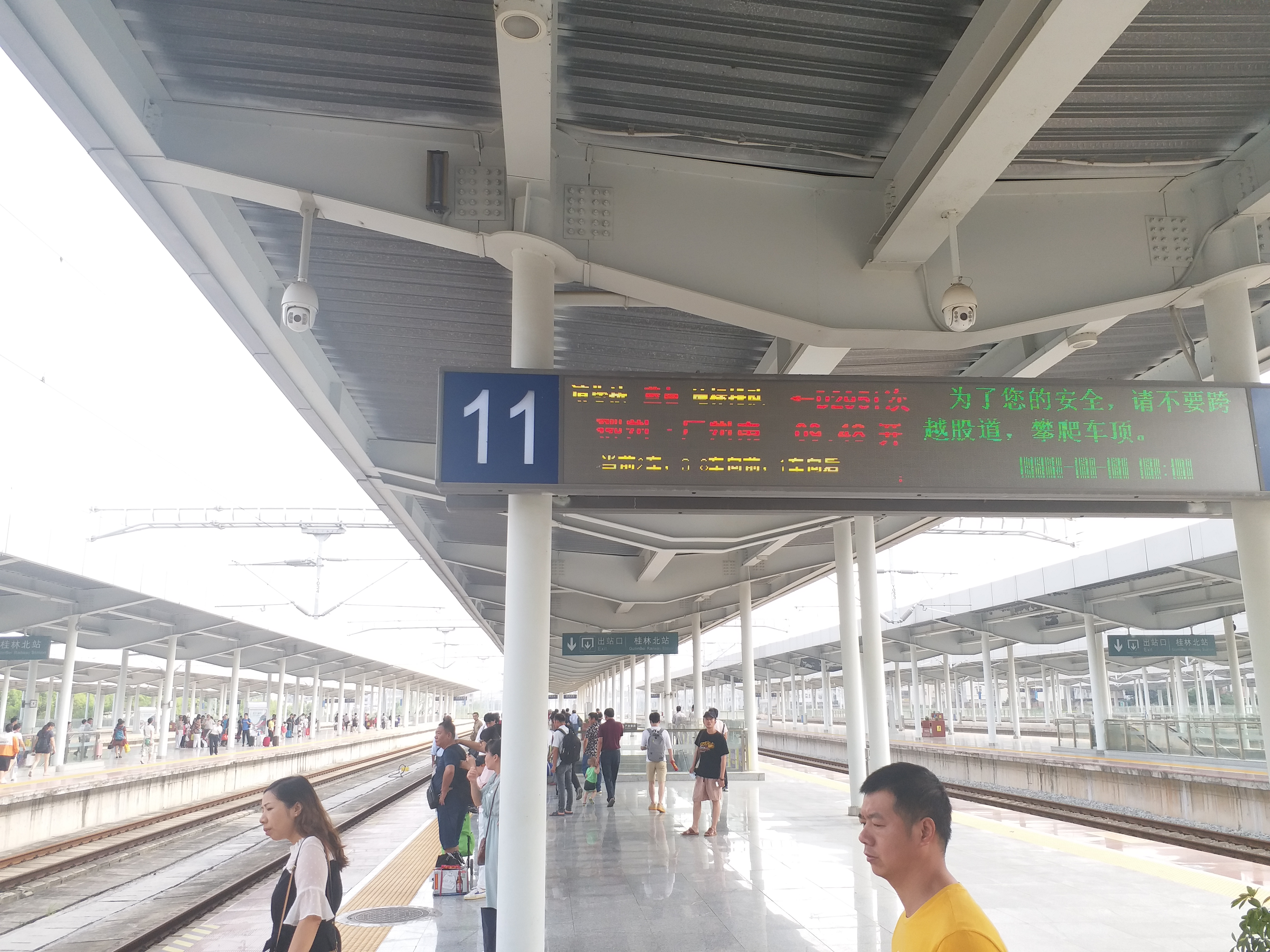
Passengers waiting for train no. D2951 from Liuzhou to Guangzhou South railway station.

Guilin North railway station (Chinese: 桂林北站) is a train station located in Diecai District, Guilin, Guangxi. Opened in 1938, it was renovated in 2013 and reopened on 10 December 2014. It is the second largest train station in Guangxi after Nanning East railway station. Located in 6 Zhanqian Road (Chinese: 站前路), it is on the Lanzhou (Xining)–Guangzhou corridor.

== History ==
In October 1938, the Hengyang-Guilin North section of the Xianggui Railway was opened to traffic, and Guilin North station began service. At that time, there were 5 lanes for trains. The area of the station was then 365.7 square meters, and the cargo storage was 677 sq. m. large. It was under the Xianggui Railway Administration in January 1941. The station was located at the west end of the current Qunzong road (simplified Chinese: 群众路; traditional Chinese: 群眾路).

In 1944, the Japanese army attacked the region, and in response the administration demolished part of the station, along with other facilities. After the Sino-Japanese war ended, and in November 1947 the station resumed service.

After the establishment of the People's Republic of China, in January 1950 Hengyang Railway Bureau repaired the northern section of the Xianggui railway, and both passenger and cargo service resumed. In 1951, 2 extra cargo lanes were added to Guilin North station. In January 1953 Liuzhou Railway Bureau (now Nanning Railway Bureau) took over the station, and in 1957 a warehouse with construction area 532.26 sq. m. was built.

In 1969 the station area was increased to 884 sq. m., and in March 1971 the station was further expanded. In 1983, Liuzhou Railway Bureau rebuilt the ticket selling booth and passenger waiting hall. In December 1985, the length of the platforms were increased from 310m to 560m.

Because Guilin North Station cannot meet the increasing demand for passenger transportation, the station moved north in 2013. In 2014, the rebuilt Guilin North Station was put into use, and had 9 platforms and 18 tracks, with an elevated waiting hall and a west station hall reserved for the long run. In 2016, the Guilin North Comprehensive Passenger Transport Hub project was announced, and planned for Guilin North station West Square to cover an area of 64,403 square meters, and the total construction area of the West Station Building is 391,890 square meters. An elevated reconstruction of the waiting hall was being planned. After the completion of Guilin North Comprehensive Passenger Transport Hub, it will be the largest comprehensive railway transportation hub in the western region, a highly modern railway passenger special station, and a super large-scale structure integrating high-speed rail, conventional trains, rail transit, bus, rental, and coaches.

== Bus services ==
Currently, the following bus routes in Guilin service the train stop:

=== Guilin North bus station ===
Route No.	Termini		
1	Guilin North railway station	↔	Dingfu Building (Chinese: 鼎富大廈)
32	Guilin North railway station	↔	Peace Village (Chinese: 和平村)
83	Linjia Region Hall (Chinese: 临桂区政府)	↔	Guilin North railway station
K99	Binbei Depot (Chinese: 滨北车场)	↔	South Station for buses (Chinese: 汽车客运南站)
100	Guilin North railway station	↔	Peace Village (Chinese: 和平村)
211A	Guilin North railway station	↔	Eastern Cycle Depot (Chinese: 公交东环车场)
211B	Guilin North railway station	↔	Eastern Cycle Depot (Chinese: 公交东环车场)
301	Lingchuan Temporary Bus Depot (Chinese: 公交灵川临时车场)	↔	Guanyin Pavilion (Chinese: 观音阁)
303	Guilin West railway station	↔	Nanzhou Bridge South (Chinese: 南洲大桥南)

=== Guilin North station junction bus station ===
Route No.	Termini		
1	Guilin North Station	↔	Dingfu Building (Chinese: 鼎富大廈)
18	Binbei Depot (Chinese: 滨北车场)	↔	Seven Star Park (Chinese: 七星公园)
32	Guilin North Station	↔	Peace Village (Chinese: 和平村)
83	Linjia Region Hall (Chinese: 临桂区政府)	↔	Guilin North Station
K99	Binbei Depot (Chinese: 滨北车场)	↔	South Station for buses (Chinese: 汽车客运南站)
100	Guilin North Station	↔	Peace Village (Chinese: 和平村)
211A	Guilin North Station	↔	Eastern Cycle Depot (Chinese: 公交东环车场)
211B	Guilin North Station	↔	Eastern Cycle Depot (Chinese: 公交东环车场)
301	Lingchuan Temporary Bus Depot (Chinese: 公交灵川临时车场)	↔	Guanyin Pavilion (Chinese: 观音阁)
302	Lingchuan County 2nd Middle School (Chinese: 灵川县第二中学)	↔	Wu Li Dian (Chinese: 五里店)
302	Lingchuan County 2nd Middle School (Chinese: 灵川县第二中学)	↔	Trade City (Chinese: 商贸城)
