= Daxiang, Shaoyang =

Daxiang 大祥区
- District
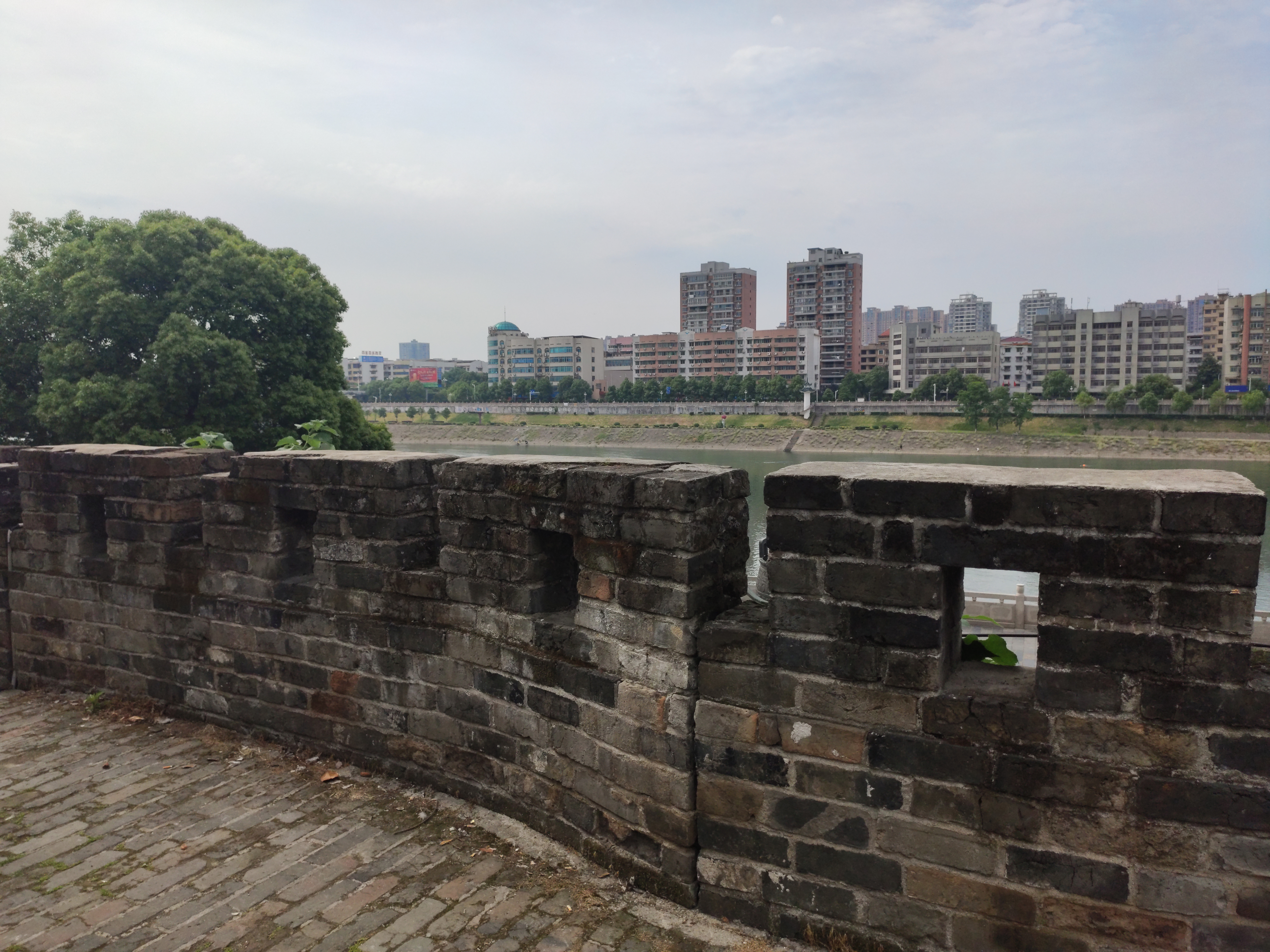

- Location in Hunan
- Coordinates: 27°13′53″N 111°26′06″E
- Country: People's Republic of China
- Province: Hunan
- Prefecture-level city: Shaoyang
- Time zone: UTC+8 (China Standard)

Daxiang District (simplified Chinese: 大祥区; traditional Chinese: 大祥區; pinyin: Dàxiáng Qū) is one of three urban districts in Shaoyang City, Hunan province, China. The district is located in the south of the city proper and on the southeast shore of Zi River, it is bordered by Beita and Shuangqing Districts to the north, Shaodong County to the east, and Shaoyang County to the south and the west. Daxiang District covers an area of 214.66 km^{2} (82.88 sq mi), and as of 2015, it had a permanent resident population of 343,700 and a registered population of 325,200. The district has nine subdistricts, one town and two townships under its jurisdiction. The government seat is Baizhou Community (城南街道白洲社区).

== Administrative divisions ==
It has jurisdiction over the eleven subdistricts of Baichunyuan, Chengbeilu, Chengnan, Chengxi, Cuiyuan, Hongqilu, Huochenanzhan, Tanjiang, Xueyuanlu, Yuxi and Zhongxinlu, the town of Luoshi, and the two townships of Banqiao and Cai'e.

11 subdistricts

- Baichunyuan (百春园街道)
- Chengbeilu (城北路街道)
- Chengnan (城南街道)
- Chengxi (城西街道)
- Cuiyuan (翠园街道)
- Hongqilu (红旗路街道)
- Huochenanzhan (火车南站街道)
- Tanjiang (檀江街道)
- Xueyuanlu (学院路街道)
- Yuxi (雨溪街道)
- Zhongxinlu (中心路街道)

1 town

- Luoshi (罗市镇)

2 townships

- Banqiao (板桥乡)
- Cai'e (蔡锷乡)

== Transportation ==
Shaoyang railway station on the Huaihua–Shaoyang–Hengyang railway and the Luoyang–Zhanjiang railway is located here.
