= Yiyang–Zhanjiang railway =

Railway line in China

Overview
- Native name: 益湛铁路
- Status: Operational
- Owner: China Railway
- Locale: Hunan, Guangxi, Guangdong
- Termini: Yiyang; Maoming East

Service
- Type: Heavy rail

Technical
- Line length: 951 km (591 mi)
- Number of tracks: Loudi–Shaoyang: 2; elsewhere: 1
- Track gauge: 1,435 mm (4 ft 8 1/2 in) standard gauge
- Electrification: Loudi–Shaoyang: 25 kV 50 Hz AC (Overhead line); elsewhere: not electrified
- Operating speed: Loudi–Shaoyang: 200 km/h (120 mph); elsewhere: 140 km/h (87 mph)
- Maximum incline: 1.5%

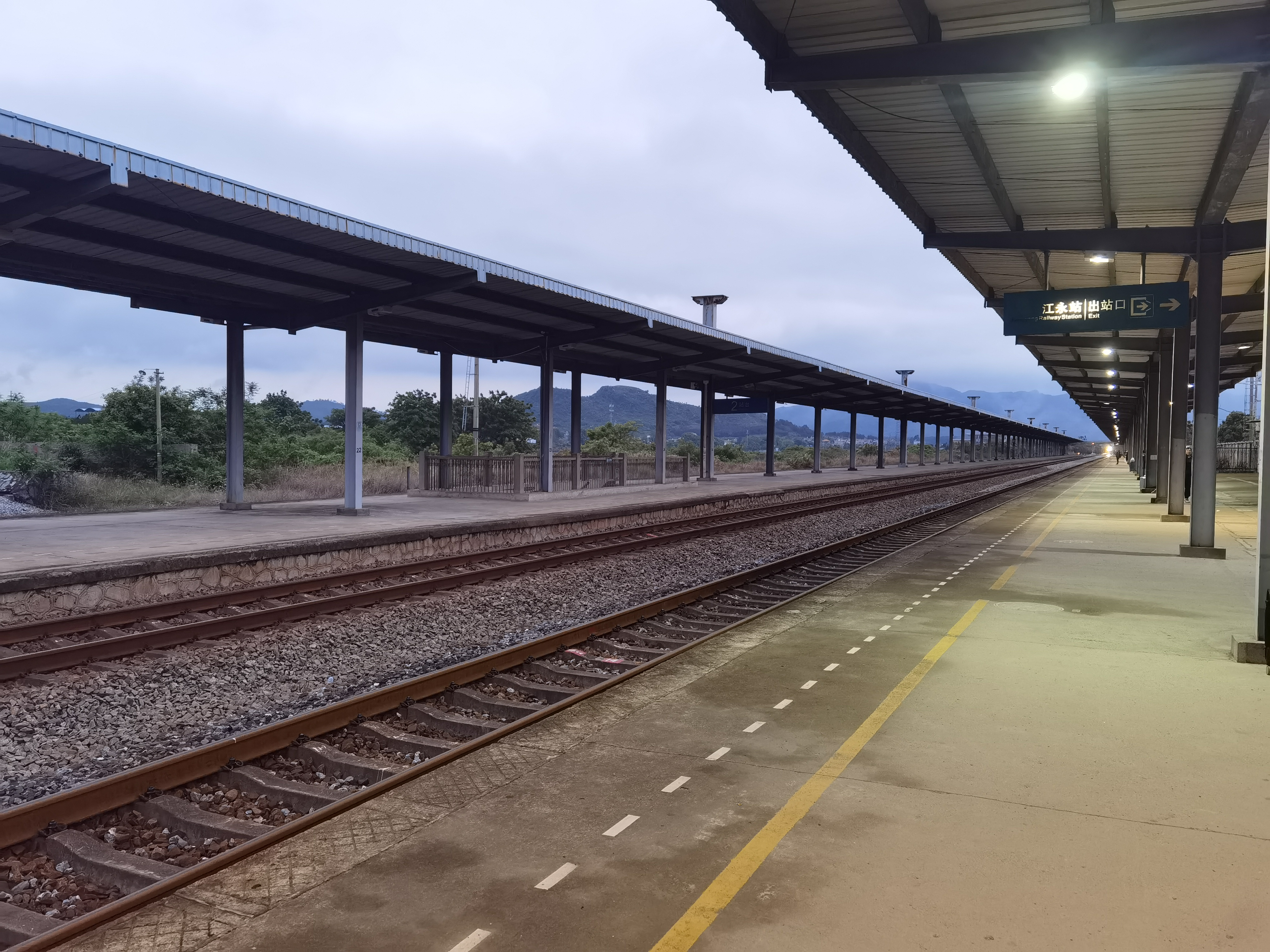
A platform at Jiangyong Station

The Yiyang–Zhanjiang railway or Yizhan railway (Chinese: 益湛铁路; pinyin: Yìzhàn tiělù) is a railway in China between Hunan, Guangxi and Guangdong. The line was built at the beginning of the 21st century as the southern part of a rail corridor called the Luozhan railway running from Luoyang to Zhanjiang. The Yiyang–Zhanjiang railway runs for 951 km (591 mi). There are also branches to Santangpu and Shuangqing) between Yiyang and Maoming East. The part of the line between Loudi and Shaoyang is electrified and has two tracks.

== History ==
Yiyang–Zhanjiang railway was built as part of the Luozhan rail corridor, which runs through four provinces and one autonomous region—Henan, Hubei, Hunan, Guangxi and Guangdong—and is designed to facilitate the shipment of goods from the Chinese interior to the Port of Zhanjiang. The rail corridor was proposed in 1999 and is a combination of pre-existing railways and new railway sections built as part of the new route. The new railway sections filled a gap in the railway network of South Central China between the Beijing-Guangzhou and Jiaozuo–Liuzhou railways. The Luozhan line is composed of seven sections, consisting of three pre-existing railways built prior to 1999, and four new railway sections built for the Luozhan line. From Luoyang, the line follows the pre-existing Jiaozuo–Liuzhou railway to Shimen in northern Hunan Province. From Shimen, the line follows the pre-existing Shimen–Changsha railway through Changde to Yiyang, in north central Hunan.

A single-track and non-electrified line with construction starting in December 2000 and opened between Yiyang and Shaoyang in July 2006. From Yongzhou, a new, 566 km (352 mi) railway to Yulin in eastern Guangxi Autonomous Region via Lingling, Dao County, Jianghua, Fuchuan, Zhongshan County, Hezhou, Wuzhou, Cenxi, Rong County (Guangxi) and Beiliu, was built from December 2004 to July 2009.

From Yulin, the Luozhan line, as originally planned, follows the pre-existing Litang–Zhanjiang railway to Zhanjiang, in southwestern Guangdong Province. Subsequently a more direct route was built to Zhanjiang in eastern Guangxi via Cenxi, just north of Yulin, and Maoming. From Cenxi, a 151.83 km (94 mi) single-track electrified section to Maoming in neighboring Guangdong via Xinyi and Gaozhou opened on January 3, 2011. From Maoming, a 103 km (64 mi) section to Zhanjiang, opened on December 28, 2013.

The section between Loudi and Shaoyang was rebuilt as a two-track, electrified railway and opened on 6 January 2016.

== Rail connections ==
- Yiyang: Shimen–Changsha railway to Changsha and Shimenxian North
- Loudi: Shanghai–Kunming railway to Shanghai and Kunming
- Shaoyang: Huaihua–Shaoyang–Hengyang railway to Huaihua South and Hengyang East
- Yongzhou: Hengyang–Liuzhou intercity railway to Hengyang and Liuzhou
- Cenxi: Maluwei–Yulin railway to Yulin

== See also ==
- List of railways in China
