= Yongzhou railway station =

Railway station in Yongzhou, Hunan

Yongzhou 永州
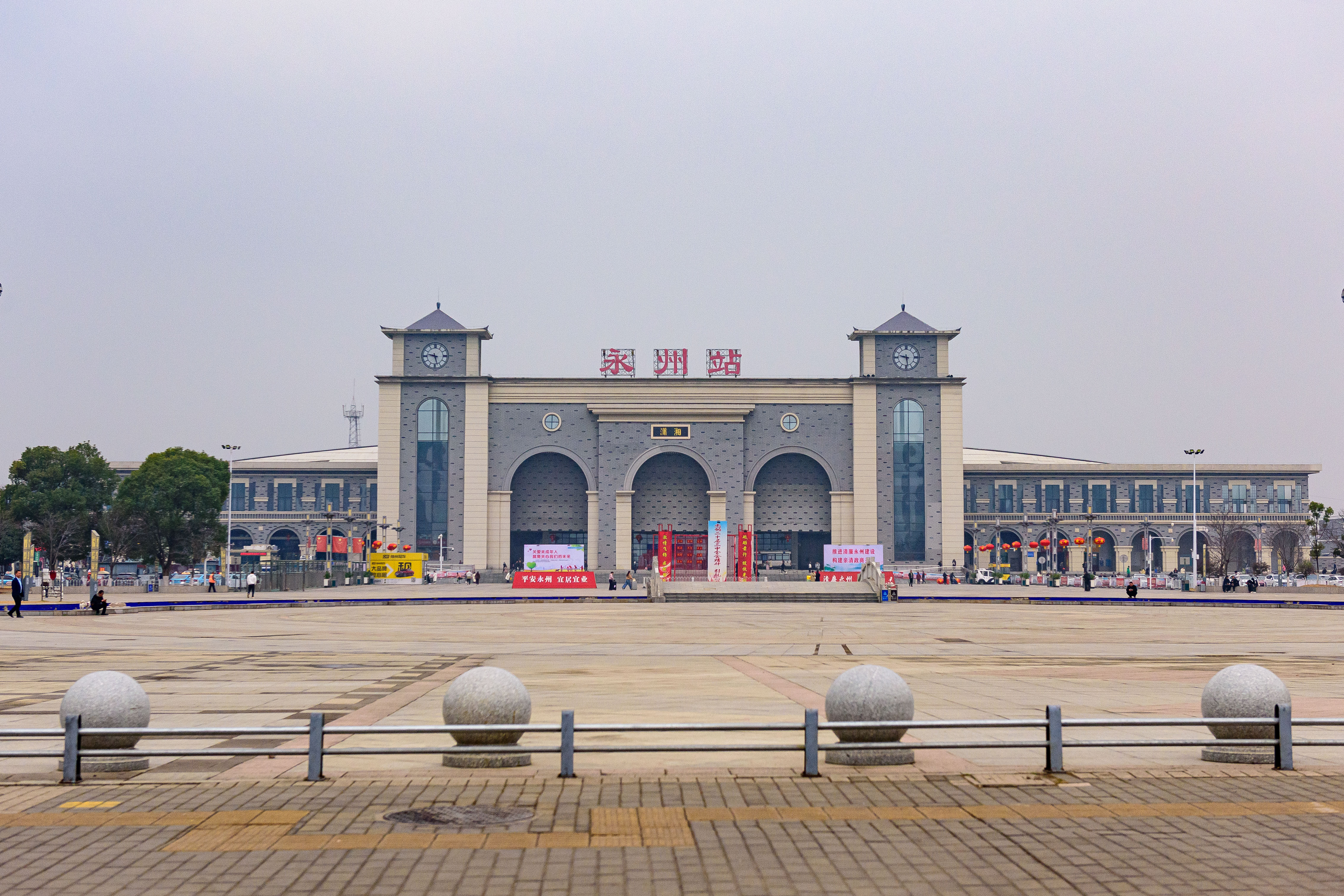
- Yongzhou railway Station in 2025

General information
- Location: Lengshuitan District, Yongzhou, Hunan; China
- Coordinates: 26°27′26.50″N 111°33′53.33″E
- Operated by: China Railway Guangzhou Group
- Line(s): Hunan–Guangxi railway Luoyang–Zhanjiang railway Hengyang–Liuzhou intercity railway
- Platforms: 5

Other information
- Station code: TMIS code: 35801; Telegraph code: AOQ; Pinyin code: YZH

History
- Opened: April 18, 2004

Services
Preceding station	China Railway High-speed	Following station
Qiyang towards Hengyang East	Hengyang–Liuzhou intercity railway	Dong'an East towards Liuzhou
Preceding station	China Railway	Following station
Hengyang Terminus	Hunan–Guangxi railway	Guilin West towards Pingxiang
Hengyang Terminus	Hunan–Guangxi railway	Guilin North towards Pingxiang
Hengyang towards Beijing West	Beijing–Nanning–Hanoi	Guilin North towards Gia Lâm

Yongzhou railway station (Chinese: 永州站) is a railway station located in Lengshuitan District, Yongzhou, Hunan, China.

The station is under the Hengyang section of China Railway Guangzhou Group and has five platforms.

== History ==
Yongzhou railway station opened on its current site on 18 April 2004, replacing the older Yongzhou railway station, which was simultaneously renamed Yongzhou East. All passenger services transferred to the new station, and Yongzhou East became a freight-only station.
