= Qidong railway station =

Qidong railway station may refer to:

- Qidong railway station (Hunan)
- Qidong railway station (Jiangsu)
