= Chenxi railway station =

Railway station in Huaihua, China

Coordinates: 27.8818°N 110.2508°E

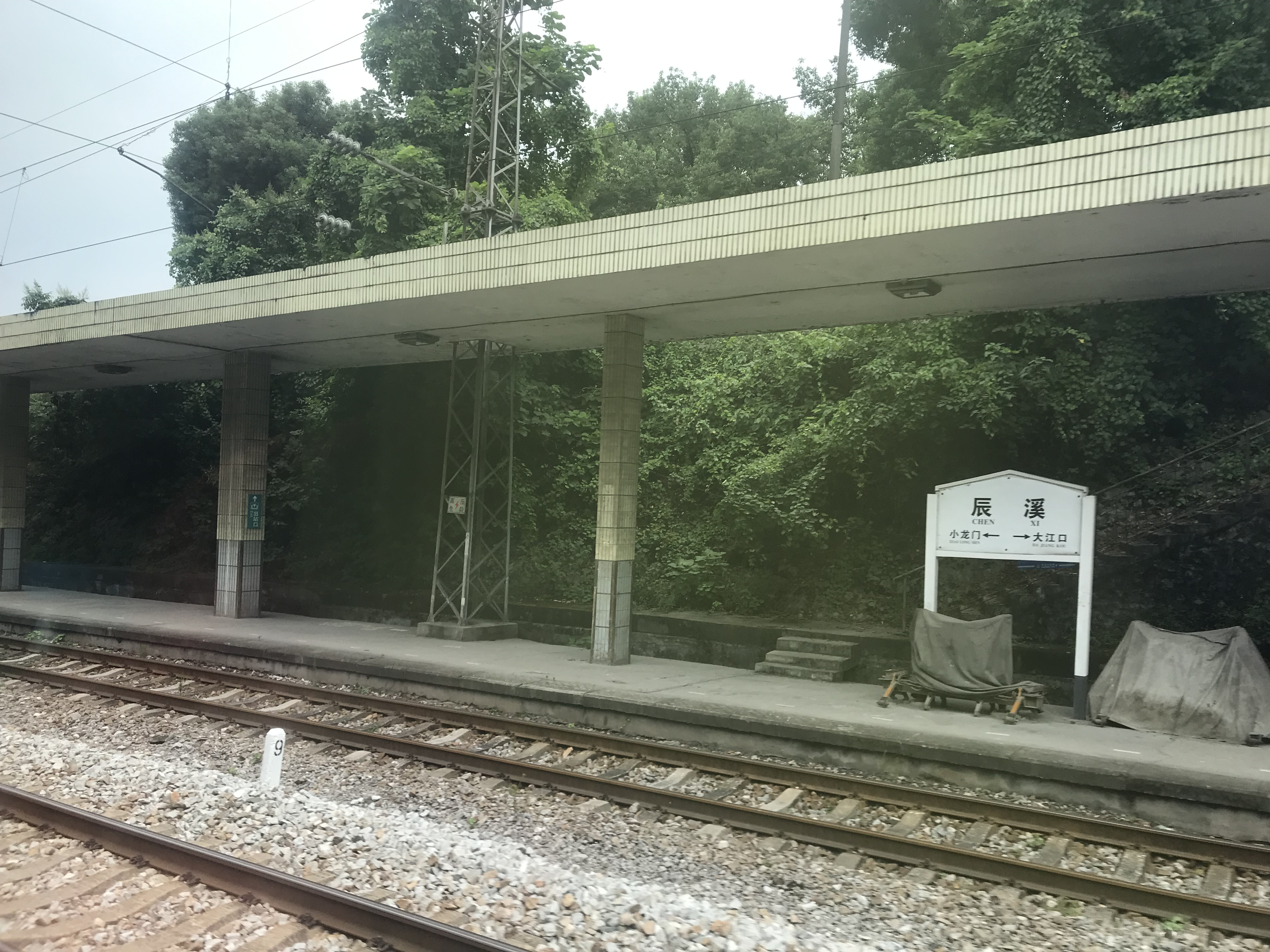
Nameboard

Chenxi railway station is a fourth-class railway station in Huomachong Town, Chenxi County, Huaihua, Hunan on the Zhuzhou–Guiyang railway, part of the Shanghai–Kunming railway. It was built in 1972 and is under the jurisdiction of China Railway Guangzhou Group.

Preceding station	China Railway	Following station
Xupu towards Shanghai or Shanghai South	Shanghai–Kunming railway	Huaihua towards Kunming
