= Huitong railway station =

Railway station in Huaihua, Hunan, China

Coordinates: 26.8855°N 109.7279°E

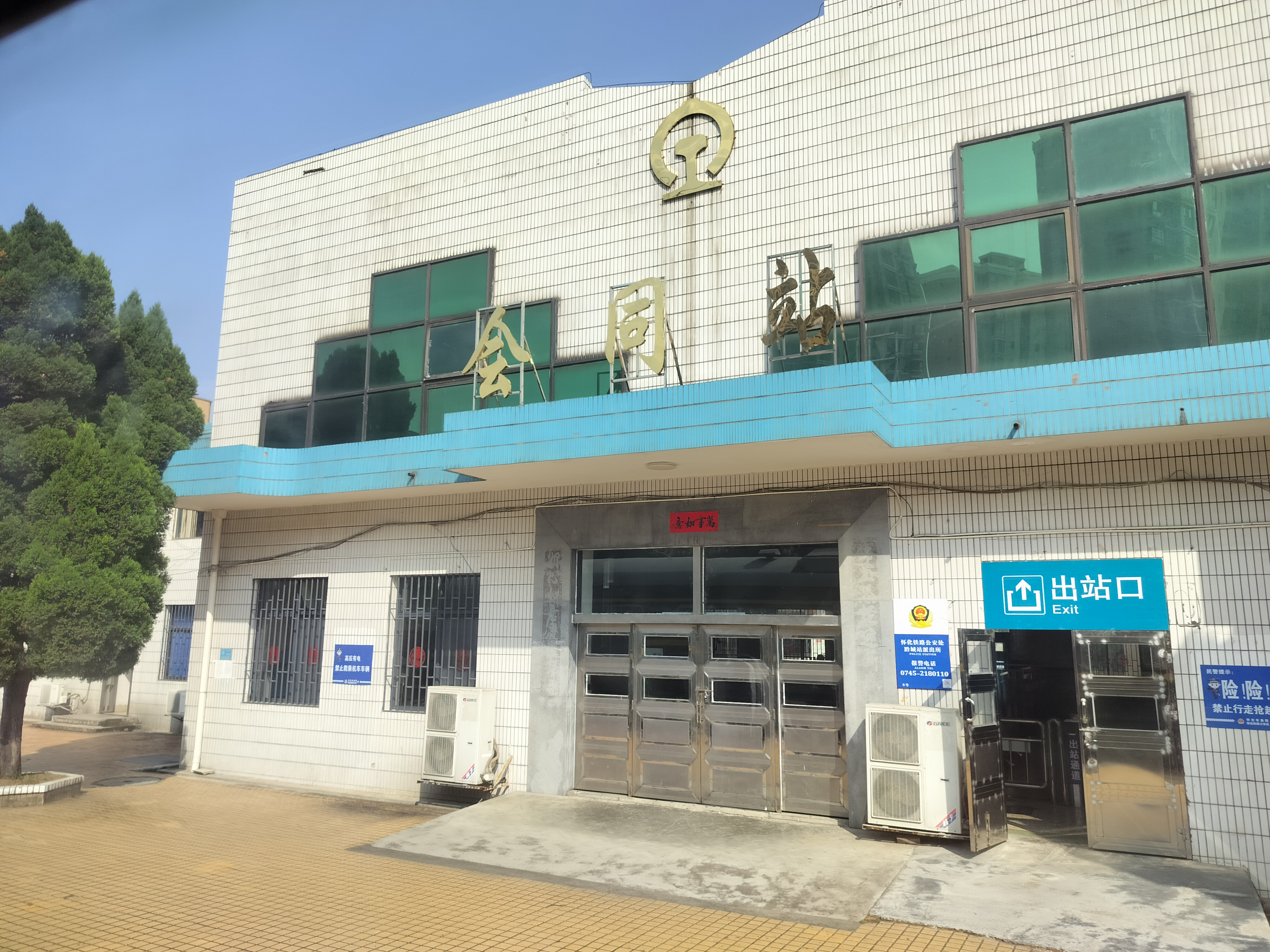
Huitong railway station

Huitong railway station is a fourth-class railway station in Huitong County, Huaihua, Hunan.

Preceding station	China Railway	Following station
Huaihua towards Jiaozuo	Jiaozuo–Liuzhou railway	Jingzhou (Hunan) towards Liuzhou
