= Qidong railway station (Hunan) =

Railway station in Hengyang, Hunan

Qidong 祁东

General information
- Location: Qidong County, Hengyang, Hunan; China
- Coordinates: 26.76°N 112.06°E
- Line: Hengyang–Liuzhou intercity railway
- Platforms: 2 side platforms

Other information
- Station code: TMIS code: 36004; Telegraph code: QWQ; Pinyin code: QDO

History
- Opened: 28 December 2013
Location
- Location within Hunan Location within China

Qidong railway station (Chinese: 祁东站) is a railway station in Qidong County, Hengyang, Hunan, China.

Initially, this station was called Qidong South. In January 2013, its name was changed to Qidong and the existing Qidong railway station was renamed Qidong North railway station. The station opened with the Hengyang–Liuzhou intercity railway on 28 December 2013.

Preceding station	China Railway High-speed	Following station
Hengyang East Terminus	Hengyang–Liuzhou intercity railway	Qiyang towards Liuzhou
