= Tangdukou Town =

Town in Hunan, China

Coordinates: 26°59′42″N 111°16′15″E

Tangdukou (Chinese: 塘渡口镇; pinyin: Tángdùkǒu Zhèn) is a town and the seat of Shaoyang County in Hunan, China. The town was established in 1953 and reorganized through the amalgamation of Huangtang Township (Chinese: 黄塘乡), Xiatangyun Township (Chinese: 霞塘云乡) and the former Tangdukou Town on November 24, 2015. It is located in the central Shaoyang County. The town is bordered by Xiaoxishi Township (Chinese: 黄荆乡) to the north, Jiugongqiao Township (Chinese: 九公桥镇), Huangjing Township (Chinese: 九公桥镇) and Xiahuaqiao Town (Chinese: 下花桥镇) to the east, Baicang Town to the south, and Jinchengshi Town (Chinese: 金称市镇) and Huangtingshi Town (Chinese: 黄亭市镇) to the west. The town has an area of 246.79 km^{2} (95.29 sq mi) with a population of 188,000 (as of 2015). The town was divided into 67 villages and 8 communities in 2015. Its seat is Shiwan Community (Chinese: 石湾社区).
