= Leiyang West railway station =

Railway station in Hunan, China

Leiyang West 耒阳西
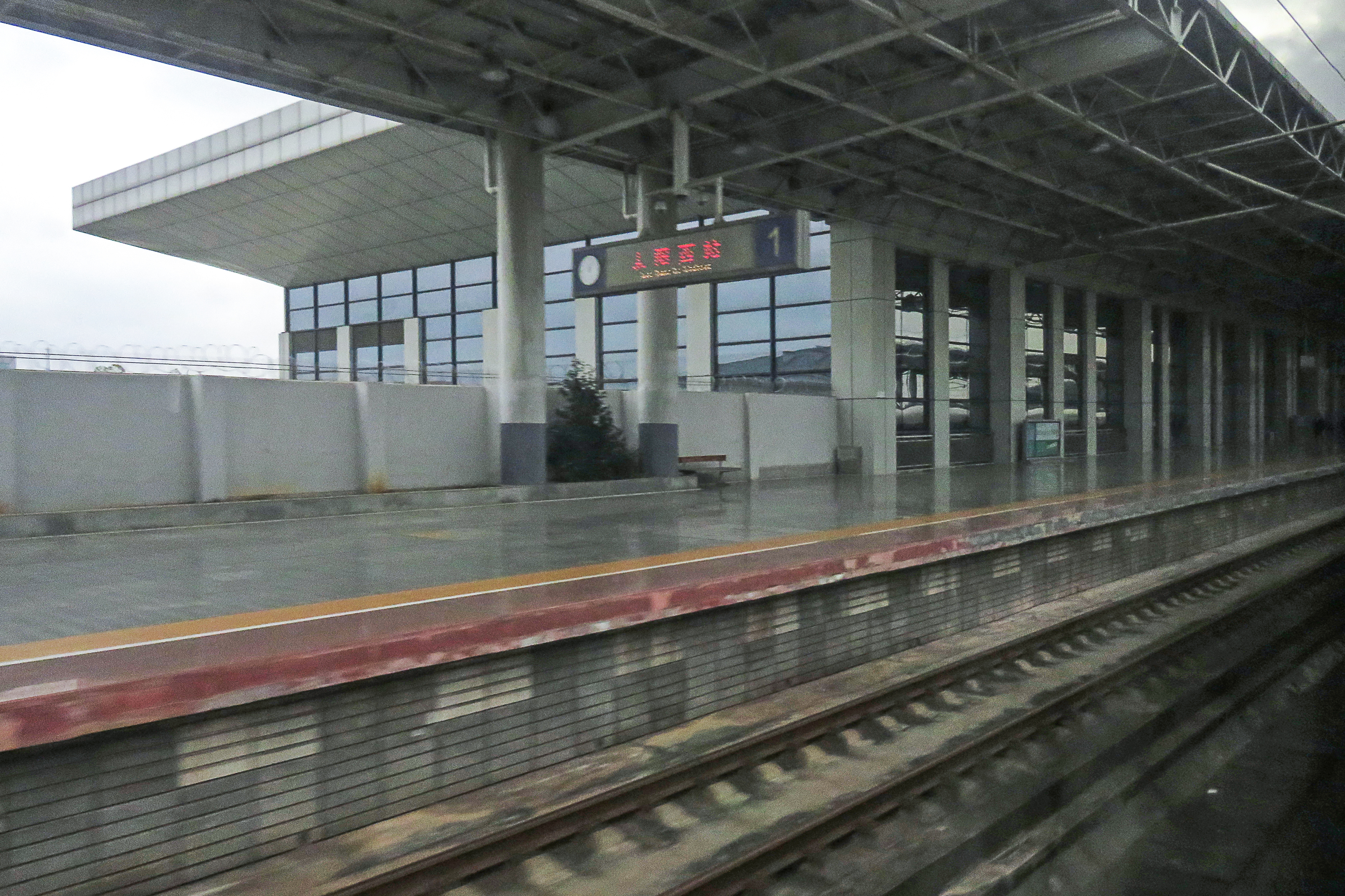
- Platform 1

General information
- Other names: Leiyangxi
- Location: Yuqing, Leiyang, Hengyang, Hunan; China
- Operated by: China Railway Guangzhou Group
- Line: Wuhan–Guangzhou High-Speed Railway

Other information
- Station code: TMIS code: 65830; Telegraph code: LPQ; Pinyin code: LYX

History
- Opened: 2009
Location

Leiyang West railway station (simplified Chinese: 耒阳西站; traditional Chinese: 耒陽西站; pinyin: Lěiyáng xī zhàn) is a railway station in Leiyang, Hengyang, Hunan, China. It is operated by China Railway Guangzhou Group on the Wuhan–Guangzhou High-Speed Railway. Construction of the station started in 2008, and the station was opened in 2009.

The station has two platforms and four tracks and occupies 6000 square meters.

== Destinations ==
Railway Administration	Destinations
CR Beijing	Beijing West, Shenzhen North
CR Guangzhou	Changsha South, Futian, Guangzhou South, Shanghai-Hongqiao, Shenzhen North, Wuhan, Xi'an North
CR Nanchang	Nanchang West, Shenzhen North
CR Shanghai	Guangzhou South
CR Wuhan	Guangzhou South, Shenzhen North, Wuhan, Yichang East
CR Zhengzhou	Zhengzhou East

Preceding station	China Railway High-speed	Following station
Hengyang East towards Wuhan	Wuhan–Guangzhou high-speed railway	Chenzhou West towards Guangzhou South
