= Tanjiang =

Tanjiang may refer to these places in China:

- Tanjiang, Guangdong (潭江), a town in Fengshun County, Guangdong
- Tanjiang Subdistrict (檀江街道), a subdistrict of Daxiang District, Shaoyang, Hunan
