= Beita, Shaoyang =

Beita 北塔区
- District
- Location in Hunan
- Coordinates: 27°14′44″N 111°27′07″E
- Country: China
- Province: Hunan
- Prefecture-level city: Shaoyang
- District seat: Zhuangyuanzhou Subdistrict

Area
  - Total: 84.25 km^{2} (32.53 sq mi)

Population (2020 census)
  - Total: 122,658
  - Density: 1,456/km^{2} (3,771/sq mi)
- Time zone: UTC+8 (China Standard)
- Postal code: 422000
- Website: www.beita.gov.cn

Beita District (simplified Chinese: 北塔区; traditional Chinese: 北塔區; pinyin: Běitǎ Qū) is one of three urban districts in Shaoyang City, Hunan province, China. The district is located in the northwest of the city proper and on the west shore of Zi River. It is bordered by Xinshao County to the north, Shuangqing and Daxiang Districts to the east, and Shaoyang County to the south and the southwest. Beita District covers an area of 84.4 km^{2} (32.6 sq mi), and as of 2015, it had a permanent resident population of 135,300. It is the 3rd smallest district by population (after Wulingyuan District and Nanyue District) in Hunan. The district has two subdistricts, two towns and a township under its jurisdiction. The government seat is Ziyuan Community (状元洲街道资源社区).

== Administrative divisions ==
Beita has 4 subdistricts and 1 township under its jurisdictions.

4 subdistricts

- Xintanzhen Subdistrict (新滩镇街道)
- Zhuangyuanzhou Subdistrict (状元洲街道)
- Tianjiang Subdistrict (田江街道)
- Chayuantou Subdistrict (茶园头街道)

1 township

- Chenjiaqiao Township (陈家桥乡)
