= Yichang–Changde high-speed railway =

Yichang–Changde high-speed railway simplified Chinese: 宜常高速铁路; traditional Chinese: 宜常高速鐵路; pinyin: Yí cháng gāosù tiělù

Overview
- Status: Under construction
- Owner: China Railway
- Locale: Chongqing, Hunan
- Termini: Yichang North; Changde
- Stations: 4

Service
- Operator(s): CR Wuhan Group, CR Guangzhou Group

Technical
- Line length: 185.741 km (115.414 mi)
- Num of tracks: 2
- Track gauge: 1,435 mm (4 ft 8 1/2 in)
- Minimum radius: 7,000 m (23,000 ft) (normal); 5,500 m (18,000 ft) (difficult)
- Electrification: 25 kV 50 Hz AC (overhead line)
- Operating speed: 350 kilometres per hour (220 mph) (design speed)
- Maximum incline: 2.0% (normal)

The Yichang–Changde high-speed railway or Yichang HSR (simplified Chinese: 宜常高速铁路; traditional Chinese: 宜常高速鐵路; pinyin: Yí cháng gāosù tiělù) is the Yichang–Changde section of the Hohhot–Nanning high-speed railway corridor. This project forms part of the eight north–south routes in China's "Eight Vertical and Eight Horizontal" network. The line starts from Yichang North station, passes through Yidu City and Songzi City in Hubei Province, enters Hunan Province from the south, passes through Li County and Linli County, and connects to Changde station of the Changde–Yiyang–Changsha high-speed railway. The newly built line is 185.741 km (115.414 mi)-long. There are 4 stations along the line: Yichang North, Lixian, Linli East, and Changde stations. The forecast construction period of the project is 4 years.

The project connects to the Yangtze River and Yichang–Xingshan high-speed railway in the north, and to the Qianjiang–Changde railway and Changde–Yiyang–Changsha high-speed railway in the south, forming part of the railway network structure in central China.

== History ==
The first public announcement of the environmental impact assessment and social stability risk assessment of the Yichang-Changde high-speed railway was made on 19 February 2025. The environmental impact report of the line was announced on 6 May.

On 26 December 2025, construction began on the Hunan section of the line.
