= Xinhuang railway station =

Railway station in Huaihua, Hunan

Xinhuang 新晃
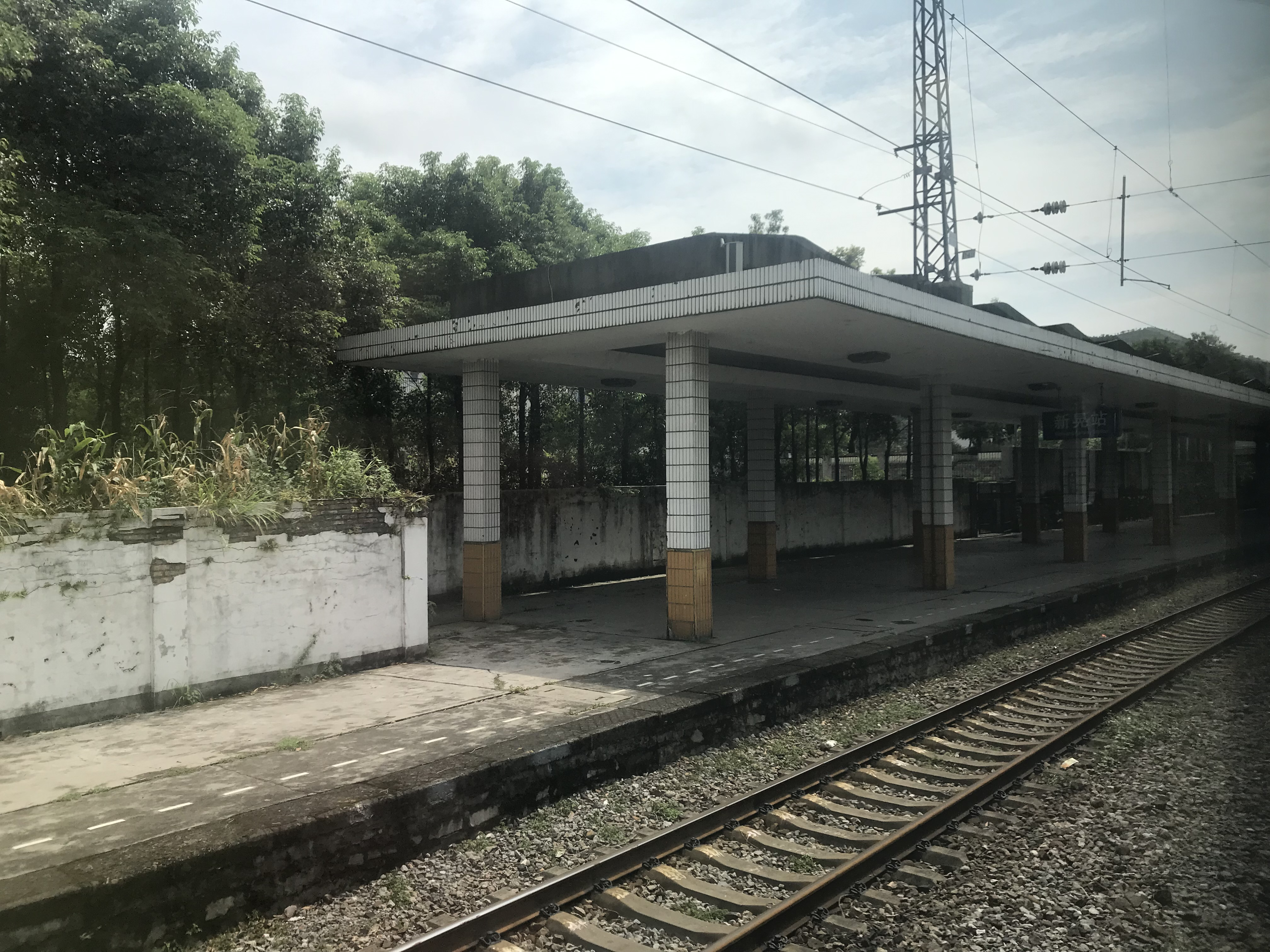

General information
- Location: Xinhuang Dong Autonomous County, Huaihua, Hunan; China
- Coordinates: 27°21′06″N 109°11′31″E
- Line: Shanghai–Kunming railway

History
- Opened: 1972
Location

Xinhuang railway station (Chinese: 新晃站) is a railway station in Xinhuang Dong Autonomous County, Huaihua, Hunan, China. It is an intermediate stop on the Hunan–Guizhou section of the Shanghai–Kunming railway. It opened in 1972 and is under China Railway Guangzhou Group.

Preceding station	China Railway	Following station
Huaihua towards Shanghai or Shanghai South	Shanghai–Kunming railway	Yuping towards Kunming
