= SYG =

SYG may refer to:

- Scottish Young Greens, youth wing of the Scottish Greens
- Set Your Goals, an American punk rock band from San Francisco, California, formed in 2004
- Swyddfa Ystadegau Gwladol, the Welsh name of the Office for National Statistics (ONS), the executive office of the UK Statistics Authority
- SYG, the IATA code for Shaoyang railway station, Hunan, China
