= Fenghuang Maglev =

Maglev line in Fenghuang, Hunan, China

Fenghuang Maglev is a medium-low speed maglev rapid transit line in Fenghuang County, Xiangxi Prefecture, Hunan province, China. The first phase officially started operation on 30 July 2022 and connects the Fenghuang Gucheng railway station on Zhangjiajie–Jishou–Huaihua high-speed railway with Fenghuangdengdai.

== Description ==
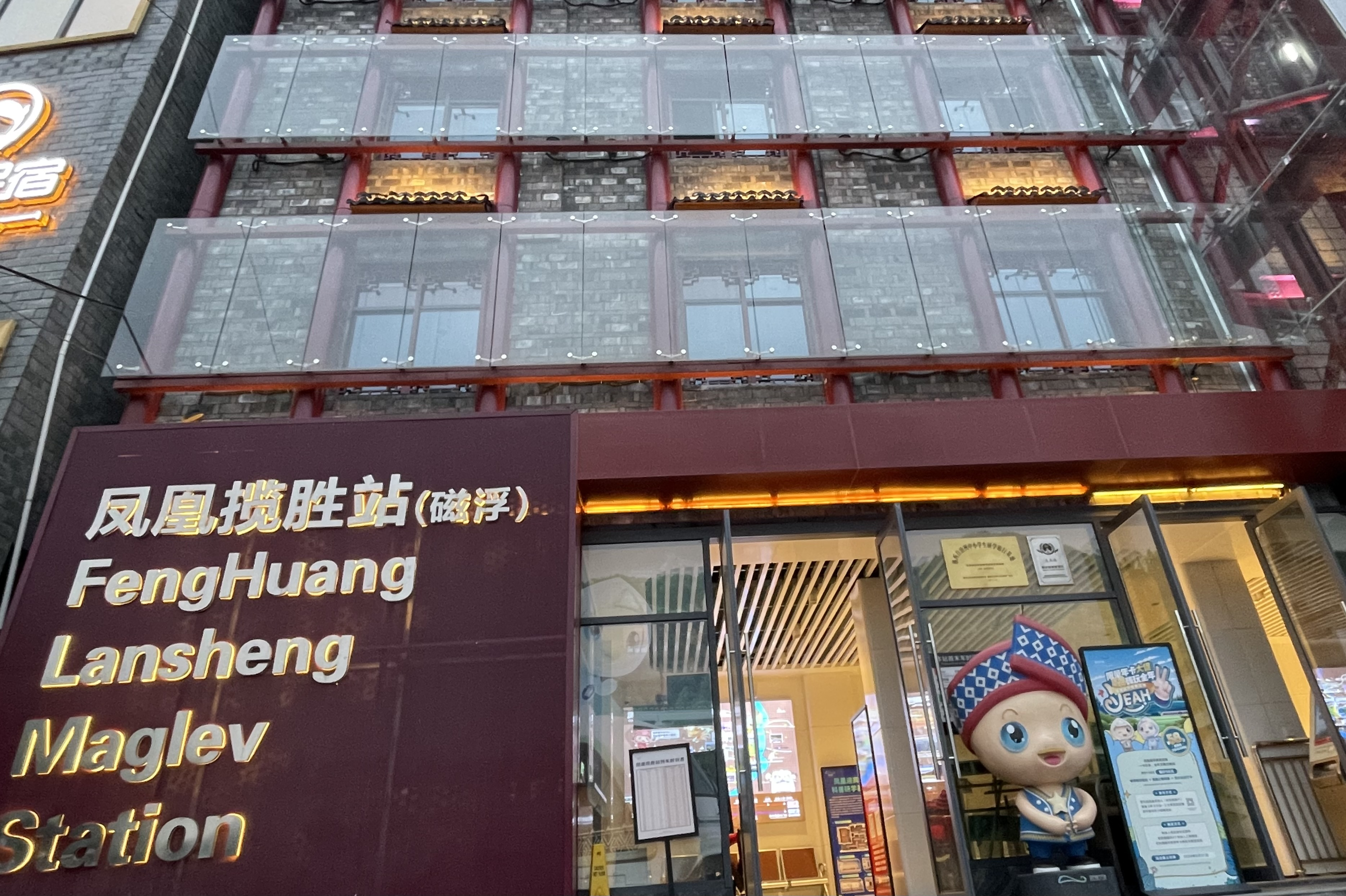
Fenghuang Lansheng Maglev Station

The line operates at speeds up to 100 km/h. The first phase is 9.12 km (5.67 mi) with 4 stations (and 2 more reserved stations). The ticket price is 58 yuan, allowing passengers to take unlimited times within four days. The operation time is from 9 a.m. to 9 p.m. (local time), with the 30-minute interval.

== Stations ==
Legend

- In operation
- Reserved stations, under planning

Station name		Connections	Distance km
English	Chinese	Connections	Distance km
Fenghuang Gucheng railway station	凤凰古城	Zhangjiajie-Jishou-Huaihua	
Shiwaitaoyuan	世外桃源		
Qiliangdong	奇梁洞		
Fenghuangyingbin	凤凰迎宾		
Fenghuanglansheng	凤凰揽胜		
Fenghuangdengdai	凤凰等待		

== History ==
On the afternoon of August 5, 2019, Wang Wuliang, Secretary of the Party committee and chairman of Hunan Rail Transit Group and chairman of Hunan Maglev Group, first went to the construction site of the project to express their sincere thanks for their hard work and efficient work, and visited the construction site of Fenghuang Maglev at Fenghuang high speed railway station, depot and Liwan tunnel.

In June 2021 it was reported that all the beam erection had been completed and 60% of the track laying was done.

Fenghuang Maglev officially opened on 30 July 2022.
