= Guangdonglu =

Guangdonglu 广东路街道
- Subdistrict
- Location within Hunan
- Coordinates: 26°53′16″N 112°37′52″E
- Country: People's Republic of China
- Province: Hunan
- Prefecture: Hengyang
- District: Zhuhui District
- Divisions: 7 communities

Area
  - Total: 1.7 km^{2} (0.66 sq mi)

Population (2015)
  - Total: 51,000
  - Density: 30,000/km^{2} (78,000/sq mi)
- Time zone: UTC+8 (China Standard)
- Area code: 0734
- Languages: Standard and Xiang Chinese

Guangdonglu Subdistrict (simplified Chinese: 广东路街道; traditional Chinese: 廣東路街道; pinyin: Guǎngdōnglù Jiēdào) is a subdistrict and the seat of Zhuhui District in Hengyang, Hunan, China. It has an area of about 1.7 km^{2} (0.66 sq mi) with a population of 51,000 (as of 2015). The subdistrict of Guangdonglu has seven communities under its jurisdiction, and its administration office is at No. 33 Guangxi Road (广西路33号).

== History ==
The subdistrict of Guangdonglu is historically the Hunanlu Subdistrict (湖南路街道) formed in March 1955 and changed to the current name in January 1982.

== Subdivisions ==
The subdistrict was divided into 11 communities of Guangdonglu, Guangxilu, Hunanlu, Hubeilu, Xiangjiangdonglu, Linjianglu, Anquanli, Kuihuali, Hengjili, Hehuaping and Hepingxiaoqu before 2015. Through the amalgamation in 2016, the communities was reduced to seven from 11.

- Hubeilu Community (湖北路社区)
- Guihuali Community (葵花里社区)
- Hehuaping Community (荷花坪社区)
- Heping Xiaoqu Community (和平小区社区)
- Linjiang Community (临江社区)
- Shangxi Community (上溪社区)
- Chezhanping Community (车站坪社区)
