= Zhangjiajie West railway station =

Railway station in Zhangjiajie, Hunan

Zhangjiajiexi 张家界西

General information
- Location: Yongding District, Zhangjiajie, Hunan; China
- Coordinates: 29.17086°N 110.45699°E
- Line(s): Qianjiang–Changde railway; Zhangjiajie–Jishou–Huaihua high-speed railway

Construction
- Accessible: Yes

History
- Opened: 26 December 2019
Location

Zhangjiajiexi (West) railway station (Chinese: 张家界西站) is a railway station in Yongding District, Zhangjiajie, Hunan, China. The station is an intermediate stop on the Qianjiang–Changde railway and the northern terminus of the Zhangjiajie–Jishou–Huaihua high-speed railway. It opened with the Qianjiang–Changde line on 26 December 2019.

The station has multiple large pieces of artwork inside.

Preceding station	China Railway High-speed	Following station
Sangzhi towards Qianjiang	Qianjiang–Changde railway	Niuchehe towards Changde
Terminus	Zhangjiajie–Jishou–Huaihua high-speed railway	Furongzhen towards Huaihua South
