= Zhuhui, Hengyang =

Zhuhui 珠晖区
- District
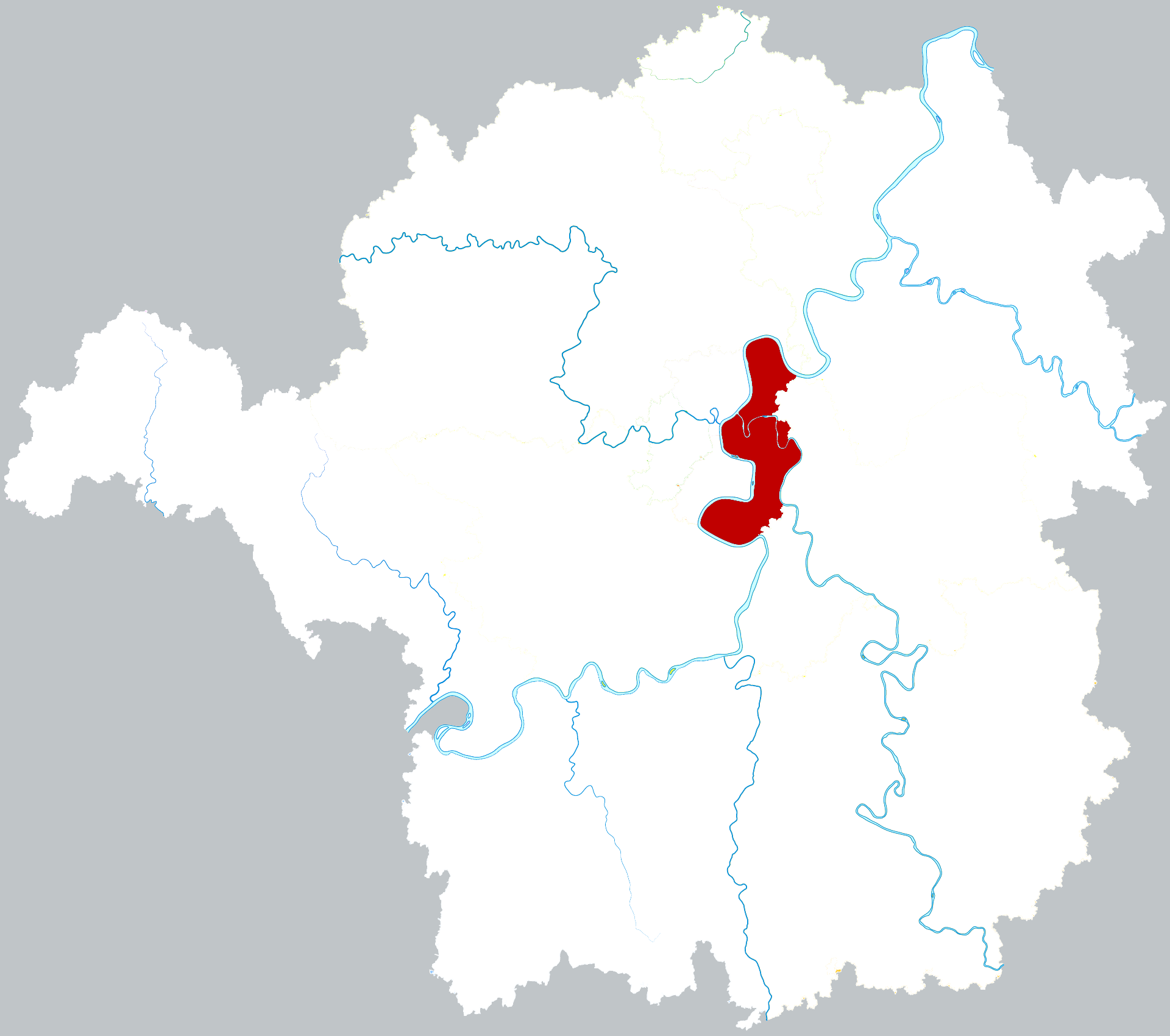
- Location in Hengyang

- Location in Hunan
- Coordinates: 26°53′41″N 112°37′12″E
- Country: People's Republic of China
- Province: Hunan
- Prefecture-level city: Hengyang
- Time zone: UTC+8 (China Standard)

Zhuhui District (simplified Chinese: 珠晖区; traditional Chinese: 珠暉區; pinyin: Zhūhuī Qū) is an urban district of Hengyang City, Hunan province, China. The district is located in the east of the city proper and on the east shore of Xiang River, it is bordered by Shigu District to the northwest, Yanfeng District to the southwest, Hengnan County to the southeast and the south, and Hengyang County to the northeast. Zhuhui District covers an area of 234.03 km^{2} (90.36 sq mi), and as of 2015, it had a permanent resident population of 344,400. The district has seven subdistricts, two townships and a town under its jurisdiction.

== Transport ==
Hengyang railway station, Hengyang North railway station and Hengyang East railway station are located here.

== Administrative divisions ==
6 towns

- Dongyangdu (东阳渡街道)
- Guangdonglu (广东路街道)
- Hengzhoulu (衡州路街道)
- Miaopu (苗圃街道)
- Yejin (冶金街道)
- Yuehan (粤汉街道)

1 town

- Chashan'ao (茶山坳镇)

2 townships

- Heping (和平乡)
- Linghu (酃湖乡)
