= Zhuangyuanzhou =

Subdistrict in Hunan, China

Coordinates: 27.2450049778°N 111.466365898°E

Zhuangyuanzhou (Chinese: 状元洲街道; pinyin: Chéngnán Jiēdào) is a subdistrict and the seat of Beita District in Shaoyang prefecture-level City, Hunan, China. The subdistrict has an area of 22.7 km^{2} (8.8 sq mi) with a population of 68,300 (as of 2015). It had 5 villages and 14 communities under its jurisdiction in 2015, and its seat is Xindu Community (Chinese: 新渡社区).
