= Jiaozuo–Pingdingshan high-speed railway =

Railway line in China

Overview
- Native name: 焦洛平高速铁路
- Status: Open
- Locale: Henan, China
- Termini: Jiaozuo West; Pingdingshan West
- Stations: 9

Service
- Type: High-speed rail
- System: China Railway
- Operator: CR Zhengzhou Group

Technical
- Line length: 230 km (140 mi)
- Track gauge: 1,435 mm (4 ft 8 1/2 in) standard gauge
- Electrification: 25 kV AC
- Signalling: Automatic block

The Jiaozuo–Pingdingshan high-speed railway, also known in Chinese as the Jiaoping Railway (Chinese: 焦平铁路; pinyin: Jiāo píng tiělù), is a high-speed railway under construction in China connecting Jiaozuo and Pingdingshan in Henan province. It is a component of the Huhhot-Nanning high-speed railway corridor. The Jiaozuo–Pingdingshan HSR is about 230 km (140 mi)-long and has a total investment of 40 billion yuan.
