= Zhangjiajie–Jishou–Huaihua high-speed railway =

High-speed railway line in China

Overview
- Native name: 张吉怀高速铁路
- Status: Operational
- Termini: Zhangjiajie West; Huaihua South
- Stations: 7

Service
- Type: Heavy rail

History
- Opened: 6 December 2021

Technical
- Line length: 246.9 km (153.4 mi)
- Track gauge: 1,435 mm (4 ft 8 1/2 in) standard gauge
- Electrification: 50 Hz 25,000 V
- Operating speed: 350 km/h (217 mph)

The Zhangjiajie–Jishou–Huaihua high-speed railway is a high-speed railway in China. It is 246.9 kilometres (153.4 mi) long and has a design speed of 350 kilometres per hour (220 mph). The line runs parallel to the Jiaozuo–Liuzhou railway, but on a faster alignment. It was opened on 6 December 2021.

== History ==
Construction began on 18 December 2016. It was opened on 6 December 2021.

== Stations ==
The line has the following stations:

- Zhangjiajie West
- Furongzhen
- Guzhang West
- Jishou East
- Fenghuanggucheng (interchange to Fenghuang Maglev)
- Mayang West
- Huaihua South
