= Qichezhan =

Coordinates: 27.2317629792°N 111.4947339882°E

Qichezhan (Chinese: 汽车站街道; pinyin: Qìchēzhàn Jiēdào) is a subdistrict and the seat of Shuangqing District in Shaoyang prefecture-level City, Hunan, China. It was one of six urban subdistricts. The subdistrict has an area of 4.5 km^{2} (1.7 sq mi) with a population of 43,183 (as of 2010 census). The subdistrict of Qichezhan has 6 communities under its jurisdiction.

== Subdivisions ==
- Baishouting Community (Chinese: 百寿亭社区)
- Dongta Community (Chinese: 东塔社区)
- Jianshelu Community (Chinese: 建设路社区)
- Maziwa Community (Chinese: 麻子洼社区)
- Sanyanjing Community (Chinese: 三眼井社区)
- Songhazipo Community (Chinese: 东砂子坡社区)
