= Huaihua railway station =

Railway station in Huaihua, China

Coordinates: 27.5607°N 109.9633°E

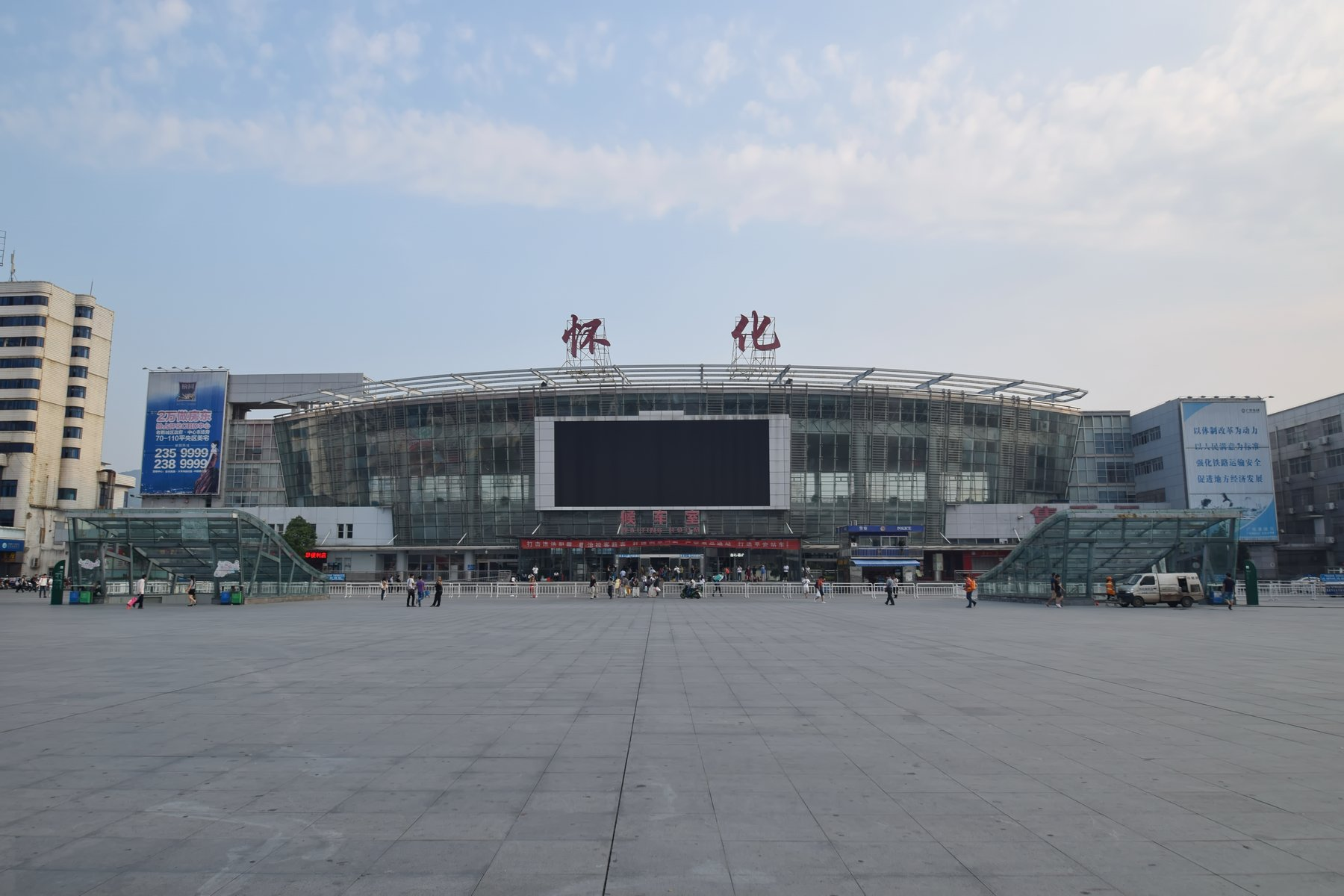

Huaihua railway station is a railway station in Huaihua built in 1972. It is on the Shanghai–Kunming railway, Jiaozuo–Liuzhou railway, and Chongqing–Huaihua railway.

== History ==
A new station building was opened on 15 January 2007.

== See also ==
- Huaihua South railway station

Preceding station	China Railway	Following station
Chenxi towards Shanghai or Shanghai South	Shanghai–Kunming railway	Xinhuang towards Kunming
Mayang towards Jiaozuo	Jiaozuo–Liuzhou railway	Huitong towards Liuzhou
Jinhe towards Chongqing North	Chongqing–Huaihua railway	Terminus
