= Shuangqing, Shaoyang =

Shuangqing 双清区
- District
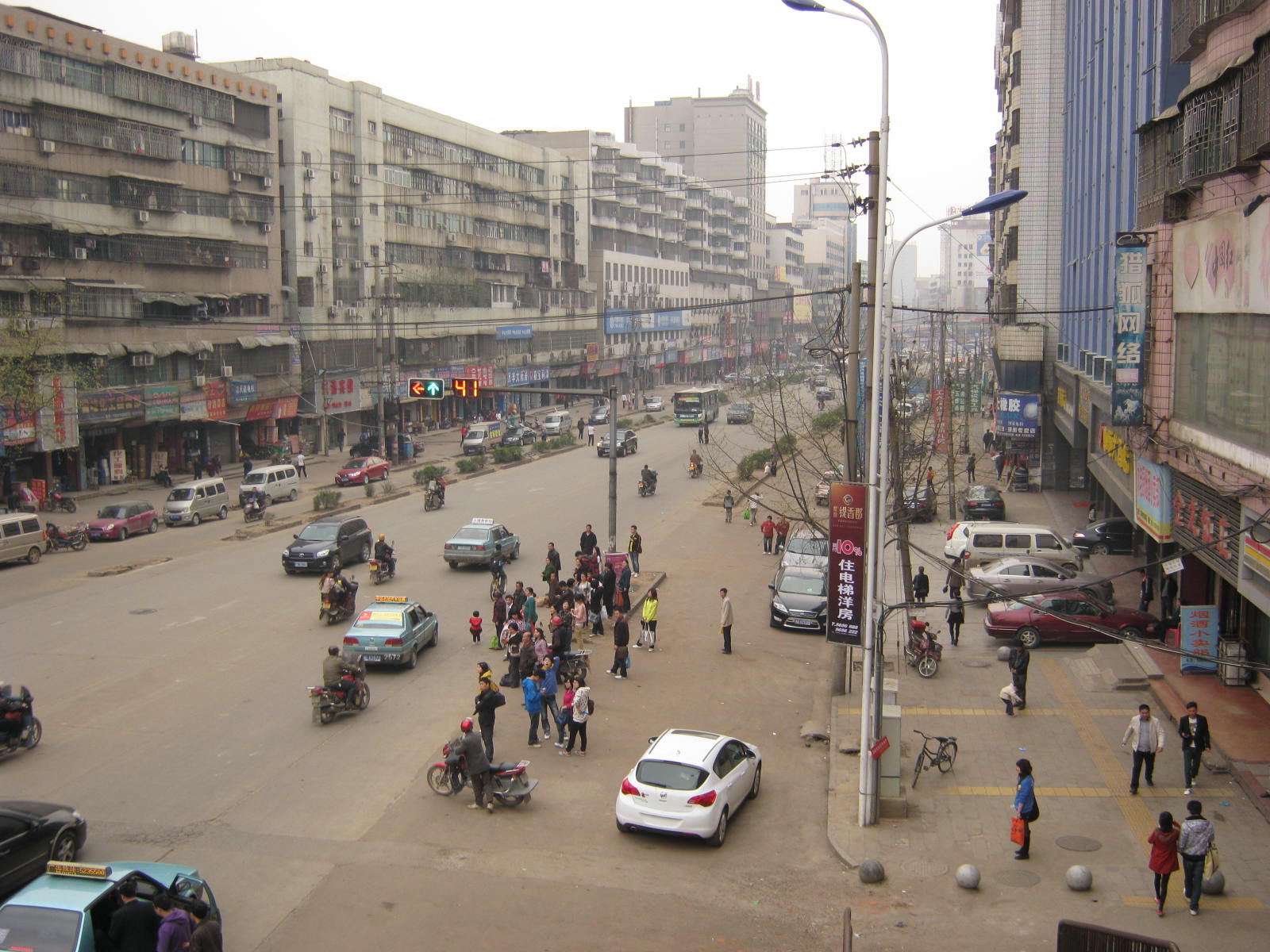

- Location in Hunan
- Coordinates (Shuangqing District government): 27°13′58″N 111°29′47″E
- Country: People's Republic of China
- Province: Hunan
- Prefecture-level city: Shaoyang
- Time zone: UTC+8 (China Standard)

Shuangqing District (simplified Chinese: 双清区; traditional Chinese: 雙清區; pinyin: Shuāngqīng Qū) is one of three urban districts in Shaoyang City, Hunan province, China. The district is located in the northeast of the city proper and on the east shore of Zi River, it is bordered by Xinshao County to the north, Shaodong County to the east, Daxiang District to the south, and Beita District to the west. Shuangqing District covers an area of 139.6 km^{2} (53.9 sq mi), and as of 2015, it had a permanent resident population of 315,000 and a registered population of 278,200. The district has six subdistricts, two townships and a town under its jurisdiction. The government seat is Dongfenglu Subdistrict (东风路街道).

== Administrative divisions ==
6 subdistricts

- Dongfenglu (东风路街道)
- Longxutang (龙须塘街道)
- Qiaotou (桥头街道)
- Qichezhan (汽车站街道)
- Xiaojianghu (小江湖街道)
- Xinglong (兴隆街道)

2 towns

- Dutouqiao (渡头桥镇)
- Gaochongshan (高崇山镇)

1 township

- Huochezhan (火车站乡)
