= Chengnan, Shaoyang =

Subdistrict of Daxiang District, Shaoyang, China

Coordinates: 27.2229192454°N 111.4537700345°E

Chennan Subdistrict (Chinese: 城南街道; pinyin: Chéngnán Jiēdào) is a subdistrict and the seat of Daxiang District in Shaoyang prefecture-level City, Hunan, China. The subdistrict has an area of 55.02 km^{2} (21.24 sq mi) with a population of 80,300 (as of 2015). It had 18 villages and 12 communities under its jurisdiction in 2015, and its seat is Mati Community (Chinese: 马蹄社区).
