= Tanjiang Subdistrict =

Tanjiang Subdistrict 檀江街道
- Subdistrict
- Location in Hunan
- Coordinates: 27°10′6″N 111°29′1″E
- Country: People's Republic of China
- Province: Hunan
- Prefecture-level city: Shaoyang
- District: Daxiang District
- Time zone: UTC+8 (China Standard)

Tanjiang Subdistrict (Chinese: 檀江街道; pinyin: Tánjiāng Jiēdào) is a subdistrict in Daxiang District, Shaoyang, Hunan, China. As of 2018, it has three residential communities and three villages under its administration.

== See also ==
- List of township-level divisions of Hunan
