= Diecai District =

Diecai 叠彩区 · Dezcaij Gih
- District
- Location in Guangxi
- Coordinates: 25°18′47″N 110°18′00″E
- Country: China
- Autonomous region: Guangxi
- Prefecture-level city: Guilin

Area
  - Total: 52 km^{2} (20 sq mi)
- Time zone: UTC+8 (China Standard)

Diecai District (simplified Chinese: 叠彩区; traditional Chinese: 疊彩區; pinyin: Diécǎi Qū; Zhuang language: Dezcaij Gih) is a district of the city of Guilin, Guangxi, China.

== Administrative divisions ==
There are 2 subdistricts and 1 township in Diecai District:

- Diecai Subdistrict (叠彩街道)
- Beimen Subdistrict (北门街道)
- Dahe Township (大河乡)
