= Shaoyang railway station =

Railway station in Shaoyang, China

Shaoyang 邵阳
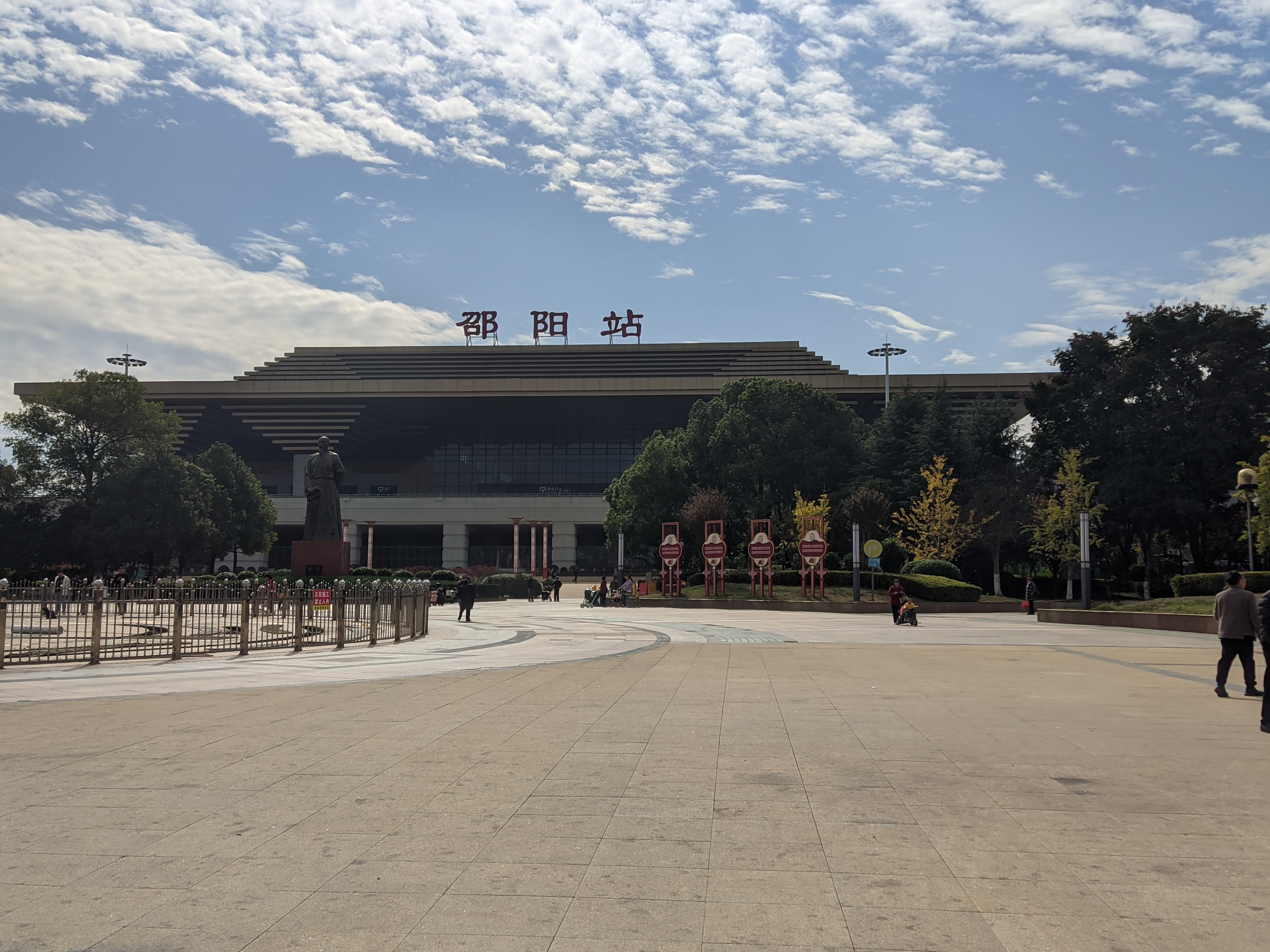

General information
- Location: Daxiang District, Shaoyang, Hunan; China
- Coordinates: 27°12′57″N 111°27′20″E
- Lines: Luoyang–Zhanjiang railway Huaihua–Shaoyang–Hengyang railway

Other information
- IATA code: SYG
Location

Shaoyang railway station (Chinese: 邵阳) is a railway station, located in the Daxiang District, Shaoyang, Hunan, People's Republic of China.

Shaoyang is also served by Shaoyang North railway station, though it is much further away from the urban area.

== History ==
In 2018, additional platforms were added. In 2020, a further expansion project was launched.

Preceding station	China Railway High-speed	Following station
Shaoyang West towards Huaihua South	Huaihua–Shaoyang–Hengyang railway	Shaodong towards Hengyang East
