= Huaihua–Shaoyang–Hengyang railway =

Railway line in China

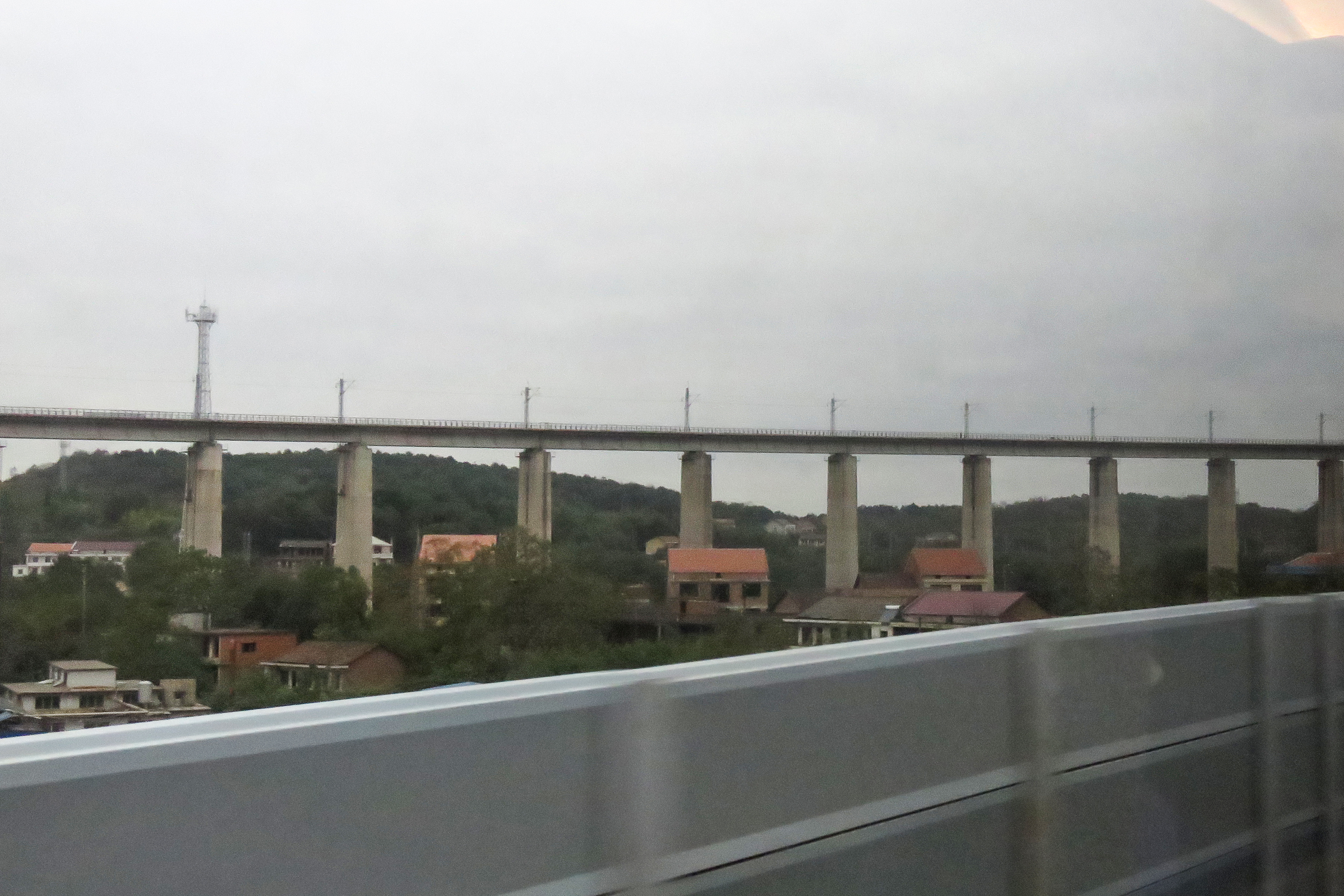
- Huaihua-Shaoyang-Hengyang Railway near Nonglin, Chashan'ao

Overview
- Status: Operating
- Termini: Huaihua South; Hengyang East

Service
- Operator(s): China Railway

History
- Opened: 26 December 2018

Technical
- Line length: 318 km (198 mi)
- Track gauge: 1,435 mm (4 ft 8 1/2 in)
- Operating speed: 200 km/h (124 mph)

The Huaihua–Shaoyang–Hengyang railway is a railway line in China.

== History ==
Construction started in 2014. The line opened on 26 December 2018.

== Operational Stations ==
Station Name	Chinese	China Railway transfers/connections
Huaihua South	怀化南	Shanghai–Kunming high-speed railway
Anjiang East	安江东	
Dongkou	洞口	
Longhui	隆回	
Shaoyang West	邵阳西	
Shaoyang	邵阳	Luoyang–Zhanjiang railway
Shaodong	邵东	Luoyang–Zhanjiang railway
Yangqiao	杨桥	
Xidu	西渡	
Hengyang East	衡阳东	Wuhan–Guangzhou high-speed railway Hengyang–Liuzhou intercity railway
