= Baicang =

Baicang 白仓镇
- Town
- Interactive map of Baicang
- Coordinates: 26°52′56″N 111°17′41″E
- Country: People's Republic of China
- Province: Hunan
- Prefecture-level city: Shaoyang
- County: Shaoyang
- Village-level divisions: 1 residential community 49 villages
- Elevation: 274 m (899 ft)
- Time zone: UTC+8 (China Standard)
- Area code: 0739

Baicang (simplified Chinese: 白仓; traditional Chinese: 白倉; pinyin: Báicāng) is a town in Shaoyang County, located in the eastern Hunan province of China about 12 kilometres (7.5 mi) south of the county seat. As of 2011, it has one residential community (居委会) and 49 villages under its administration.

== See also ==
- List of township-level divisions of Hunan
