= Loudi railway station =

Railway station in Loudi, China

Loudi railway station 娄底站
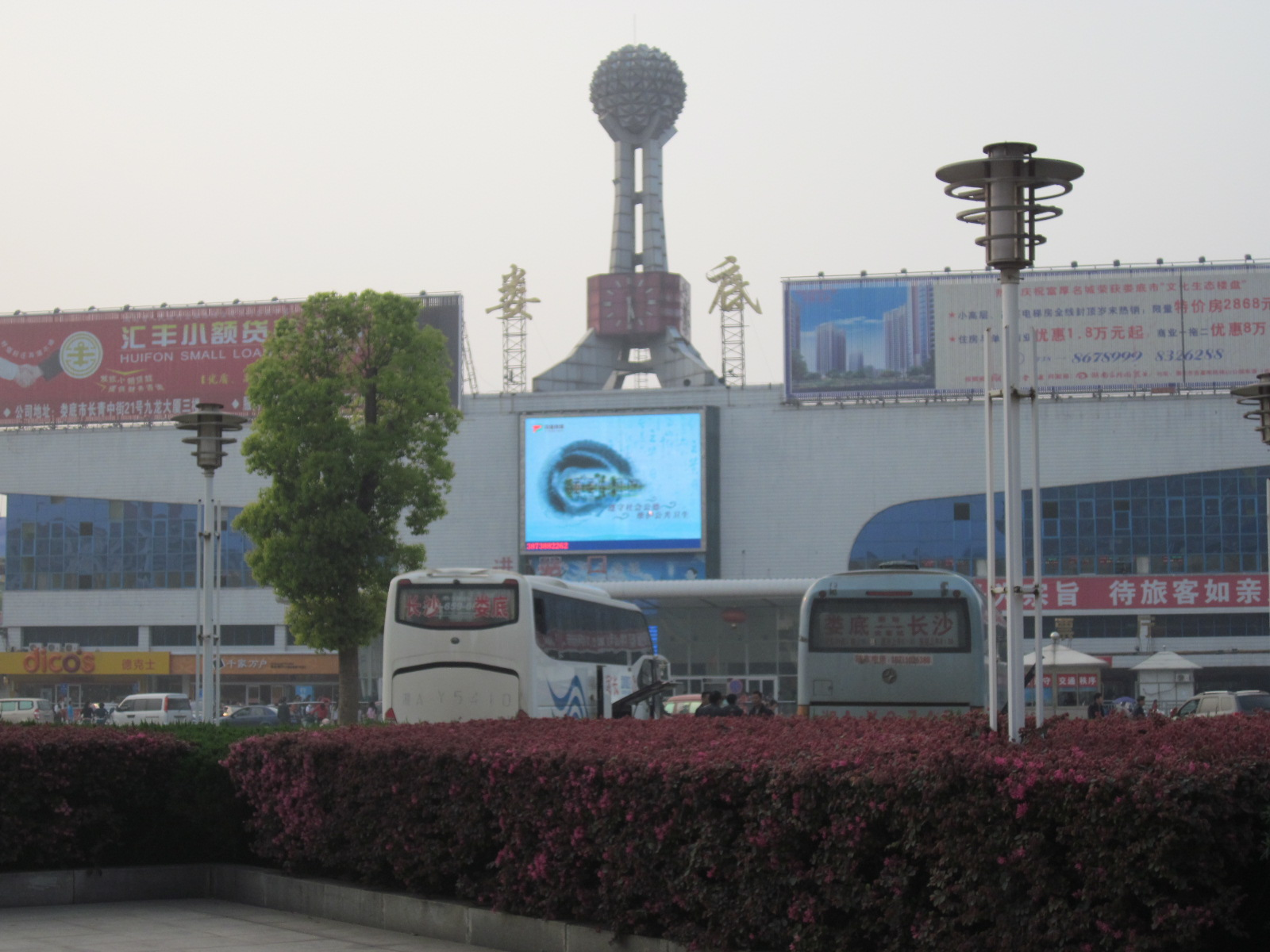
- Loudi Railway Station.

General information
- Location: Loudi, Hunan; China
- Coordinates: 27°44′43″N 112°00′47″E
- Operated by: China Railway
- Line(s): Shanghai–Kunming railway Yiyang–Zhanjiang railway

History
- Opened: 1958

Loudi railway station (simplified Chinese: 娄底站; traditional Chinese: 婁底站; pinyin: Lóudǐ Zhàn) is a railway station located in Loudi, Hunan, China, on the Shanghai–Kunming railway and Luoyang–Zhanjiang railway lines, which are operated by China Railway.

== History ==
The railway station opened in 1958.

A new station started to be built in November 1996, and was completed in January 1999.
