= China Railway Guangzhou Group =

Railway company based in Guangzhou, China

China Railway Guangzhou Group Co., Ltd.
- Company type: State-owned enterprise
- Industry: Railway operations
- Predecessor: Guangzhou Railway Administration (1953-1993); Guangzhou Railway Group (1993-2017)
- Founded: 19 November 2017
- Headquarters: 151 Zhongshan 1st Road, Yuexiu, Guangzhou, Guangdong, China
- Area served: Guangdong; Hunan; Hainan
- Owner: China Railway
- Parent: China Railway
- Website: Official Website

China Railway Guangzhou Group
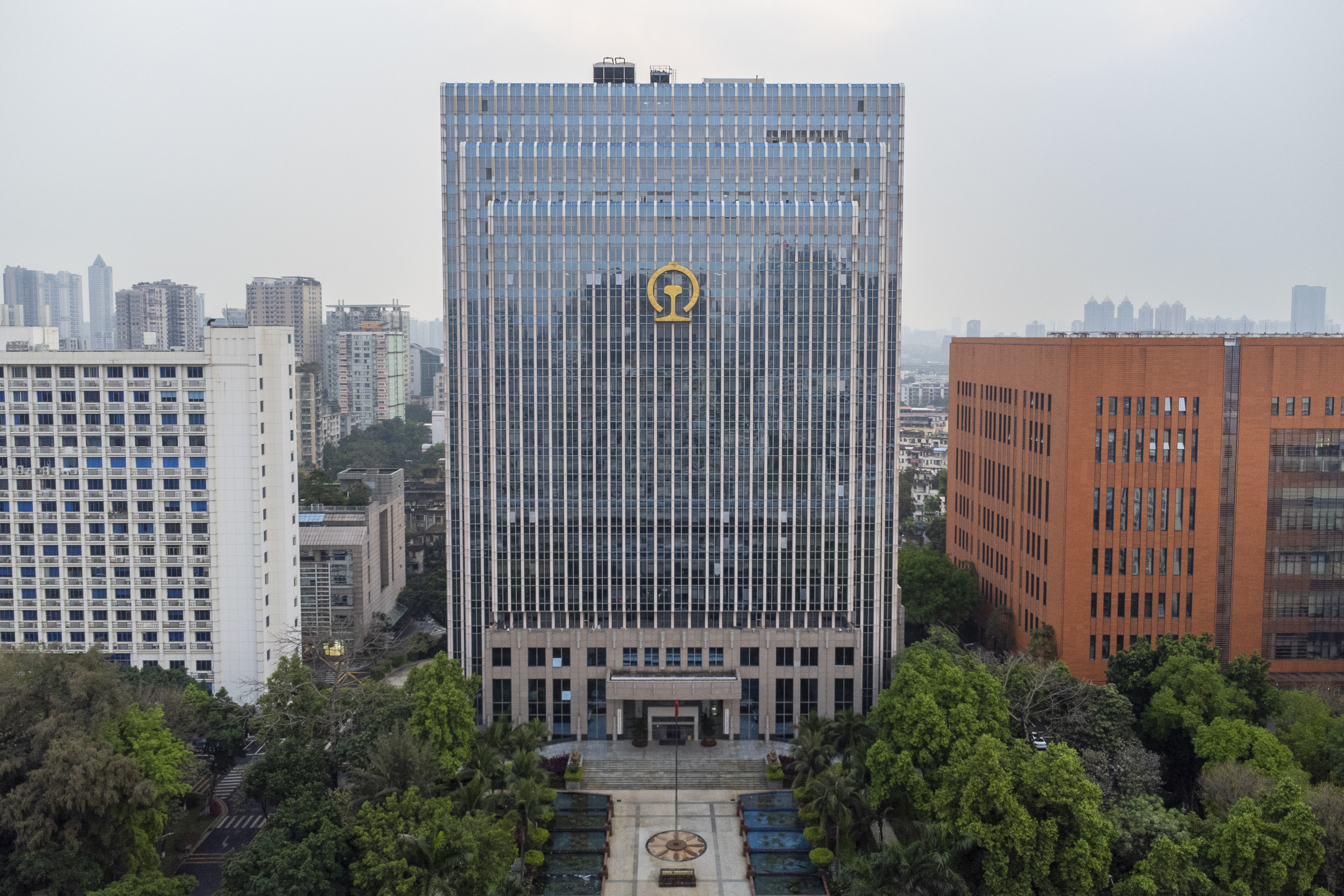
- Headquarter of CR Guangzhou
- Simplified Chinese: 中国铁路广州局集团
- Traditional Chinese: 中國鐵路廣州局集團
Transcriptions
Standard Mandarin
- Hanyu Pinyin: Zhōngguó Tiělù Guǎngzhōu Jú Jítuán

Guangzhou Railway Group
- Simplified Chinese: 广铁集团
- Traditional Chinese: 廣鐵集團
Transcriptions
Standard Mandarin
- Hanyu Pinyin: Guǎngtiě Jítuán

Guangzhou Railway Administration
- Simplified Chinese: 广州铁路局
- Traditional Chinese: 廣州鐵路局
Transcriptions
Standard Mandarin
- Hanyu Pinyin: Guǎngzhōu Tiělù Jú

CR Guangzhou
- Simplified Chinese: 广铁
- Traditional Chinese: 廣鐵
Transcriptions
Standard Mandarin
- Hanyu Pinyin: Guǎngtiě

China Railway Guangzhou Group, officially abbreviated as CR Guangzhou or CR-Guangzhou, formerly, Guangzhou Railway (Group) Corporation from 1993 to 2017 and Guangzhou Railway Administration from 1953 to 1993, is a subsidiary company operating under the umbrella of the China Railway Group (formerly the Ministry of Railway). It is responsible for the railway network within Guangdong, Hunan, and Hainan provinces.

Guangzhou Railway is the largest shareholder (37.12%) of Guangshen Railway, the operator of Guangzhou–Shenzhen Railway.

Guangzhou Railway is a subsidiary of China Railway. Both companies were incorporated under the Law on Industrial Enterprises, instead of newer Company Law of China.

== Equity investments ==
As of 31 December 2015

- Guangdong Pearl River Delta Intercity Railway (34.62%)

== Hub stations ==
- Guangzhou
  - Guangzhou, Guangzhou South, Guangzhou East, Guangzhou Baiyun, Qingsheng, Nansha (U/C)
- Shenzhen
  - Shenzhen, Shenzhen North, Futian, Shenzhen East
- Foshan
  - Foshan West
- Changsha
  - Changsha, Changsha South
- Zhuzhou
  - Zhuzhou, Zhuzhou West
- Hengyang
  - Hengyang, Hengyang East
- Huaihua
  - Huaihua, Huaihua South
- Yongzhou
  - Yongzhou

== Regional services ==
=== S-train services ===
- Haikou Suburban Railway

=== C-train services ===
- Pearl River Delta Metropolitan Region intercity railway
  - Guangzhu
  - Zhuji
  - Guangfozhao
  - Guanhui
  - Guangshen
  - Suishen
  - Xiashen
- Hunan Province
  - Changyichang
  - Changzhutan
