= Shaoyang County =

Shaoyang 邵阳县
- County
- Location in Hunan
- Coordinates (Shaoyang County government): 26°59′26″N 111°16′26″E
- Country: People's Republic of China
- Province: Hunan
- Prefecture-level city: Shaoyang
- Time zone: UTC+8 (China Standard)

Shaoyang County (simplified Chinese: 邵阳县; traditional Chinese: 邵陽縣; pinyin: Shàoyáng Xiàn) is a county under the administration of Shaoyang City in Hunan province, China. Located in the southwest of the province, the county is bordered to the north by Dongkou County, to the west by Huitong and Jingzhou Counties, to the southwest by Tongdao County, to the southeast by Chengbu County, and to the east by Wugang City. Shaoyang County covers an area of 1,996.08 km^{2} (770.69 sq mi), and as of 2015, it had a registered population of 1,048,235 and a permanent resident population of 957,800. The county has 12 towns and eight townships under its jurisdiction, and the county seat is Fenghuang Community (渡口镇凤凰社区).

== Administrative divisions ==
12 towns

- Baicang (白仓镇)
- Changyangpu (长阳铺镇)
- Guzhou (谷洲镇)
- Huangtingshi (黄亭市镇)
- Jinchengshi (金称市镇)
- Jiugongqiao (九公桥镇)
- Lijiaping (郦家坪镇)
- Tangdukou (塘渡口镇)
- Tangtianshi (塘田市镇)
- Wufengpu (五峰铺镇)
- Xiahuaqiao (下花桥镇)
- Yankoupu (岩口铺镇)

8 townships

- Caijiaqiao (蔡桥乡)
- Changle (长乐乡)
- Hebo (河伯乡)
- Huangjing (黄荆乡)
- Jinjiang (金江乡)
- Luocheng (罗城乡)
- Xiaoxishi (小溪市乡)
- Zhujiating (诸甲亭乡)

== Climate ==
Climate data for Shaoyang County, elevation 283 m (928 ft), (1991–2020 normals, extremes 1991–present)
| Month | Jan | Feb | Mar | Apr | May | Jun | Jul | Aug | Sep | Oct | Nov | Dec | Year |
|---|---|---|---|---|---|---|---|---|---|---|---|---|---|
| Record high °C (°F) | 27.3 (81.1) | 30.9 (87.6) | 32.7 (90.9) | 35.4 (95.7) | 36.0 (96.8) | 36.7 (98.1) | 39.0 (102.2) | 40.2 (104.4) | 37.7 (99.9) | 36.5 (97.7) | 31.5 (88.7) | 23.5 (74.3) | 40.2 (104.4) |
| Mean daily maximum °C (°F) | 9.1 (48.4) | 11.8 (53.2) | 16.1 (61.0) | 22.7 (72.9) | 26.9 (80.4) | 29.8 (85.6) | 33.0 (91.4) | 32.6 (90.7) | 28.8 (83.8) | 23.4 (74.1) | 17.9 (64.2) | 11.8 (53.2) | 22.0 (71.6) |
| Daily mean °C (°F) | 5.3 (41.5) | 7.6 (45.7) | 11.5 (52.7) | 17.5 (63.5) | 21.9 (71.4) | 25.3 (77.5) | 28.0 (82.4) | 27.2 (81.0) | 23.5 (74.3) | 18.2 (64.8) | 12.7 (54.9) | 7.3 (45.1) | 17.2 (62.9) |
| Mean daily minimum °C (°F) | 2.7 (36.9) | 4.8 (40.6) | 8.4 (47.1) | 13.9 (57.0) | 18.2 (64.8) | 22.0 (71.6) | 24.0 (75.2) | 23.5 (74.3) | 19.9 (67.8) | 14.7 (58.5) | 9.2 (48.6) | 4.2 (39.6) | 13.8 (56.8) |
| Record low °C (°F) | −6.4 (20.5) | −5.4 (22.3) | −1.7 (28.9) | 2.2 (36.0) | 8.1 (46.6) | 15.0 (59.0) | 18.1 (64.6) | 16.0 (60.8) | 11.9 (53.4) | 3.4 (38.1) | −1.2 (29.8) | −7.0 (19.4) | −7.0 (19.4) |
| Average precipitation mm (inches) | 66.2 (2.61) | 70.6 (2.78) | 128.0 (5.04) | 138.3 (5.44) | 183.1 (7.21) | 175.8 (6.92) | 129.6 (5.10) | 117.4 (4.62) | 60.1 (2.37) | 74.6 (2.94) | 71.0 (2.80) | 52.9 (2.08) | 1,267.6 (49.91) |
| Average precipitation days (≥ 0.1 mm) | 15.0 | 14.8 | 18.5 | 16.9 | 16.6 | 16.0 | 10.9 | 11.9 | 9.0 | 10.6 | 11.5 | 12.0 | 163.7 |
| Average snowy days | 4.0 | 2.3 | 0.6 | 0 | 0 | 0 | 0 | 0 | 0 | 0 | 0 | 1.3 | 8.2 |
| Average relative humidity (%) | 82 | 82 | 84 | 82 | 82 | 84 | 78 | 79 | 80 | 80 | 80 | 79 | 81 |
| Mean monthly sunshine hours | 57.7 | 54.6 | 71.7 | 103.3 | 128.0 | 132.8 | 222.9 | 194.8 | 143.0 | 122.8 | 109.3 | 89.8 | 1,430.7 |
| Percentage possible sunshine | 17 | 17 | 19 | 27 | 31 | 32 | 53 | 48 | 39 | 35 | 34 | 28 | 32 |
Source: China Meteorological Administration

== Transportation ==
Shaoyang West railway station on the Huaihua–Shaoyang–Hengyang railway is located here.
