= Guilin West railway station =

Railway station in Guilin, China

Guilinxi 桂林西
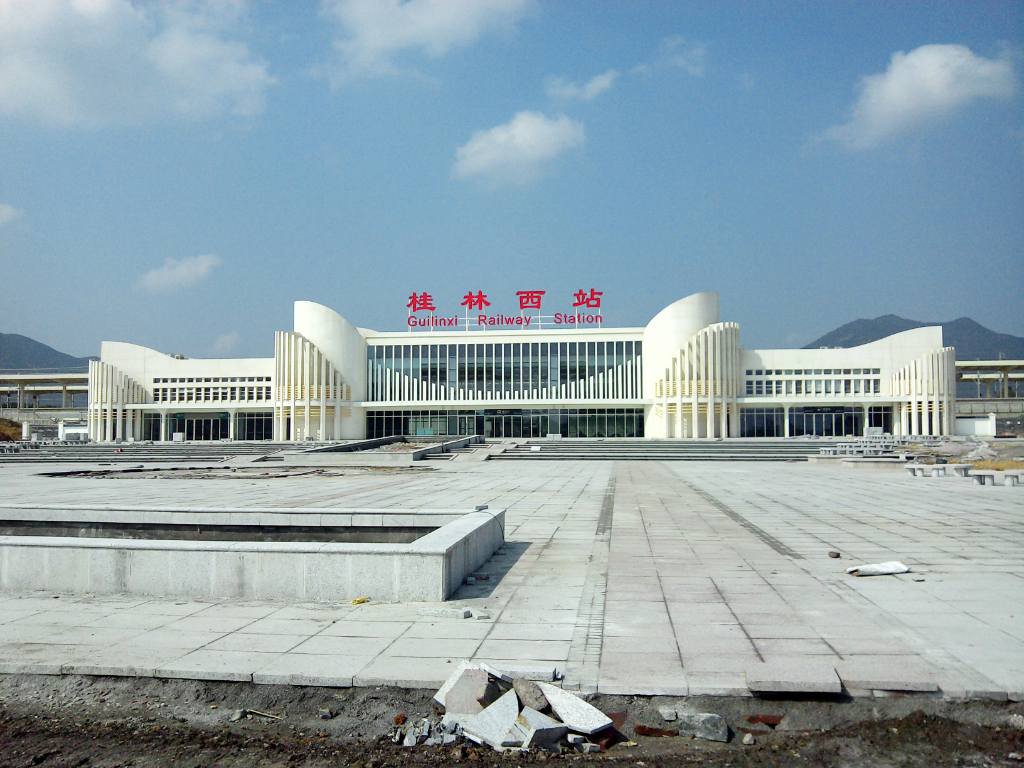

Chinese name
- Traditional Chinese: 桂林西站
- Simplified Chinese: 桂林西站
Transcriptions
Standard Mandarin
- Hanyu Pinyin: Guì lín xī Zhàn

General information
- Other names: Guilin West
- Location: China
- Coordinates: 25°21′29″N 110°15′44″E
- Operated by: China Railway Corporation
- Line: Guiyang–Guangzhou high-speed railway
Location

Guilin West railway station (Chinese: 桂林西站; pinyin: Guìlínxī Zhàn), serves the city of Guilin, in Guangxi. It is a stop on the Guiyang–Guangzhou high-speed railway.

== Services ==
Guilin West railway station is located in the north-north-western periphery of Guilin and primarily served by services passing between Guiyang and Guangzhou on the Guiyang–Guangzhou high-speed railway, enabling a long detour through central Guilin to be avoided.

| Preceding station | China Railway High-speed | Following station |
|---|---|---|
| Wutong towards Guiyang North | Guiyang–Guangzhou high-speed railway | Yangshuo towards Guangzhou South |
