= Huaihua South railway station =

Railway station in Huaihua, China

Coordinates: 27.5153°N 109.9886°E

Huaihua South 怀化南
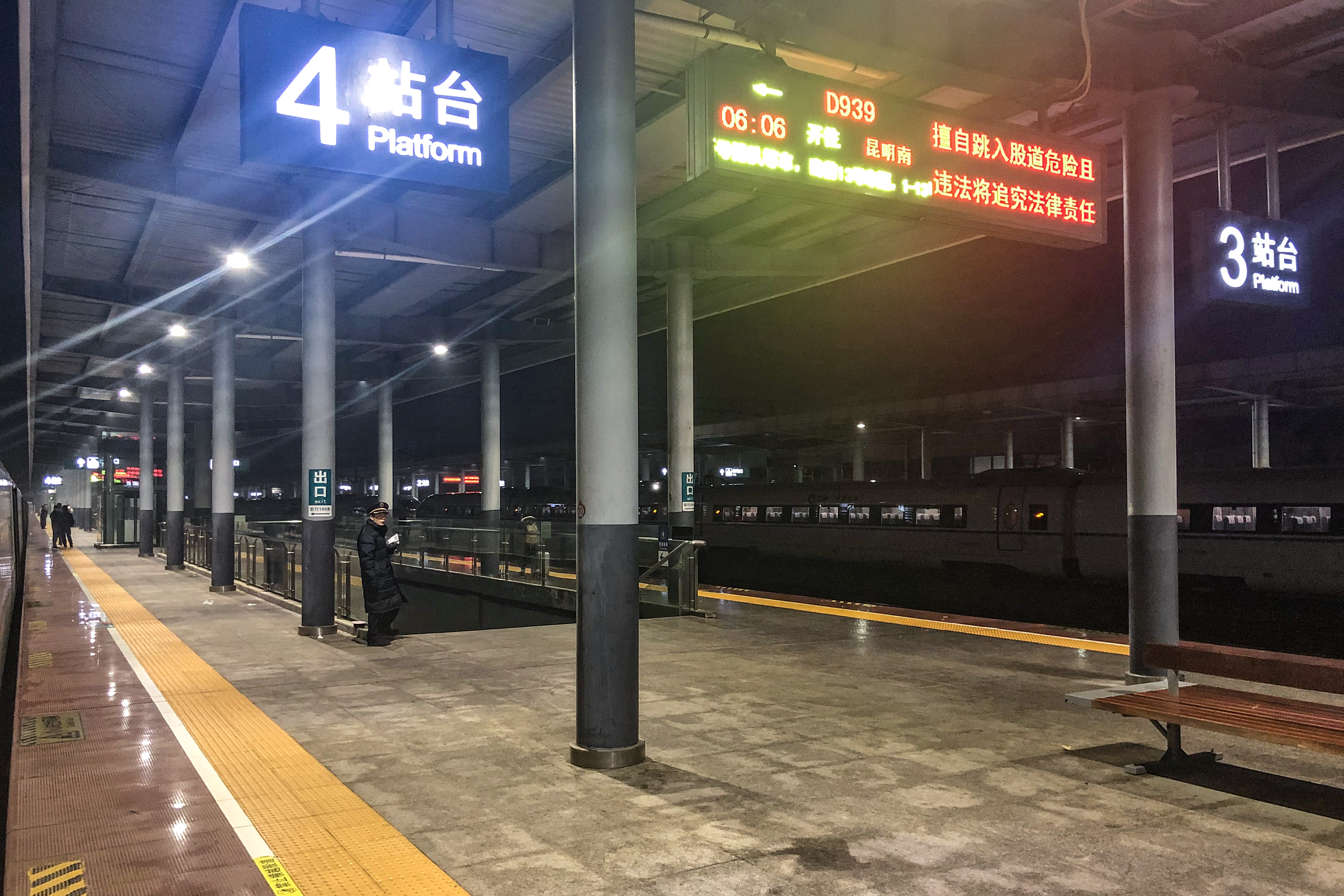

General information
- Location: Hecheng District, Huaihua, Hunan; China
- Line(s): Shanghai–Kunming high-speed railway; Huaihua–Shaoyang–Hengyang railway; Zhangjiajie–Jishou–Huaihua high-speed railway

History
- Opened: 16 December 2014

Huaihua South railway station is a railway station of Shanghai–Kunming high-speed railway and Huaihua–Shaoyang–Hengyang railway located in Hunan, People's Republic of China. It is also the southern terminus of the Zhangjiajie–Jishou–Huaihua high-speed railway.

== History ==
The station opened with the Changsha–Kunming section of the Shanghai–Kunming high-speed railway on 16 December 2014.

== See also ==
- Huaihua railway station

| Preceding station | China Railway High-speed | Following station |
|---|---|---|
| Xupu South towards Shanghai Hongqiao | Shanghai–Kunming high-speed railway | Zhijiang towards Kunming South |
| Terminus | Huaihua–Shaoyang–Hengyang railway | Anjiang East towards Hengyang East |
| Mayang West towards Zhangjiajie West | Zhangjiajie–Jishou–Huaihua high-speed railway | Terminus |
