= Hengyang railway station =

Railway station in Hengyang, Hunan

Hengyang 衡阳
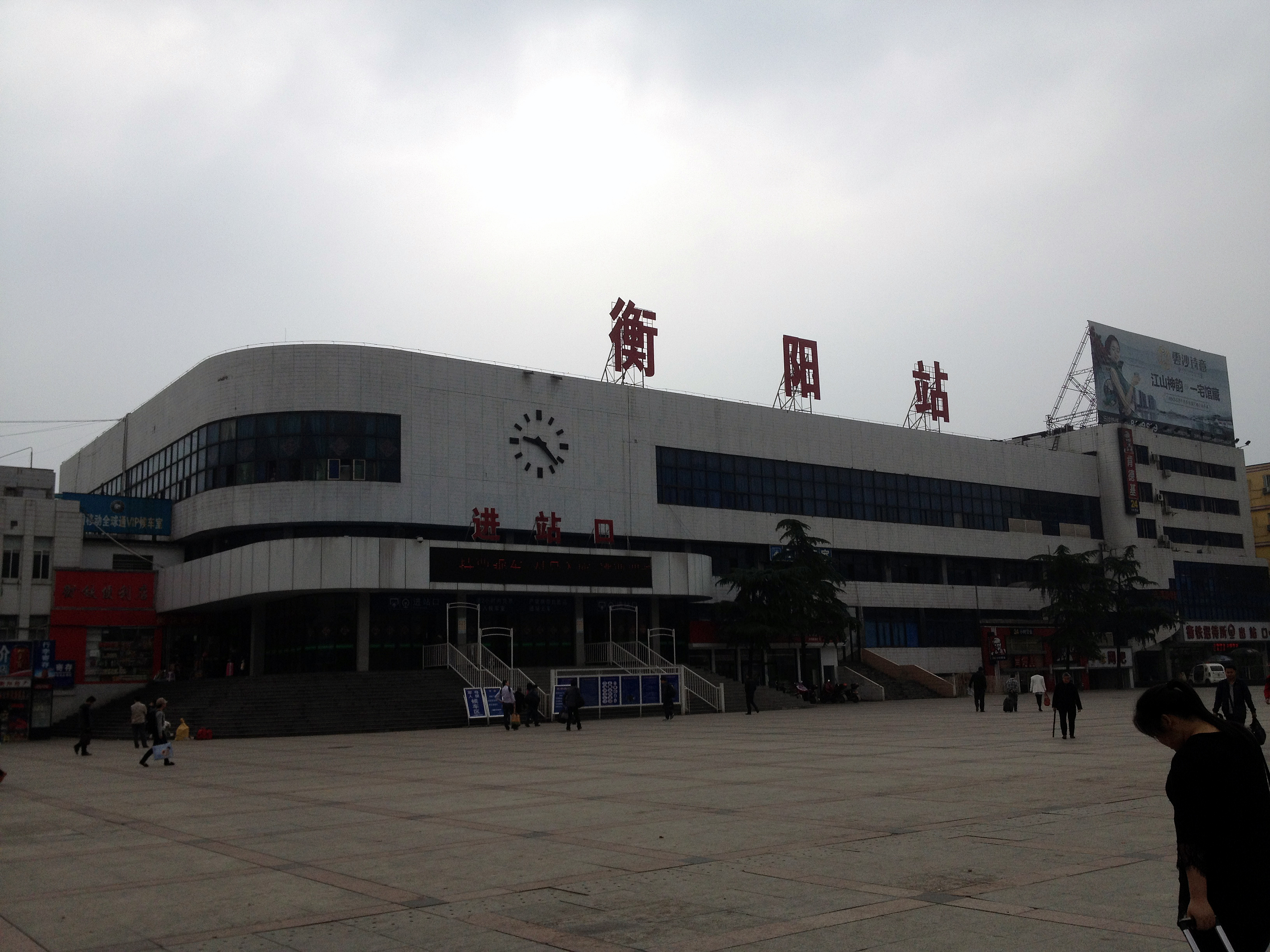

General information
- Location: Zhuhui District, Hengyang, Hunan; China
- Coordinates: 26°53′33.93″N 112°37′37.69″E
- Lines: Beijing–Guangzhou railway; Hunan–Guangxi railway; Ji'an–Hengyang railway

History
- Opened: 12 December 2000

Services
| Preceding station | China Railway | Following station |
|---|---|---|
| Hengshan (Hunan) towards Beijing or Beijing West | Beijing–Guangzhou railway | Leiyang towards Guangzhou |
| Terminus | Hunan–Guangxi railway | Yongzhou towards Pingxiang |
| Changsha towards Beijing West | Beijing–Nanning–Hanoi | Yongzhou towards Gia Lâm |
Location

Hengyang railway station (Chinese: 衡阳站) is a railway station in Zhuhui District, Hengyang, Hunan, China.

== History ==
The station was built with the Guangzhou–Hankou railway, now part of the Beijing–Guangzhou railway.

On 1 September 2017, a renovation project was started. It saw lifts and escalators installed and platform heights increased. The project was completed on 29 June 2018.

== Future ==
There are proposals to close the station and surrounding lines and transfer passenger services to Hengyang East.
