= Hengyang East railway station =

Railway station in Hunan, China

Coordinates: 26°54′1.75″N 112°42′20.96″E

Hengyang East 衡阳东
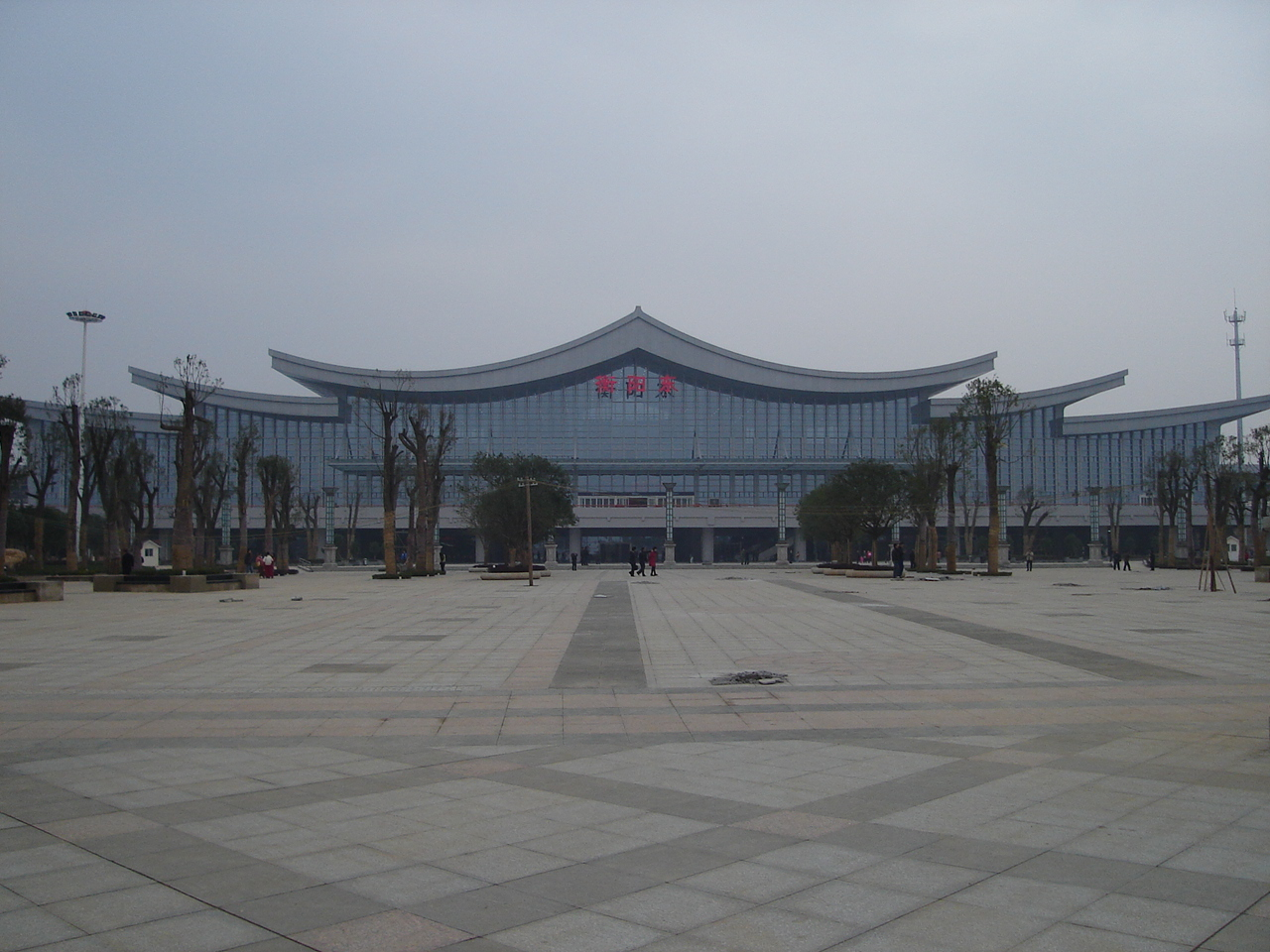
- Front view of the Hengyang East railway station

General information
- Other names: Hengyangdong
- Location: Linghu, Zhuhui District, Hengyang, Hunan; China
- Operated by: China Railway Guangzhou Group
- Lines: Wuhan–Guangzhou high-speed railway Hengyang–Liuzhou intercity railway Huaihua–Hengyang railway
- Tracks: 11

Other information
- Station code: TMIS code: 65827; Telegraph code: HVQ; Pinyin code: HYD

History
- Opened: 2009

Services
Preceding station	China Railway High-speed	Following station
Terminus	Hengyang–Liuzhou intercity railway	Qidong towards Liuzhou
Hengshan West towards Wuhan	Wuhan–Guangzhou high-speed railway	Leiyang West towards Guangzhou South
Xidu towards Huaihua South	Huaihua–Shaoyang–Hengyang railway	Terminus
Location

Hengyang East railway station (simplified Chinese: 衡阳东站; traditional Chinese: 衡陽東站; pinyin: Héngyáng dōng zhàn) is a railway station located in Zhuhui District, Hengyang, Hunan Province, China. It is on the Huaihua-Shaoyang-Hengyang railway, the Hengyang-Liuzhou intercity railway, and the Wuhan-Guangzhou high-speed railway, a segment of the Beijing–Guangzhou high-speed railway.

== See also ==
- Hengyang railway station
