= Liuzhou railway station =

Railway station in Liuzhou, Guangxi

Liuzhou 柳州
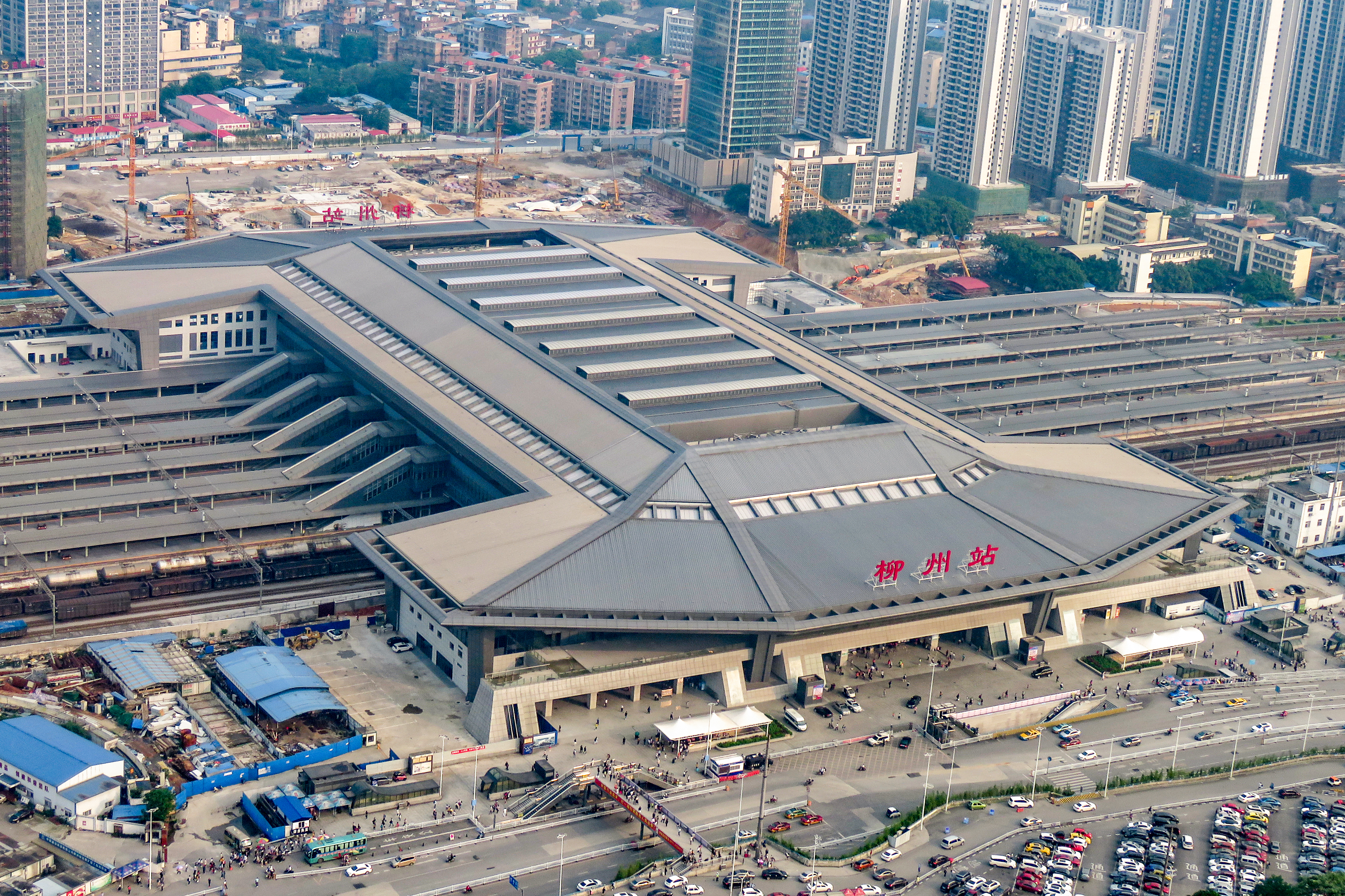
- The station building in 2019

General information
- Location: Liunan District, Liuzhou, Guangxi; China
- Coordinates: 24°18′37.74″N 109°23′0.34″E
- Lines: Hunan–Guangxi railway; Guizhou–Guangxi railway; Jiaozuo–Liuzhou railway; Liuzhou–Nanning intercity railway; Hengyang–Liuzhou intercity railway

Other information
- Station code: TMIS code: 36257; Telegraph code: LZZ; Pinyin code: LZH

History
- Opened: 1941

Services
Preceding station	China Railway	Following station
Yizhou towards Guiyang	Guizhou–Guangxi railway	Terminus
Luocheng towards Jiaozuo	Jiaozuo–Liuzhou railway	Terminus
Guilin towards Hengyang	Hunan–Guangxi railway	Laibin towards Pingxiang
Guilin North towards Beijing West	Beijing–Nanning–Hanoi	Nanning East towards Gia Lâm
Preceding station	China Railway High-speed	Following station
Luzhai North towards Hengyang East	Hengyang–Liuzhou intercity railway	Terminus
Terminus	Liuzhou–Nanning intercity railway	Laibin North towards Nanning
Location

Liuzhou railway station (Chinese: 柳州站) is a railway station in Liunan District, Liuzhou, Guangxi, China.

== History ==
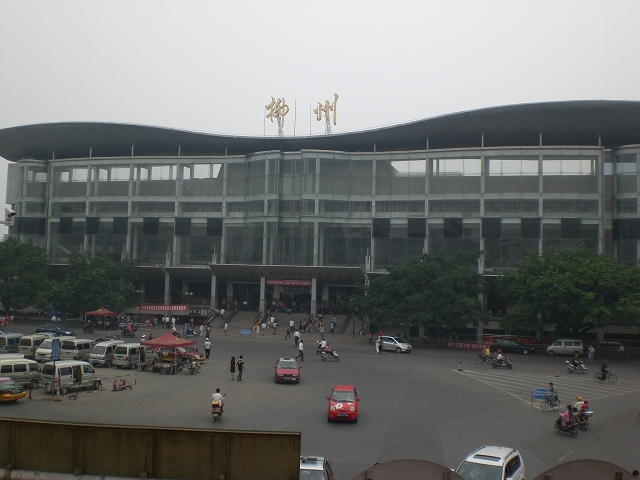
The station building in 2007

The station opened in 1941.

A new station building was completed in 2002.

On 31 December 2015, a project to rebuild and expand the station was started. On 1 March 2017, a new station building to the west of the line was opened and the old building to the east was closed. On 28 September 2019, the completed station was opened. The work saw a waiting room built across the tracks.
