= Hengyang–Liuzhou intercity railway =

Railway line in Hunan and Guangxi, China

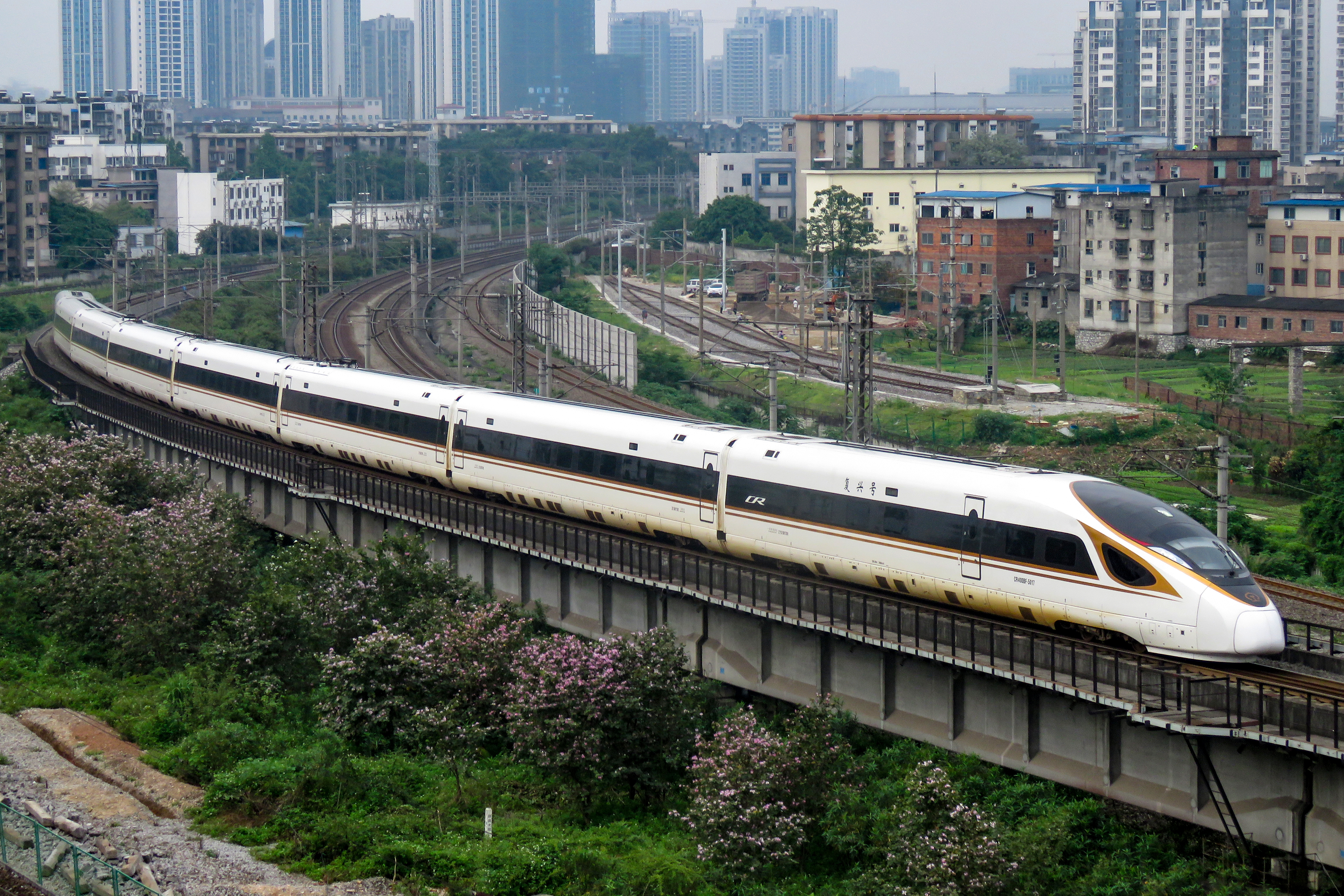
- Train G2344 leaving Liuzhou railway station

Overview
- Native name: 衡柳铁路
- Locale: Hengyang; Liuzhou
- Termini: Hengyang East; Liuzhou
- Stations: 16

Service
- Services: 1
- Operator(s): China Railway High-speed

History
- Opened: 28 December 2013

Technical
- Line length: 497.9 km (309 mi)
- Track gauge: 1,435 mm (4 ft 8 1/2 in)
- Minimum radius: 3,500 m (11,500 ft) (normal); 2,800 m (9,200 ft) (difficult); existing curve in local areas
- Electrification: 25 kV/50 Hz AC overhead catenary
- Operating speed: 250 km/h (155 mph); 200 km/h (124 mph) (Yongzhou–Guilin)
- Maximum incline: 0.6%

Hengyang–Liuzhou intercity railway is a high-speed railway in South-Western China, connecting Hunan and Guangxi provinces. It provides a high-speed connection with the Beijing–Guangzhou–Shenzhen–Hong Kong High-Speed Railway and links with the Guangxi capital of Nanning via the Liuzhou–Nanning intercity railway. It gives a direct high-speed services from Beijing to Guilin in only 10 hours.

== History ==
Construction commenced in 2009 and was completed in May 2013. It was opened for service on 28 December 2013.

== Route ==
The 497.9 km (309.4 mi) long route has a designed maximum speed of 250 km/h (155 mph). It departs from the Beijing–Guangzhou–Shenzhen–Hong Kong High-Speed Railway at Hengyang East Railway Station, it then travels west through the major cities of Yongzhou, Guilin and arriving at Liuzhou.
