= Xiamen–Chongqing corridor =

High-speed rail corridor

The Xiamen–Chongqing corridor is a high-speed rail corridor and one of the eight north–south routes in China's "Eight Vertical and Eight Horizontal" network.

== Route ==
Name	Route	Design speed (km/h)	Length (km)	Status	Construction start	Opened	Remarks
Longyan–Xiamen railway	Xiamen – Longyan	200	171	open	25 December 2006	29 June 2012	
Ganzhou–Ruijin–Longyan railway	Longyan – Ganzhou	200	249	open	29 December 2009	26 December 2015	
Ganzhou–Changsha HSR	Ganzhou – Changsha West	350	429	under construction	21 November 2022	Estimated in July 2030	
Changsha–Changde HSR	Changsha West – Changde	350	157	open	26 December 2017	26 December 2022	The Changde–Yiyang section shares the same route as the Hohhot–Nanning corridor.
Qianjiang–Changde railway	Changde – Qianjiang	200	336	open	16 December 2014	26 December 2019	
Chongqing–Guizhou ICR	Qianjiang – Chongqing	350	269	open	22 November 2018	27 June 2025	The Chongqing East to Chongqing section is under construction.
