= Hanshou South railway station =

Railway station in Changde, Hunan

Hanshou South 汉寿南

General information
- Location: Hanshou County, Changde, Hunan; China
- Coordinates: 28°50′41.11″N 111°56′21.29″E
- Line: Shimen–Changsha railway

History
- Opened: 1997
Location

Hanshou South railway station (Chinese: 汉寿南站; pinyin: Hànshòunán zhàn) is a railway station in Hanshou County, Changde, Hunan, China. It is an intermediate stop on the Shimen–Changsha railway.

The station opened in 1997. On 1 April 2022, the name of the station was changed from Hanshou to Hanshou South. The new station on the currently under construction Changde–Yiyang–Changsha high-speed railway simultaneously had its name changed from Hanshou South to Hanshou.

== See also ==
- Hanshou railway station, a station on Changde–Yiyang–Changsha HSR

| Preceding station | China Railway | Following station |
|---|---|---|
| Changde towards Shimenxian North | Shimen–Changsha railway | Yiyang towards Changsha |
