= Linli railway station =

Railway station in Changde, Hunan

Linli 临澧

General information
- Location: Linli County, Changde, Hunan; China
- Coordinates: 29°26′10″N 111°36′10.65″E
- Line: Shimen–Changsha railway

History
- Opened: 1997
Location

Linli railway station (Chinese: 临澧站) is a railway station in Linli County, Changde, Hunan, China. It is an intermediate stop on the Shimen–Changsha railway.

On 25 April 2014, the station was closed for construction work as part of the project to add a second track to the line. Initially expected to reopen in April 2015, it actually reopened in September 2016.

Preceding station	China Railway	Following station
Shimenxian North Terminus	Shimen–Changsha railway	Changde towards Changsha
