= Changde–Yiyang–Changsha high-speed railway =

High-speed rail line in China

Changde–Yiyang–Changsha high-speed railway 常益长高速铁路

Overview
- Status: In operation
- Termini: Changde; Changsha West
- Stations: 5

Service
- Operator(s): China Railway Guangzhou Group

Technical
- Line length: 154 km (96 mi)
- Track gauge: 1,435 mm (4 ft 8 1/2 in)
- Operating speed: 350 km/h (217 mph)

The Changde–Yiyang–Changsha high-speed railway or Changyichang high-speed railway (Chinese: 常益长高速铁路; pinyin: Chángyìcháng Gāosù Tiělù), also known as the Changde–Changsha section of Chongqing–Xiamen high-speed railway, is a high-speed railway in China. It is 157 kilometres (98 mi) long and has a design speed of 350 kilometres per hour (220 mph). The Changde–Yiyang section also forms part of the Hohhot–Nanning corridor.

The initial section from Yiyang South to Changsha West opened on 6 September 2022 (Changsha West railway station is under renovation and not opened to passengers, however trains can through service to Changsha-Zhuzhou-Xiangtan intercity railway here).

Hanshou railway station and Changde railway station opened on 26 December 2022.

== Route ==
The railway runs parallel the existing Shimen–Changsha railway between Changde and Changsha.

== Stations ==
Station Name	Chinese	Metro transfers/connections	China Railway and CRH transfers/connections
Changde	常德		Qianjiang–Changde railway Shimen–Changsha railway
Hanshou	汉寿		
Yiyang South	益阳南		
Ningxiang West	宁乡西		
Changsha West	长沙西		Changsha–Zhuzhou–Xiangtan intercity railway Changsha–Ganzhou high-speed railway (planned)
through service to Changsha-Zhuzhou-Xiangtan intercity railway
