= XTQ =

XTQ or xtq may refer to:

- Tumshuqese language (ISO 639-3: xtq), an extinct language of China
- Xiangtan railway station (Telegraph code: XTQ), Hunan, China
- Special Forces of Azerbaijan, Xüsusi Təyinatlı Qüvvələri
