= Shimenxian railway station =

Railway station in Changde, China

Coordinates: 29.5886°N 111.3677°E

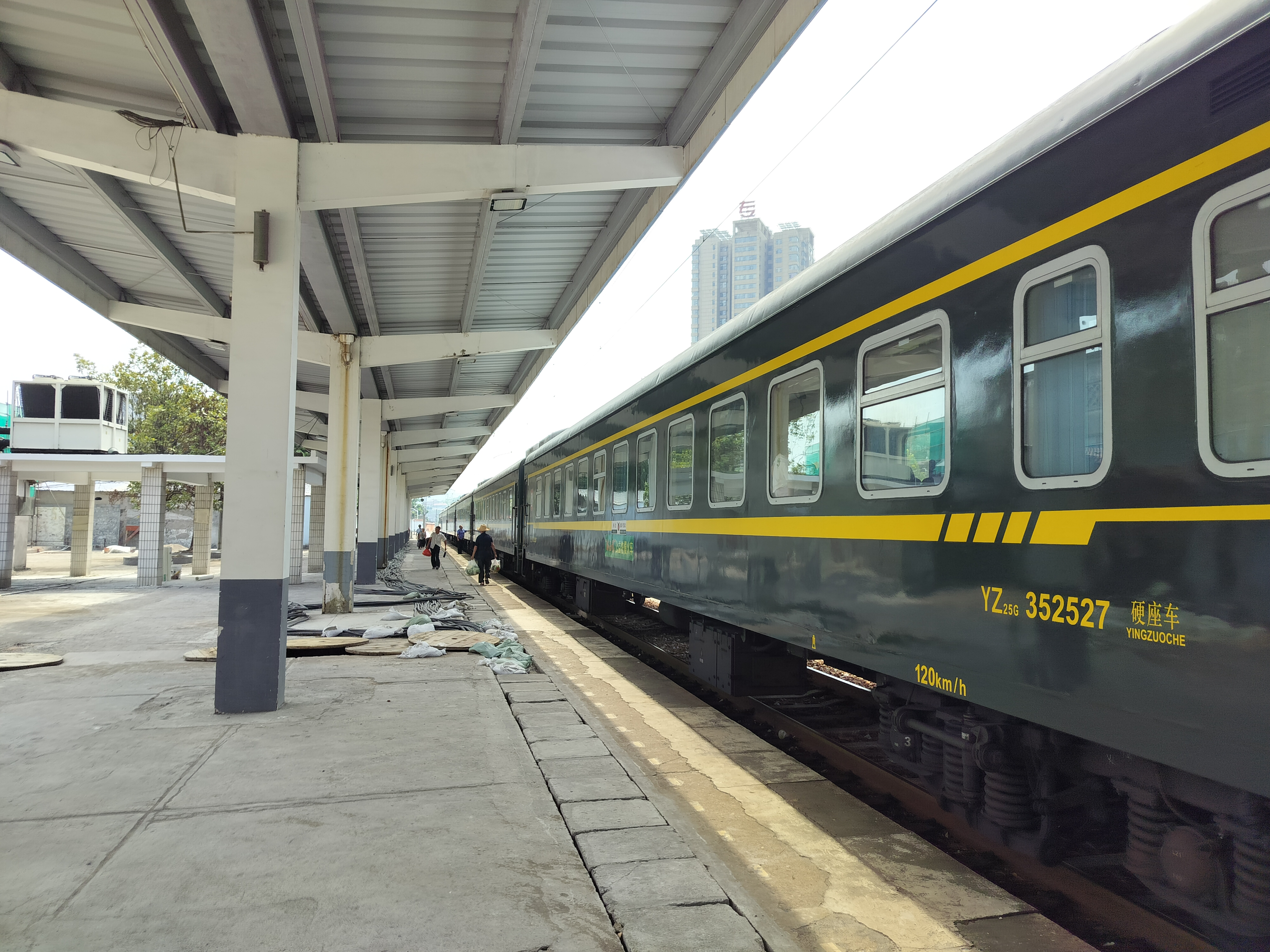

Shimenxian railway station (Chinese: 石门县站) is a fourth-class railway station in Shimen County, Changde, Hunan, China on the Jiaozuo–Liuzhou railway. It was built in 1978. Passenger services have been suspended since 3 July 2013 due to the better location of Shimenxian North railway station.

== See also ==
- Shimenxian North railway station
