= Changde railway station =

Railway station in Changde, China

Coordinates: 29.0745°N 111.6894°E

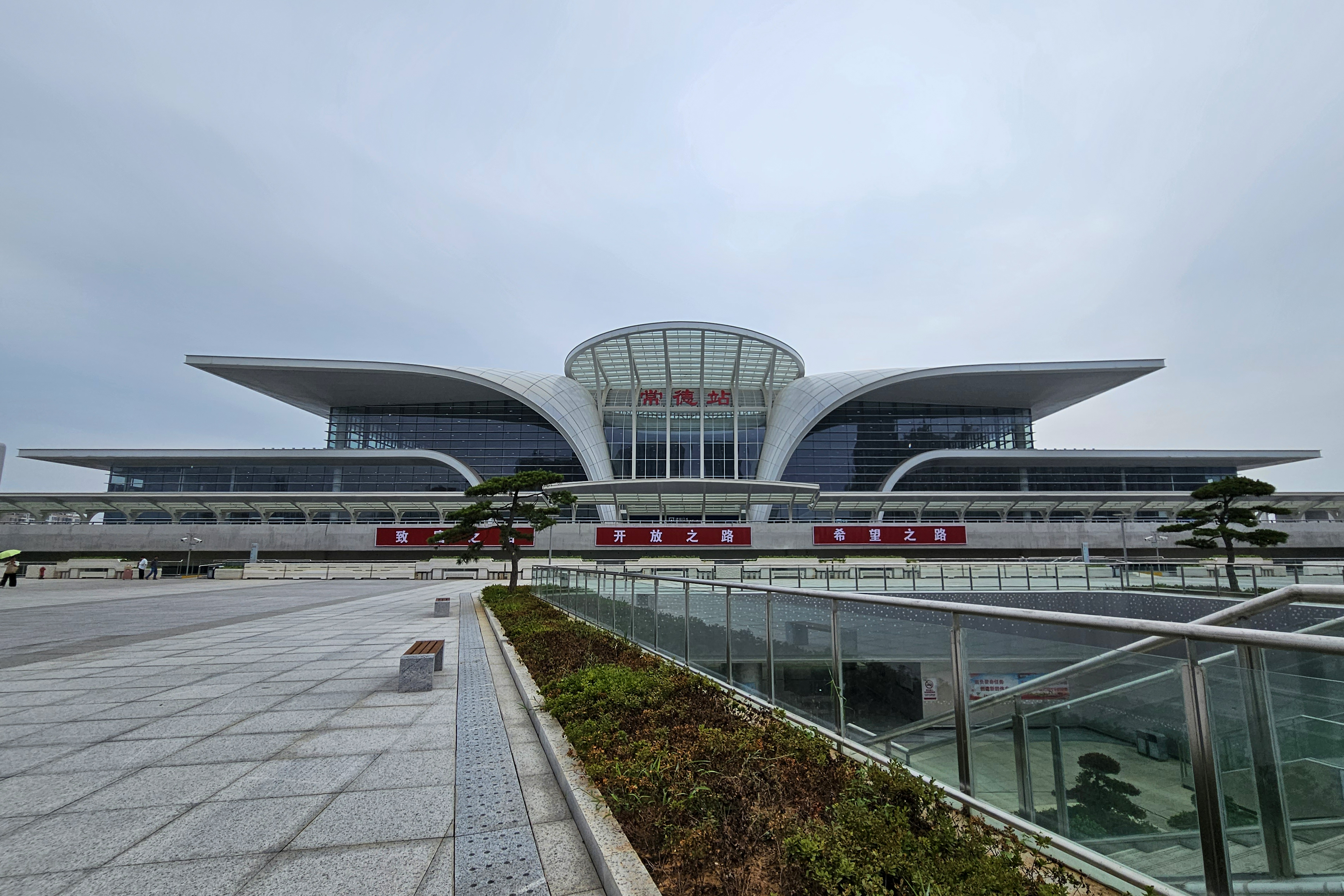
The station building of Changde railway station

Changde railway station is a railway station in Wuling District, Changde, Hunan, China on the Shimen–Changsha railway, Qianjiang–Changde railway, and Changde–Yiyang–Changsha high-speed railway.

Originally constructed in 1997, the station is located 80 kilometers from Shimen County North railway station and 184 kilometers from Laodaodahe railway station. The facility is managed by the Changsha Depot under the jurisdiction of the China Railway Guangzhou Group and currently holds the status of a second-class station.

The station's operations are dedicated exclusively to passenger services, including boarding, alighting, and the consignment of luggage and parcels. It does not handle freight traffic.

== History ==
On 26 December 2022, Changyichang high-speed railway was extended here.

Preceding station	China Railway	Following station
Linli towards Shimenxian North	Shimen–Changsha railway	Hanshou South towards Changsha
Taoyuan (Hunan) towards Qianjiang	Qianjiang–Changde railway	Terminus
