= Chongqing–Guizhou intercity railway =

Chongqing–Guizhou intercity railway simplified Chinese: 渝黔城际铁路; traditional Chinese: 渝黔城際鐵路; pinyin: Yúqián chéngjì tiělù

Overview
- Status: Open
- Owner: China Railway
- Locale: Fujian, China
- Termini: Chongqing, Qianjiang
- Stations: 8

Service
- Operator: CR Chengdu Group

Technical
- Line length: 270 km (170 mi)
- Num of tracks: 2
- Track gauge: 1,435 mm (4 ft 8 1/2 in)
- Minimum radius: 7,000 m (23,000 ft) (normal); 5,500 m (18,000 ft) (difficult)
- Electrification: 25 kV 50 Hz AC (overhead line)
- Operating speed: 350 kilometres per hour (220 mph) (design speed); 120 kilometres per hour (75 mph) (within the hub)

The Chongqing–Guizhou Intercity Railway simplified Chinese: 渝黔城际铁路; traditional Chinese: 渝黔城際鐵路; pinyin: Yúqián chéngjì tiělù, also known as the Chongqing–Qianjiang Intercity Railway or the "Chongqing section" of the Xiamen–Chongqing corridor, is an intercity railway connecting the main urban area of Chongqing with its Qianjiang District in China. It is an important backbone of the "Chengdu–Chongqing Economic Zone Rail Transit Network Plan". It was approved by the National Development and Reform Commission in October 2018, started construction on 22 November 2018, and was completed and opened to traffic on 27 June 2025. The final section between Chongqing East and Chongqing station was completed on 24 July 2026, but was not yet open to traffic as of November 2026.

== Introduction ==
The Chongqing–Guizhou Intercity Railway is 269 km (167 mi)-long. It was designed to be built as a double-track line in one phase, with a design speed of 350 km/h (220 mph). 94.47% of the line is runs over bridges or through tunnels. The total investment was approximately ¥ 53.5 billion, and the construction period was 5.5 years. It is a high-speed railway mainly used for passenger transport.

== History ==
On 19 October 2018, the National Development and Reform Commission approved the feasibility study report for the Chongqing–Guizhou intercity railway. On 22 November, the project officially commenced.

On 10 June 2020, construction of the Chongqing section began in full swing. On 26 April 2022, the No. 4 inclined shaft of the Chongqing Caiyuanba Yangtze River Railway Tunnel of the Chongqing–Guizhou ICR, undertaken by China Railway 14th Bureau, officially entered the tunnel construction phase, marking the start of the full-scale construction phase of China's longest underwater high-speed railway tunnel. On 30 July, the Baisunxi double-track bridge was completed. On 15 September, the Houjiapo Tunnel was successfully completed.

On 16 June 2023, the "Changjiang" shield tunneling machine of the line was launched, and China's first high-speed railway tunnel crossing the Yangtze River officially entered the shield tunneling construction stage. On 6 July, the first box girder of the Qianjiang section was successfully erected. On 24 August, the T-beam of the Shilianghe Double-Line Extra-Large Bridge No. 4 pier of the line, the T-beam of the tallest and longest span T-beam of China's high-speed railway projects under construction, was successfully closed. On 18 October, the Bazi Tunnel was successfully completed. On 30 November, the Yaojiayuanzi Tunnel was successfully completed. On 7 December, the first 10,000 m (33,000 ft)-long tunnel, the Guihuayuan Tunnel, was completed. On 27 December, the Pingshang Tunnel, the tunnel with the largest water inflow and the longest soluble rock section of the entire line, was successfully completed after 1,336 days. On 16 January 2024, the Shilianghe Double-Line Extra-Large Bridge was successfully closed. The T-beam of the No. 4 pier of the bridge is the largest span T-beam continuous beam in China's high-speed rail projects under construction. On 24 January, the Zhaojiapo No. 2 Tunnel was successfully completed. On 31 January, the Changtuhe Double-Line Bridge was successfully closed.

On 27 June 2025, the Chongqing–Guizhou Intercity Railway was opened to traffic. The final section between Chongqing East and Chongqing station was completed on 24 July 2026, but is not yet open to traffic.
