= Nanfu railway =

Nanfu railway may refer to:

- Nanchuan–Fuling railway, a railway in Chongqing under construction since 2008
- Nanping–Fuzhou railway, a railway in Fujian built in 1959
