= Yiyang railway station (Hunan) =

Railway station in Yiyang, Hunan, China

Yiyang railway station 益阳站
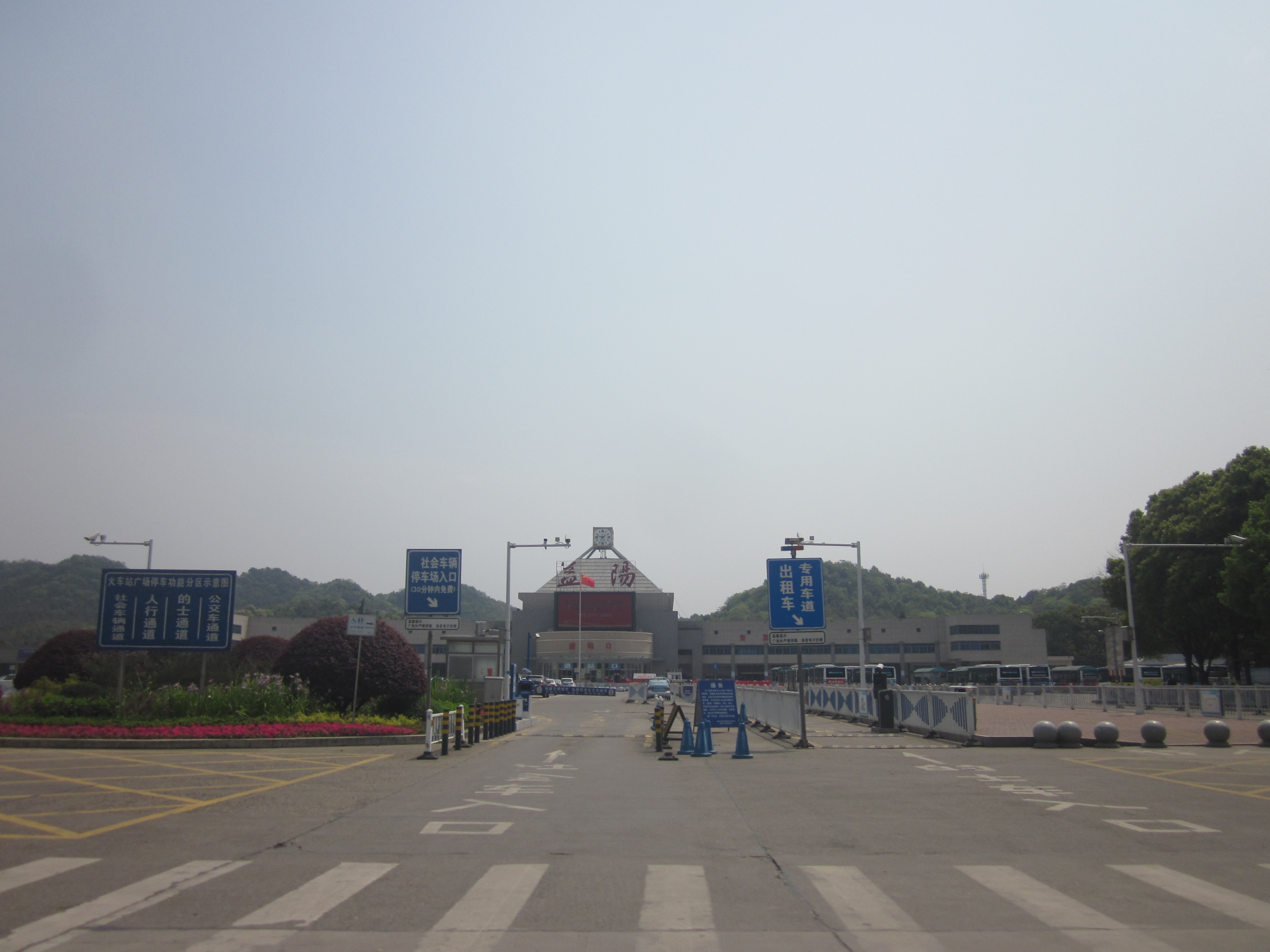
- Yiyang Railway Station.

General information
- Location: Heshan District, Yiyang, Hunan; China
- Coordinates: 28°32′28″N 112°20′11″E
- Operated by: China Railway Guangzhou Group
- Line(s): Shimen–Changsha railway Luoyang–Zhanjiang railway

History
- Opened: 26 December 1997

Chinese name
- Traditional Chinese: 益陽站
- Simplified Chinese: 益阳站
Transcriptions
Standard Mandarin
- Hanyu Pinyin: Yìyáng Zhàn

Yiyang railway station (Chinese: 益阳站) is a railway station located in Heshan District, Yiyang, Hunan, China, on the Shimen–Changsha railway and Luoyang–Zhanjiang railway lines, which are operated by China Railway Guangzhou Group.

== See also ==
- Yiyang South railway station

Preceding station	China Railway	Following station
Hanshou South towards Shimenxian North	Shimen–Changsha railway	Ningxiang towards Changsha
