= ZZX =

ZZX may refer to:

- The IOC country code for mixed teams at the Olympics
- The Spider-Man ZZX, a type of SYAC UAV (Chinese unmanned aerial vehicle)
- Zhuzhou West railway station, China Railway pinyin code ZZX
