= Baisha, Nanchuan District =

Baisha 白沙镇
- Town
- Location in Chongqing
- Coordinates: 29°22′29″N 106°55′20″E
- Country: People's Republic of China
- Direct-administered municipality: Chongqing
- District: Nanchuan District
- Time zone: UTC+8 (China Standard)

Baisha (Chinese: 白沙) is a town of Nanchuan District, Chongqing, China. As of 2018, it has 7 villages under its administration.

== See also ==
- List of township-level divisions of Chongqing
