= Liling railway station =

Railway station in Zhuzhou, Hunan

Liling 醴陵
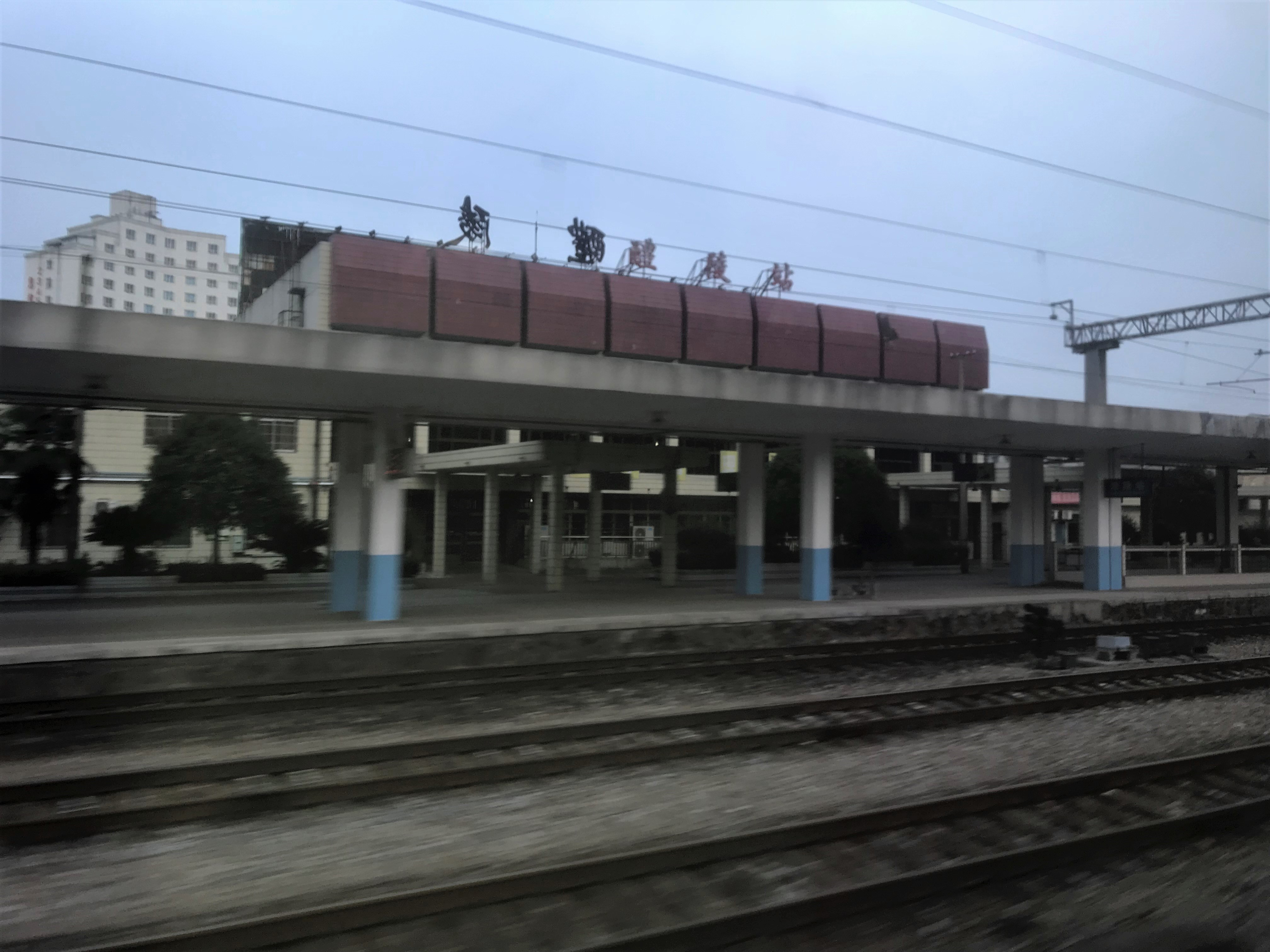

General information
- Location: Liling, Zhuzhou, Hunan; China
- Coordinates: 27.673276°N 113.505735°E
- Lines: Shanghai–Kunming railway; Liling–Chaling railway
Location

Liling railway station (Chinese: 醴陵站) is a railway station in Liling, Zhuzhou, Hunan, China. It is an intermediate station on the Shanghai–Kunming railway, and the northern terminus of the Liling–Chaling railway.

| Preceding station | China Railway | Following station |
|---|---|---|
| Pingxiang towards Shanghai or Shanghai South | Shanghai–Kunming railway | Zhuzhou towards Kunming |
