= Jingkou railway station =

Railway station in Chongqing, China

Coordinates: 29.6544°N 106.4592°E

Jingkou 井口
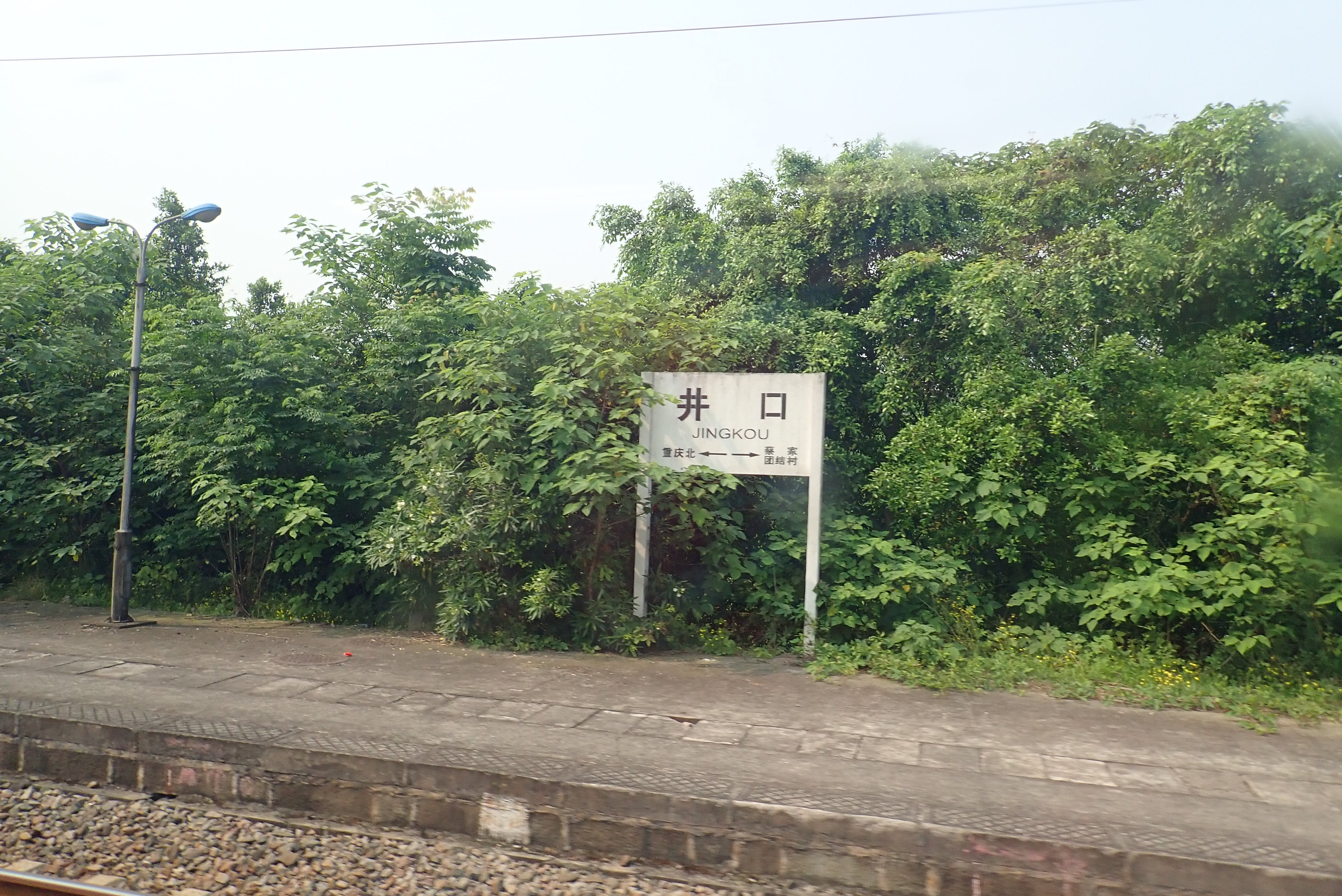
- Station sign

General information
- Location: Jingkou, Shapingba District, Chongqing; China
- Operator: China Railway Corporation
- Lines: Suiyu railway Yuhuai Railway

Other information
- Station code: TMIS code: 35140; Telegraph code: WWW; Pinyin code: JKO
Location

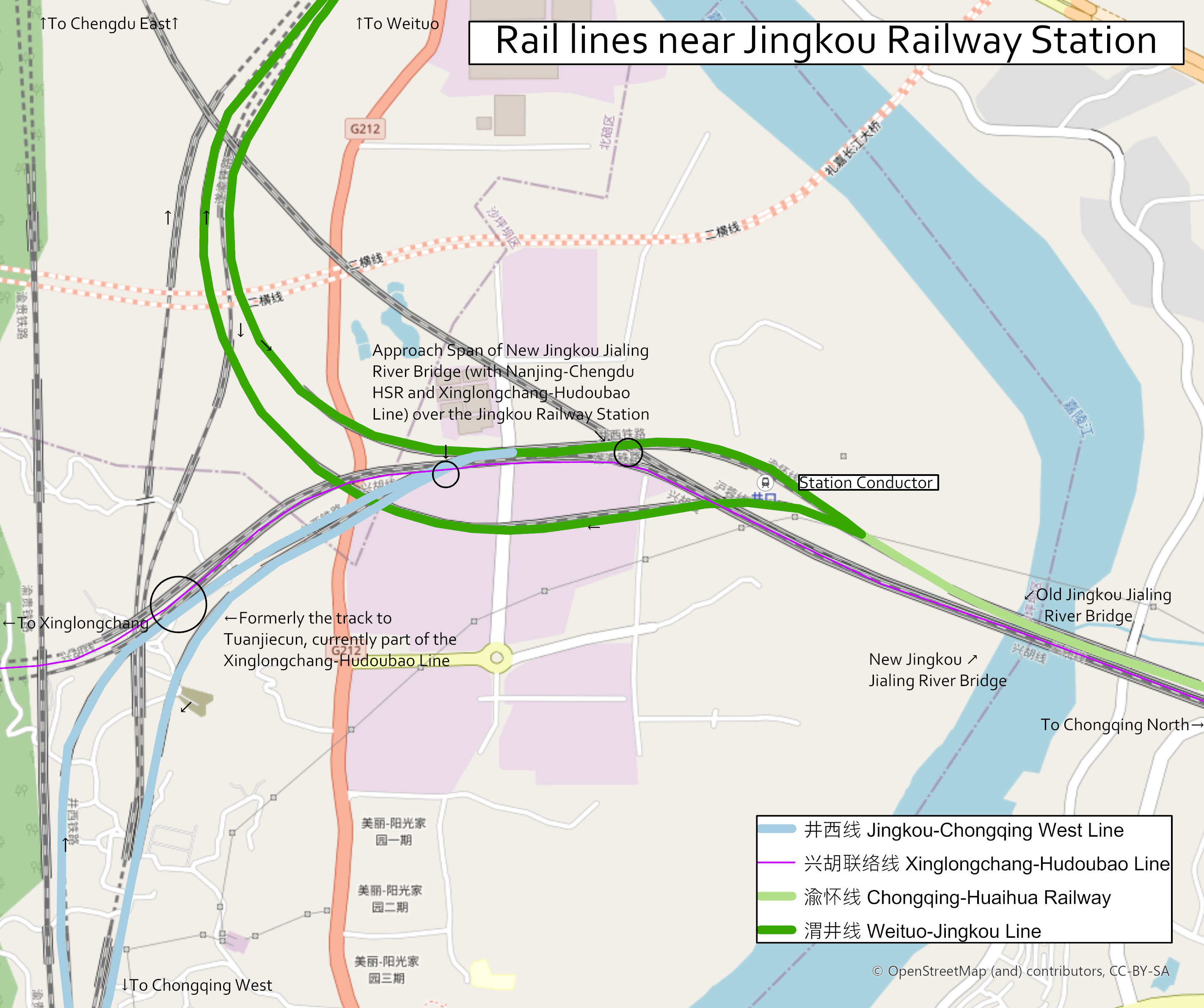
Tracks near Jingkou Railway Station.

Jingkou railway station is a railway station located in Shapingba District, Chongqing, People's Republic of China, on the Suiyu railway which operated by China Railway Corporation.
