= Zhuzhou West railway station =

Railway station in Hunan, China

Zhuzhouxi 株洲西
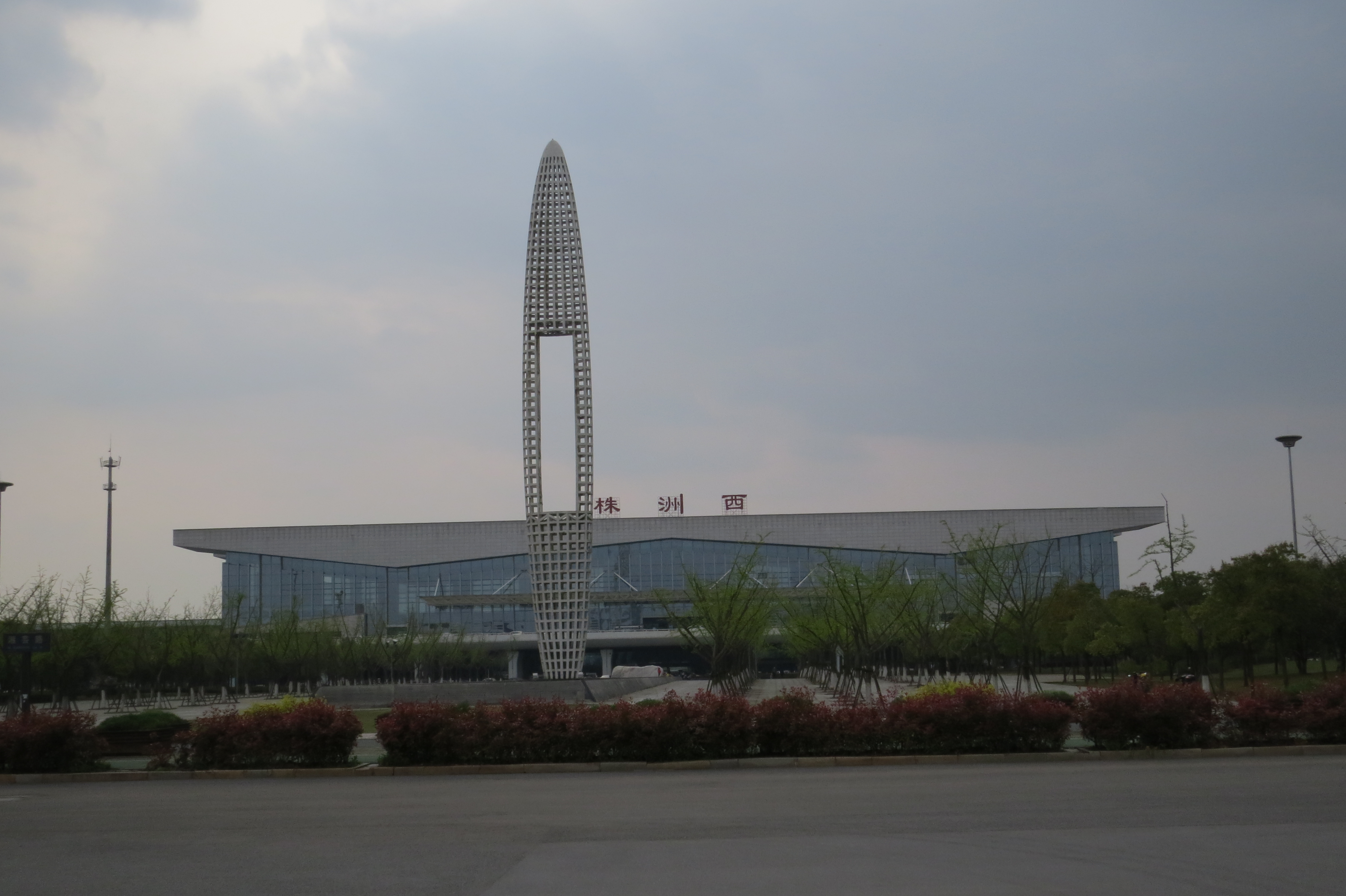

General information
- Other names: Zhuzhou West
- Location: Qunfeng, Tianyuan District, Zhuzhou, Hunan; China
- Coordinates: 27°47′35.47″N 113°3′44.46″E
- Operated by: China Railway Guangzhou Group
- Line: Wuhan–Guangzhou High-Speed Railway

Other information
- Station code: TMIS code: 65821; Telegraph code: ZAQ; Pinyin code: ZZX

History
- Opened: 2009
Location

Zhuzhou West railway station (Chinese: 株洲西站; pinyin: Zhūzhōu xī zhàn) is a station on the Wuhan–Guangzhou High-Speed Railway, serving the city of Zhuzhou, in Hunan Province of China. The station is located on the western outskirts of the city, about 10 km west of downtown Zhuzhou and the "conventional" Zhuzhou railway station.

The station building consists of a waiting hall located on the eastern side of the high-speed lines, connected to the platforms via an overhead bridge and exit tunnel beneath the lines. The McDonald's is located inside the waiting hall, and a KFC is located beside the exit.

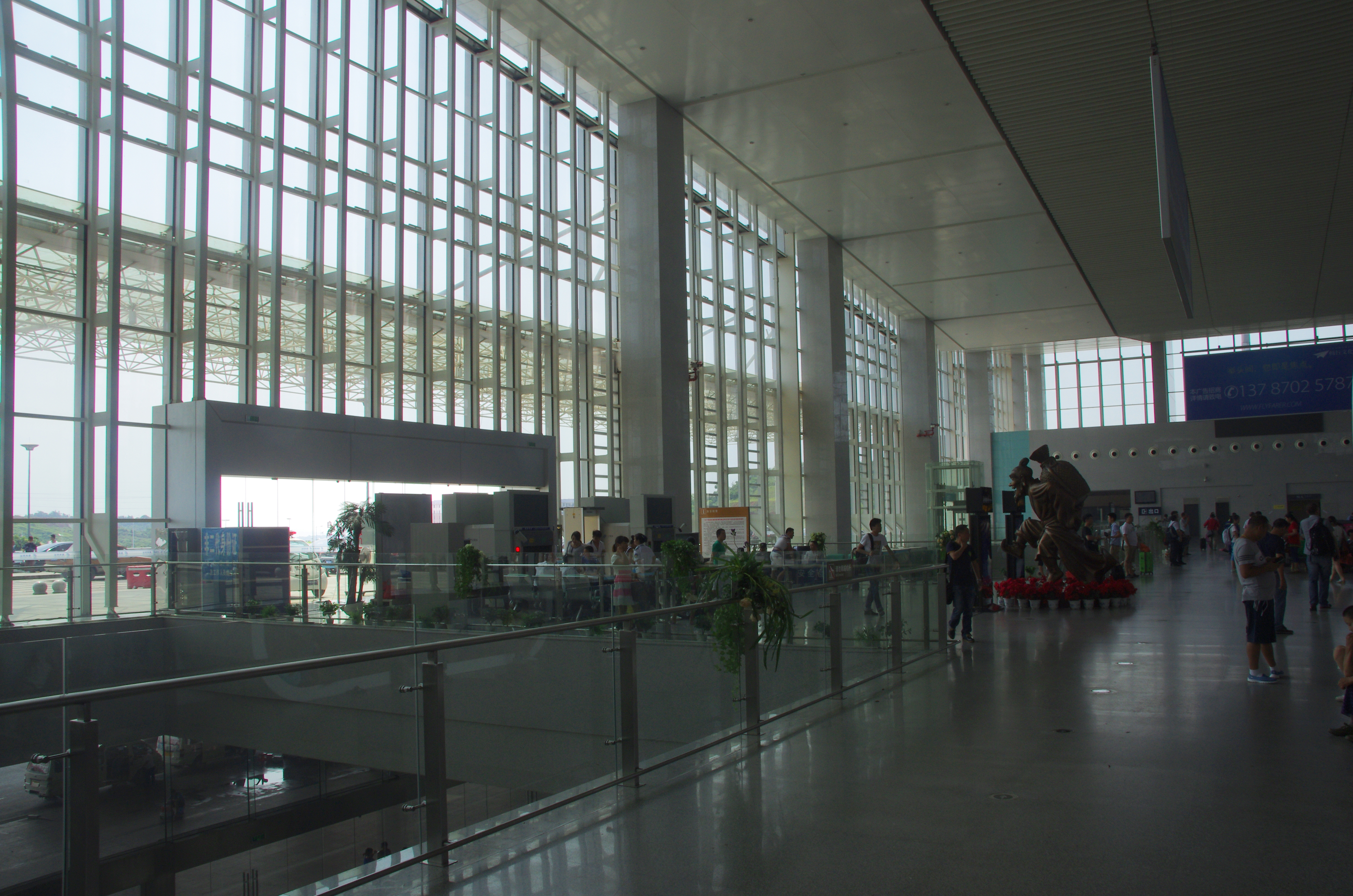
View of the entrance of Zhuzhou West railway station

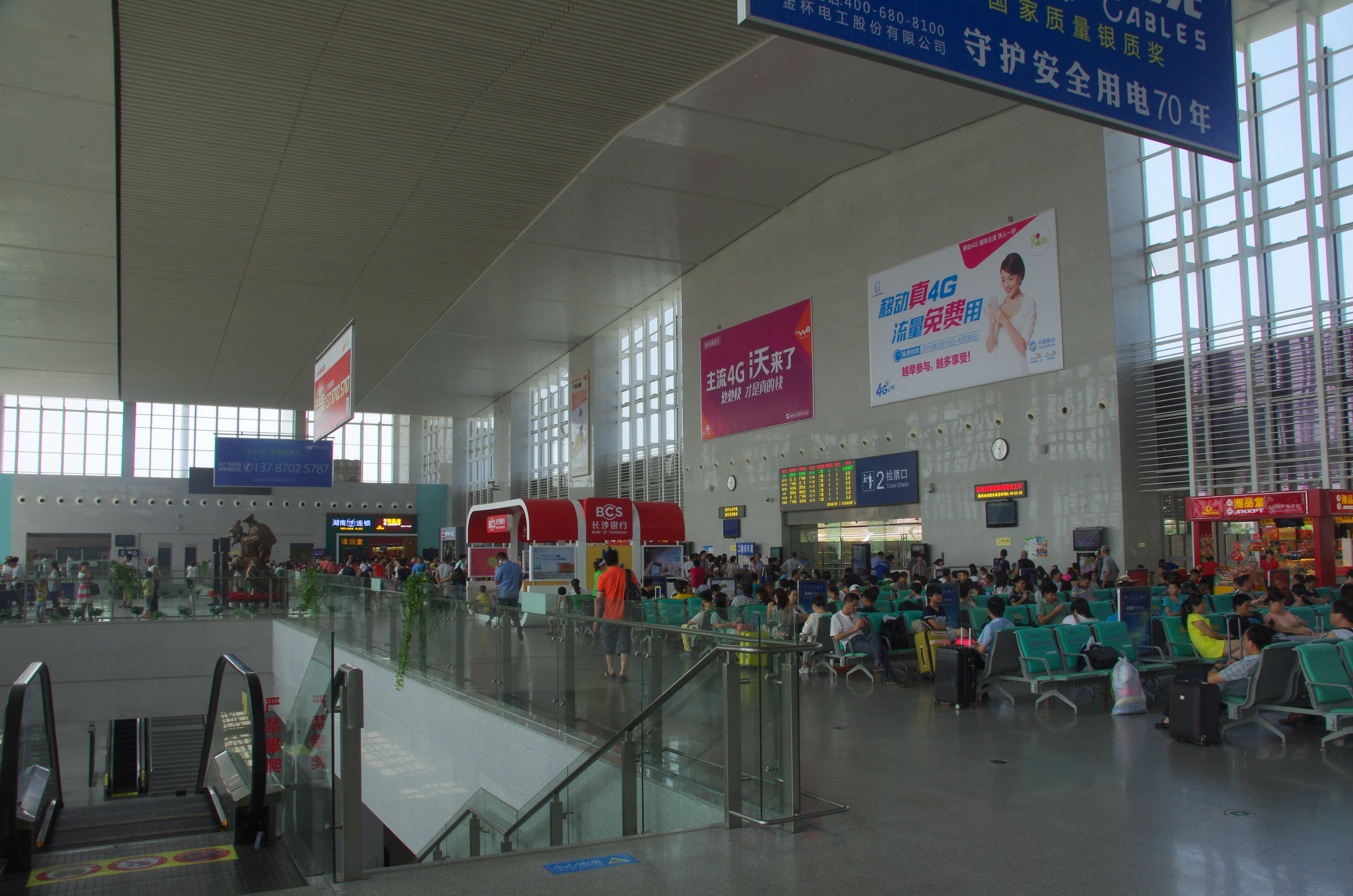
Waiting Hall of Zhuzhou West railway station

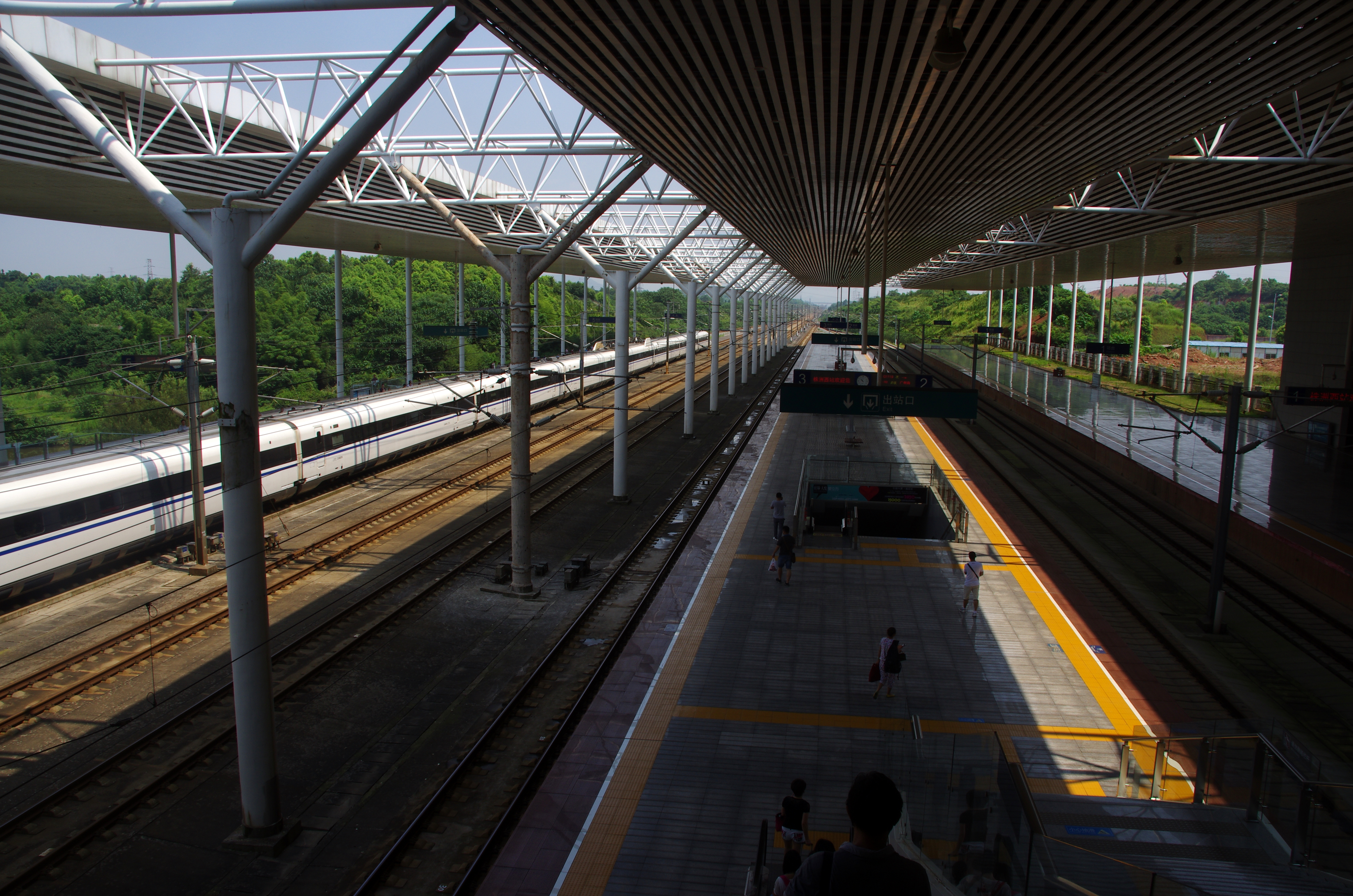
Looking north across the platforms at Zhuzhou West railway station

Preceding station	China Railway High-speed	Following station
Changsha South towards Wuhan	Wuhan–Guangzhou high-speed railway	Hengshan West towards Guangzhou South
