= Qianjiang–Changde railway =

Railway line between Qianjiang and Changde

Overview
- Status: Operational
- Termini: Qianjiang; Changde
- Stations: 10

Service
- Type: Higher-speed rail, Heavy rail
- Operator: China Railway Guangzhou Group

History
- Opened: 26 December 2019

Technical
- Line length: 336 km (209 mi)
- Track gauge: 1,435 mm (4 ft 8 1/2 in) standard gauge
- Electrification: 50 Hz 25,000 V
- Operating speed: 200 km/h (124 mph)

The Qianjiang–Changde railway is an electrified higher-speed railway in China. It forms part of the Xiamen–Chongqing corridor of the eight north–south routes in China's "Eight Vertical and Eight Horizontal" network.

== History ==
Testing began on 14 October 2019. The railway opened on 26 December.

== Stations ==
The line has the following passenger stations:

- Qianjiang (interchange with the Chongqing–Huaihua railway, planned interchange with the Chongqing–Qianjiang intercity railway)
- Xianfeng
- Laifeng
- Longshan North
- Sangzhi
- Zhangjiajie West (planned interchange with the Zhangjiajie–Huaihua high-speed railway and Yichang–Zhangjiajie high-speed railway)
- Niuchehe
- Taoyuan
- Changde (interchange with the Shimen–Changsha railway)
