= Yiyang South railway station =

Railway station in Yiyang, Hunan

Yiyang South 益阳南

General information
- Location: Yiyang, Hunan; China
- Coordinates: 28°31′5.78″N 112°19′17.91″E
- Line: Changde–Yiyang–Changsha high-speed railway

History
- Opened: 6 September 2022
Location

Yiyang South railway station (Chinese: 益阳南站) is a railway station in Yiyang, Hunan, China. It is currently the western terminus of the Changde–Yiyang–Changsha high-speed railway. It opened on 6 September 2022 along with the first section of the line.

== Structure ==
The station building has an arched facade with detailing said to be inspired by traditional bamboo craft. The waiting hall is above the platforms and spans the full length of the building.

== See also ==
- Yiyang railway station
