= Zhuzhou railway station =

Railway station in Lusong District, Zhuzhou, Hunan

Zhuzhou 株洲
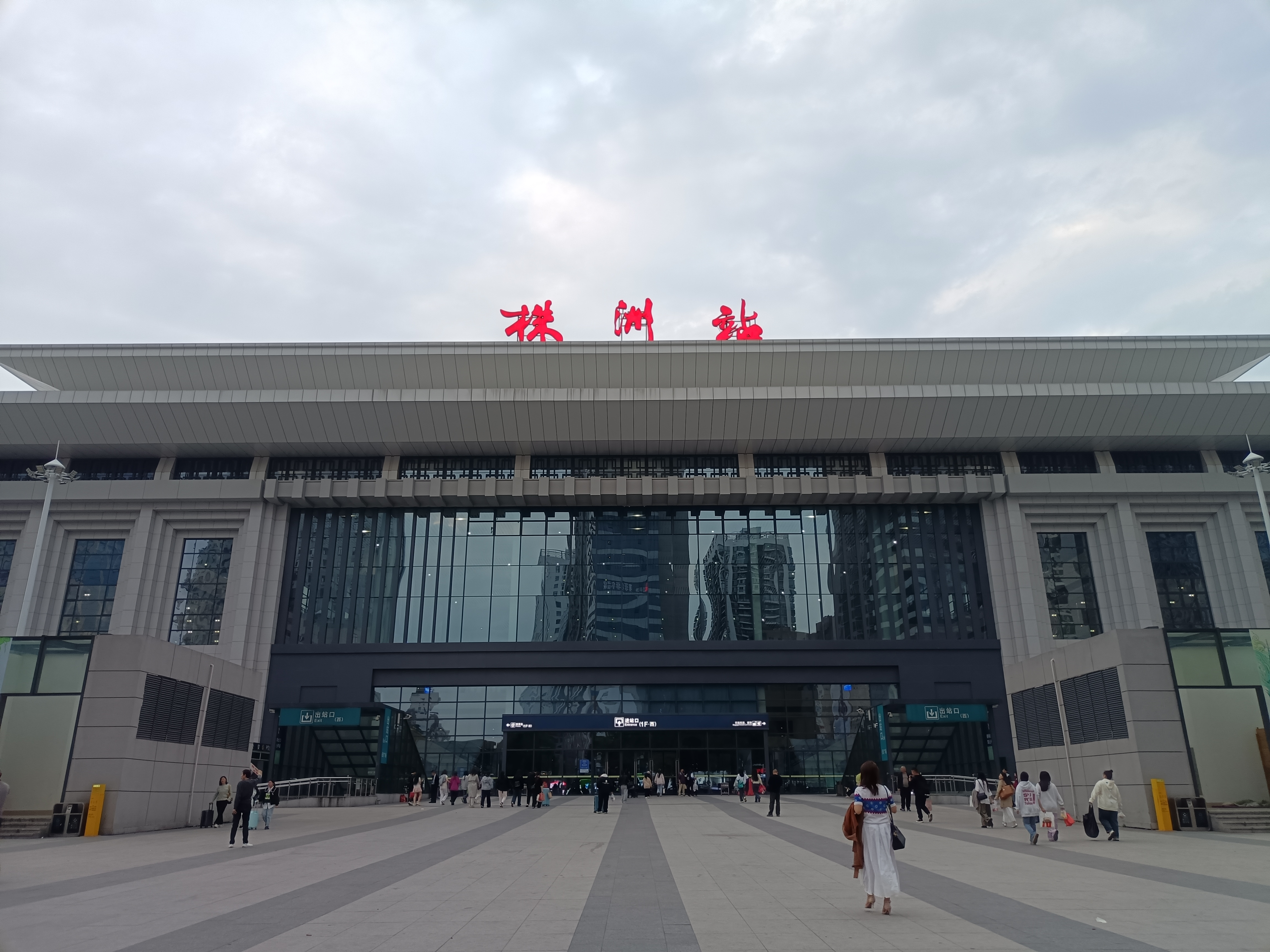

General information
- Location: Lusong District, Zhuzhou, Hunan; China
- Coordinates: 27°50′17.30″N 113°9′6.23″E
- Line(s): Beijing–Guangzhou railway; Shanghai–Kunming railway; Changsha–Zhuzhou–Xiangtan intercity railway
Location

Zhuzhou railway station (Chinese: 株洲站; pinyin: Zhūzhōu zhàn) is a railway station in Lusong District, Zhuzhou, Hunan, China. It is located at the intersection of the Beijing–Guangzhou railway and the Shanghai–Kunming railway, and also serves as an intermediate stop on the Changsha–Zhuzhou–Xiangtan intercity railway.

The station was closed from 20 October 2021 to 30 June 2022 for expansion works.

Preceding station	China Railway	Following station
Changsha towards Beijing or Beijing West	Beijing–Guangzhou railway	Hengshan towards Guangzhou
Liling towards Shanghai or Shanghai South	Shanghai–Kunming railway	Xiangtan towards Kunming
