= Changsha–Zhuzhou–Xiangtan intercity railway =

Higher-speed railway line in China

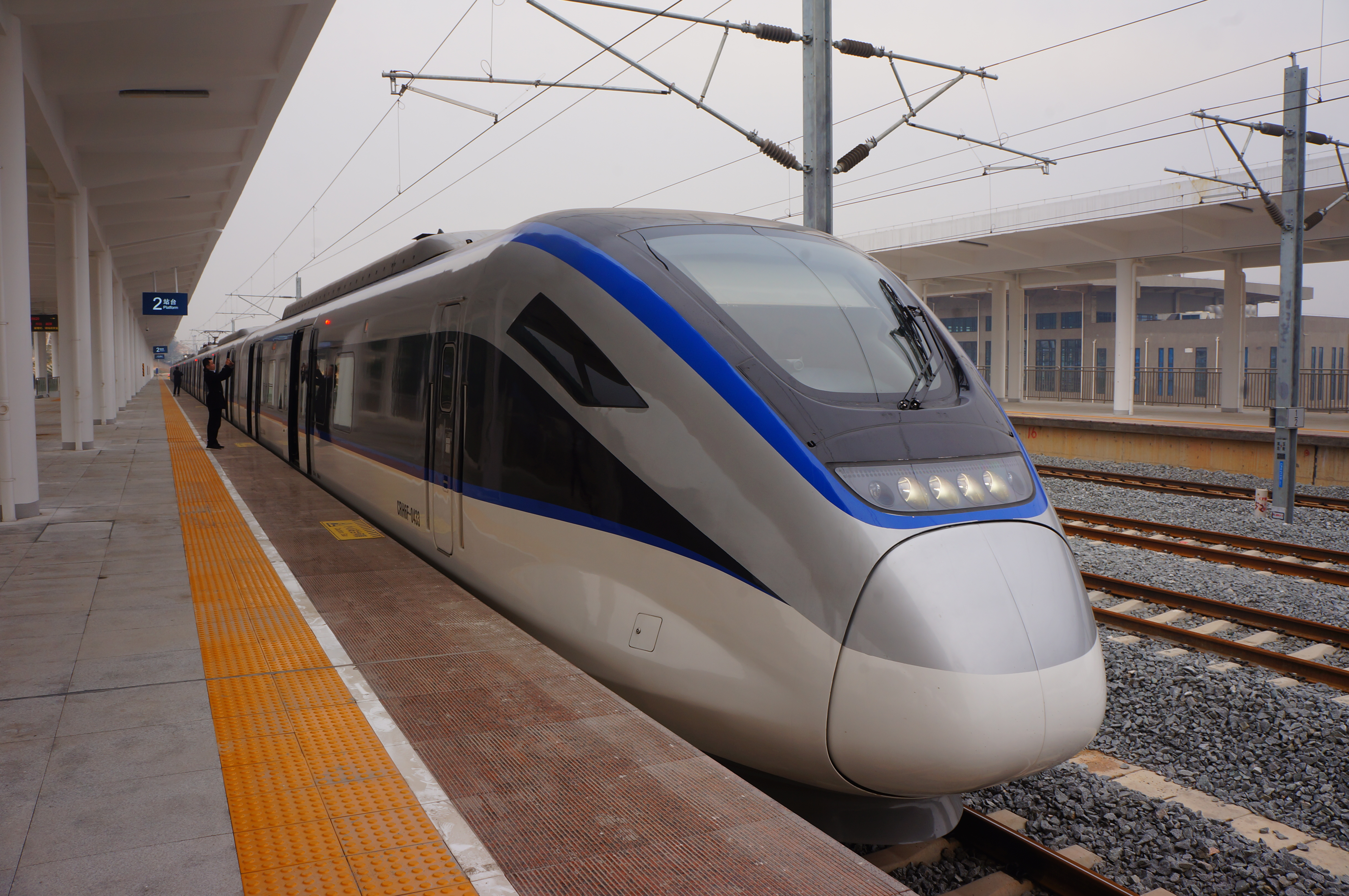
- CRH6F at Changsha West railway station

Overview
- Native name: 长株潭城际铁路
- Status: Operational
- Locale: Hunan, China
- Termini: Changsha West; Zhuzhou South / Xiangtan
- Stations: 21

Service
- Type: higher-speed rail
- Services: 3
- Operator: China Railway Guangzhou Group

History
- Opened: 26 December 2016

Technical
- Line length: 97.5 km (61 mi)
- Track gauge: 1,435 mm (4 ft 8 1/2 in)
- Operating speed: 200 km/h (124 mph)

Changsha–Zhuzhou–Xiangtan intercity railway or Changzhutan intercity railway (Chinese: 长株潭城际铁路; pinyin: Cháng–Zhū–Tán chéngjì tiělù), is a higher-speed regional railway in Hunan, China. It connects the provincial capital Changsha with Zhuzhou and Xiangtan. The line was opened to traffic on 26 December 2016. A northwestern extension to Changsha West railway station opened on 26 December 2017. The maximum operating speed is expected to be up to 200 km/h (124 mph), travelling time between the three cities will be shortened to less than 30 minutes. The line uses China Railways CRH6F regional rail trains.

Despite being a China Railway intercity rail line, it's marked by Changsha Metro map as Line S1.

== Overview ==
Changsha–Zhuzhou–Xiangtan intercity railway is envisioned to promote regional economic integration of the Changsha–Zhuzhou–Xiangtan area. Originally proposed a regional rapid transit system, it was redesigned to be built to mainline high-speed railway standards. CR Guangzhou Group, the Hunan Development and Investment Group, the Ministry of Railways and the Hunan provincial government jointly established the "Hunan Intercity Railway Co", which is responsible for the construction and operation of this project. The first phase, with a total length of 96 km (60 mi), with two branches from Zhuzhou and Xiangtan converging into a central trunk line in central Changsha. It will be funded with a total investment of 23.3 billion yuan. It will be built as a double tracked electrified railway with a maximum design speed of 200 km/h (124 mph), using automatic block control. Initially trains only had an average occupancy rate of 25% with citizens complaining about high prices and infrequent service. In 2017, along with the northwestern extension the railway's operations dramatically changed, frequencies were increased and distinct local/express services were established.

The railway was extended further north from Changsha West to connect to the Shimen–Changsha railway. The extension opened in 2020.

== Stations ==
This intercity railway travels across Changsha, Zhuzhou and Xiangtan. It is built hoping to improve regional public transport and integrate with each city's local transport with transfers to local bus services and the Changsha Metro network. A total of 21 stations will be built across the board, including 12 in Changsha, Zhuzhou with five and four in Xiangtan.

Route		Station №	Station Name	Chinese	Distance km		China Railway transfers/connections	Metro transfers/connections	Location	
●		RXQ	Changsha West (Changshaxi) (U/C)	长沙西	0.00	0.00	Changde–Yiyang–Changsha high-speed railway (through service)		Wangcheng	Changsha
●		BNQ	Lugu	麓谷					Wangcheng	Changsha
●		JPQ	Jianshan	尖山					Yuelu	Changsha
●		FFQ	Gushan	谷山					Yuelu	Changsha
●		FGQ	Bafangshan	八方山					Yuelu	Changsha
●		FKQ	Guanshaling	观沙岭				4	Yuelu	Changsha
●		FLQ	Kaifusi	开福寺				1	Kaifu	Changsha
●		CSQ	Changsha	长沙				2 3	Furong	Changsha
●		FMQ	Shumuling	树木岭				4	Yuhua	Changsha
●		FNQ	Xiangzhanglu	香樟路					Yuhua	Changsha
●		FVQ	Xiangfulu	湘府路					Yuhua	Changsha
●		FWQ	Dongjing	洞井					Yuhua	Changsha
●		NQQ	Xianfeng	先锋				1 (Zhongxin Square)	Tianxin	Changsha
●		KCQ	Furong South (Furongnan)	芙蓉南					Tianxin	Changsha
●		KIQ	Muyun	暮云					Tianxin	Changsha
●	｜	KJQ	Jiulangshan	九郎山					Shifeng	Zhuzhou
●	｜	KQQ	Tianxin East (Tianxindong)	田心东					Shifeng	Zhuzhou
●	｜	KRQ	Dafeng	大丰					Shifeng	Zhuzhou
●	｜	ZZQ	Zhuzhou	株洲					Lusong	Zhuzhou
●	｜	KVQ	Zhuzhou South (Zhuzhounan)	株洲南					Lusong	Zhuzhou
｜	●	KWQ	Zhaoshan	昭山					Yuetang	Xiangtan
｜	●	KXQ	Hetang	荷塘					Yuetang	Xiangtan
｜	●	NGQ	Bantang	板塘					Yuetang	Xiangtan
｜	●	XTQ	Xiangtan	湘潭					Yuhu	Xiangtan
