= Liugoulong station =

Metro station in Changsha, China

Liugoulong station 六沟垅
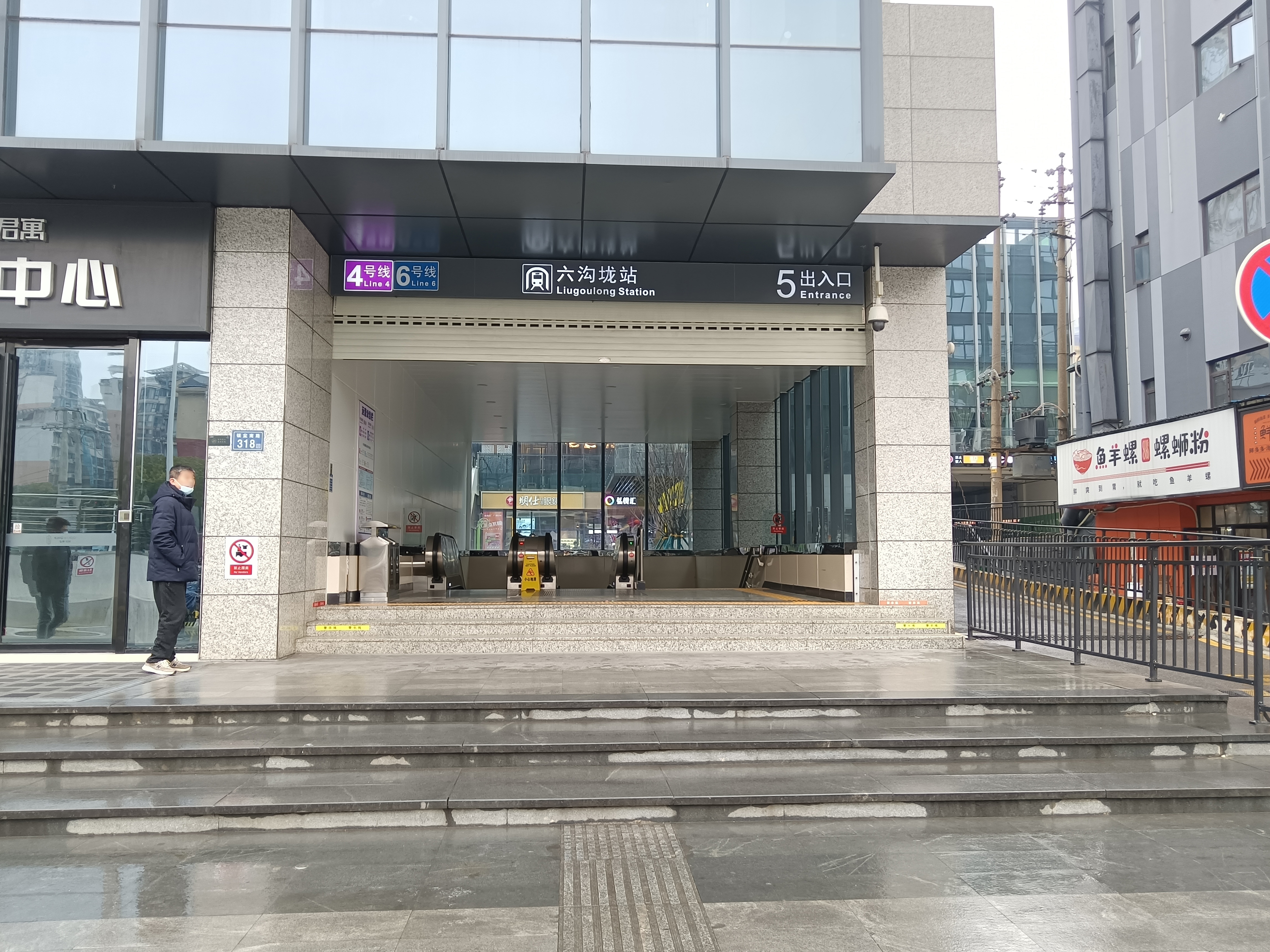
- Entrance 5

General information
- Location: Yuelu District, Changsha, Hunan; China
- Coordinates: 28°13′28″N 112°56′56″E
- Operator: Changsha Metro
- Lines: Line 4 Line 6
- Platforms: 4 (2 island platforms)

History
- Opened: 26 May 2019 (Line 4); 28 June 2022 (Line 6)

Services
| Preceding station | Changsha Metro | Following station |
|---|---|---|
| Guanshaling towards Guanziling | Line 4 | Wangyuehu towards Dujiaping |
| The Third Xiangya Hospital towards Xiejiaqiao | Line 6 | Wenchangge towards Huanghua Airport T1 & T2 |
Location

Liugoulong station (simplified Chinese: 六沟垅站; traditional Chinese: 六溝垅站; pinyin: Liùgōulǒng Zhàn) is a subway interchange station in Changsha, Hunan, China, operated by the Changsha subway operator Changsha Metro.

== Station layout ==
The station has two island platforms.

== History ==
The station was completed in August 2017. The station opened on 26 May 2019. It later became an interchange on June 28, 2022 after the opening of Line 6.

== Surrounding area ==
- Hunan University of Traditional Chinese Medicine
- Xiangya Third Hospital of Central South University
- Xiangya School of Medicine, Central South University
- Zhonglian Science Park (中联科技园)
- Binjiang School (滨江小学)
- Yuelu District Children's Palace
