= Xiangfulu railway station =

Railway station in Changsha, China

Xiangfulu railway station 湘府路
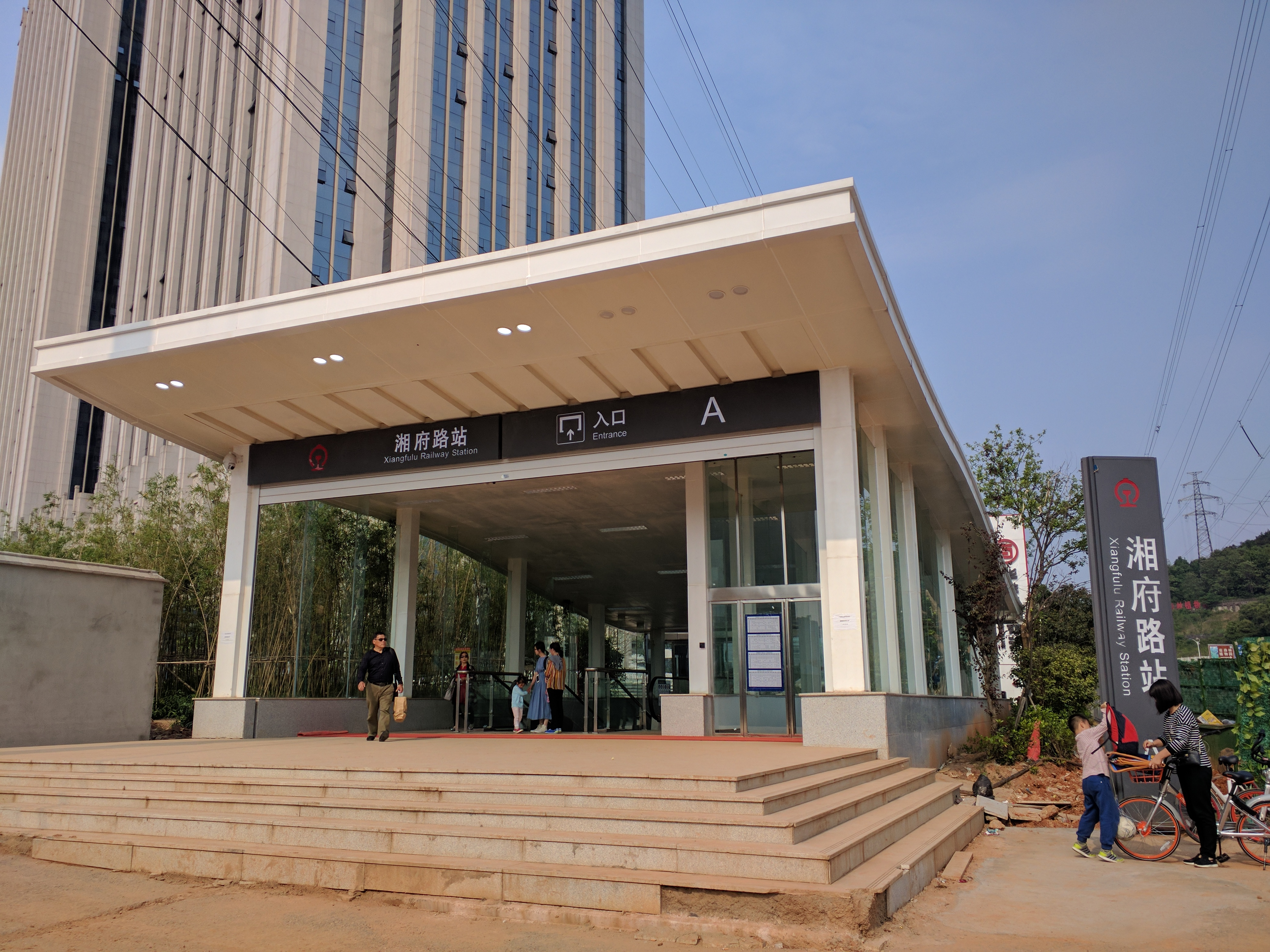
- Exit A of the station

General information
- Location: Yuhua District, Changsha, Hunan; China
- Coordinates: 28.1136°N 113.0238°E
- Operated by: CR Guangzhou
- Line: Changsha-Zhuzhou-Xiangtan intercity railway

Other information
- Station code: FVQ (Telegraph); XFL (Pinyin); 65219 (Station)

History
- Opened: 26 December 2016
Location

Xiangfulu station (Chinese: 湘府路) is a railway station in Yuhua District, Changsha, Hunan, China, operated by CR Guangzhou. It opened its services on 26 December 2016.

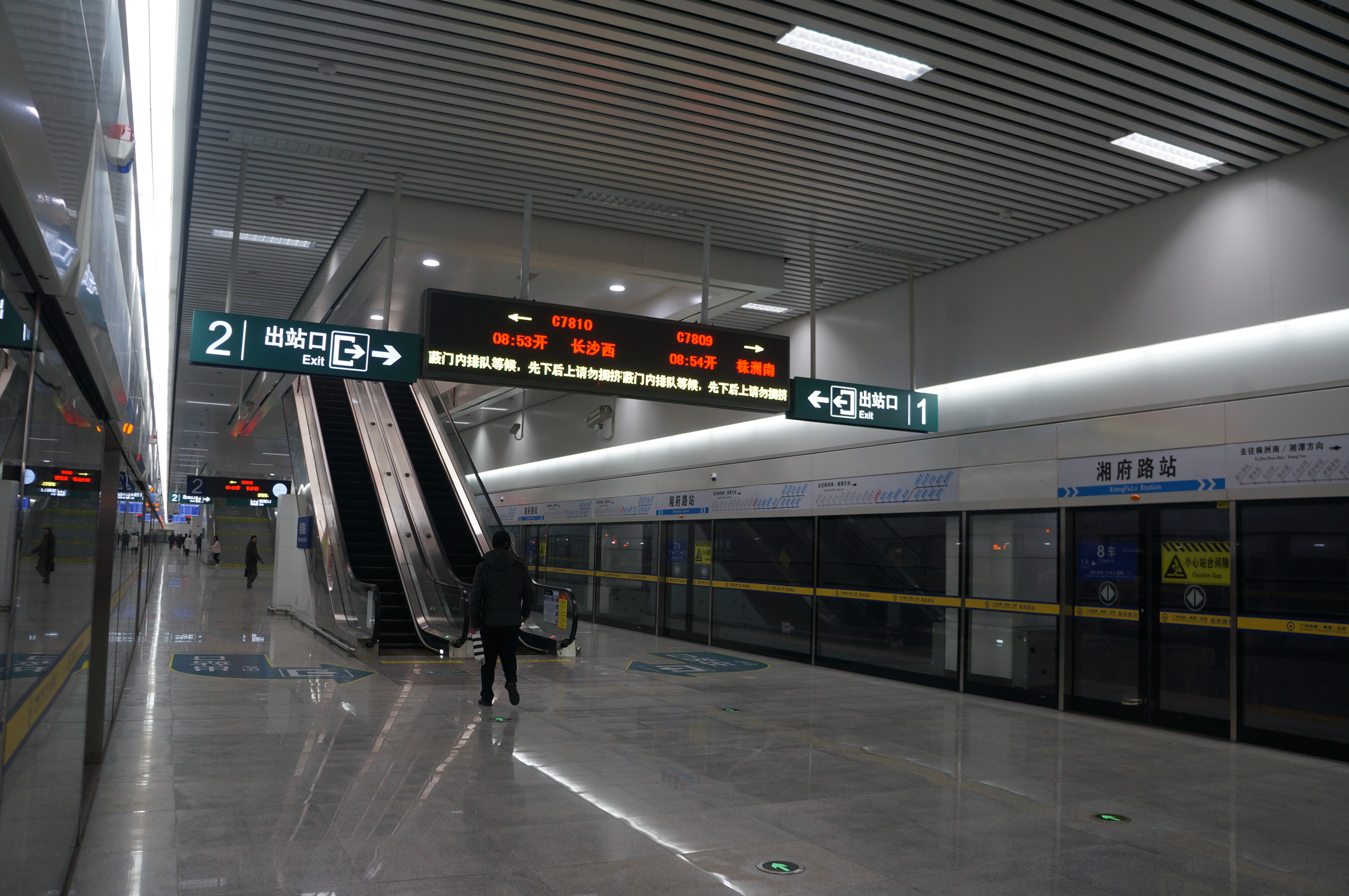
Station platform

There are two underground layers to the station, with the railway line on an island platform on the second layer. The station is near the Hunan Botanical Garden.
