= Changshou Yangtze River Railway Bridge =

Bridge in Chongqing, China

Changshou Yangtze River Railway Bridge 渝怀铁路长寿长江大桥
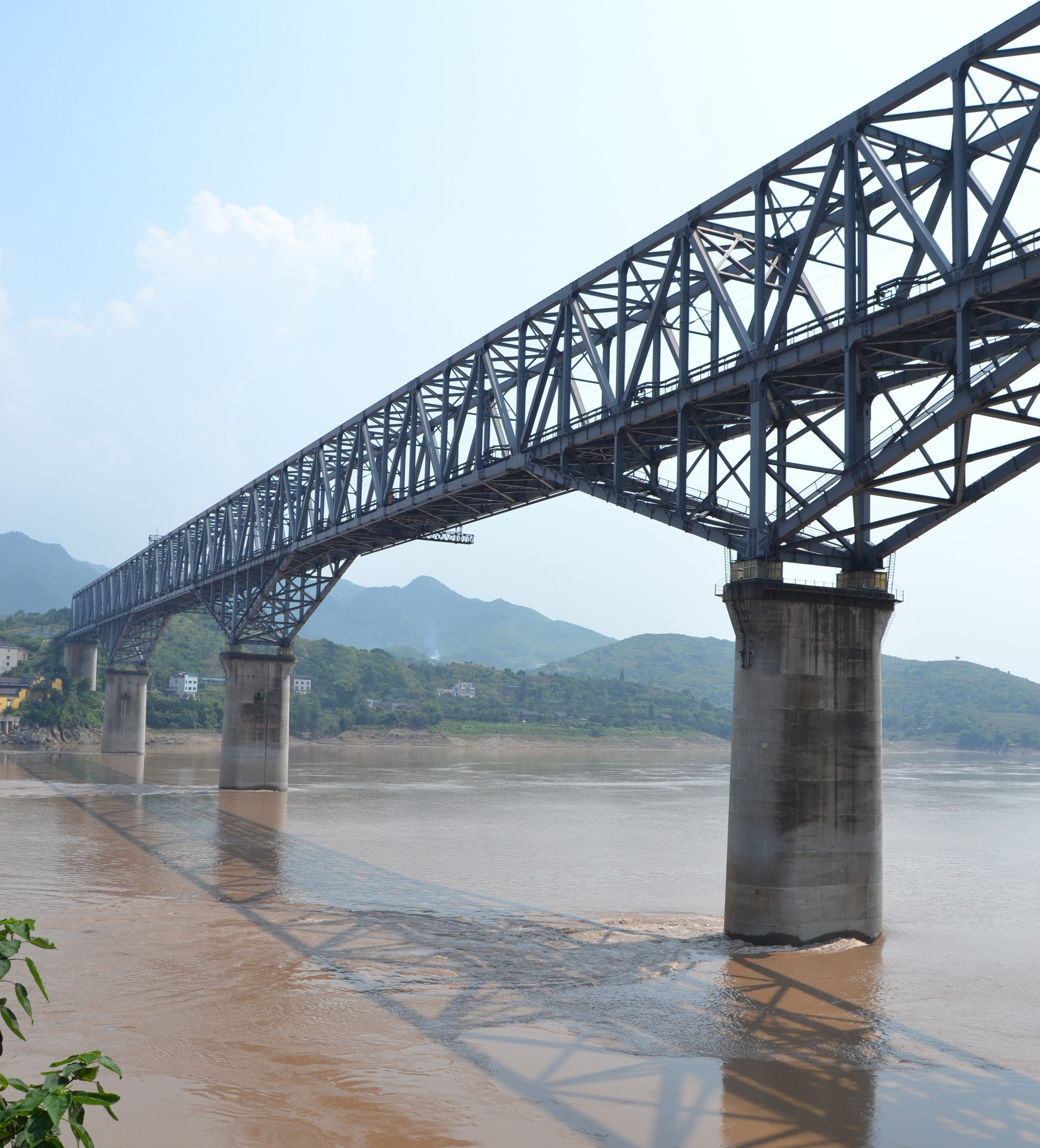
- Coordinates: 29.772796°N 106.991546°E
- Carries: Yuhuai Railway
- Crosses: Yangtze River
- Locale: Changshou, Chongqing, China

Characteristics
- Design: truss bridge
- Material: Steel
- Total length: 898.36 metres (2,947.4 ft)
- Longest span: 192 metres (630 ft)
- Clearance above: 18 metres (59 ft)

History
- Construction start: 2001
- Construction end: 2005

Location
- Interactive map of Changshou Yangtze River Railway Bridge

The Changshou Yangtze River Railway Bridge (Chinese: 渝怀铁路长寿长江大桥) is a railway truss bridge over the Yangtze River in Changshou District, Chongqing, China. The bridge was completed in 2005 and carries two track of the Chongqing–Huaihua Railway. The bridge is 898.36 metres (2,947.4 ft) long. The bridge won the 2008 Lu Ban award for excellence in engineering.

== See also ==
- Yangtze River bridges and tunnels
