= Guanshaling station =

Metro station in Changsha, China

Guanshaling station (simplified Chinese: 观沙岭站; traditional Chinese: 觀沙嶺站; pinyin: Guānshālǐng Zhàn) is an interchange station for Changsha Metro Line 4 and Changsha–Zhuzhou–Xiangtan intercity railway.

== China Railway ==
Guanshaling 观沙岭
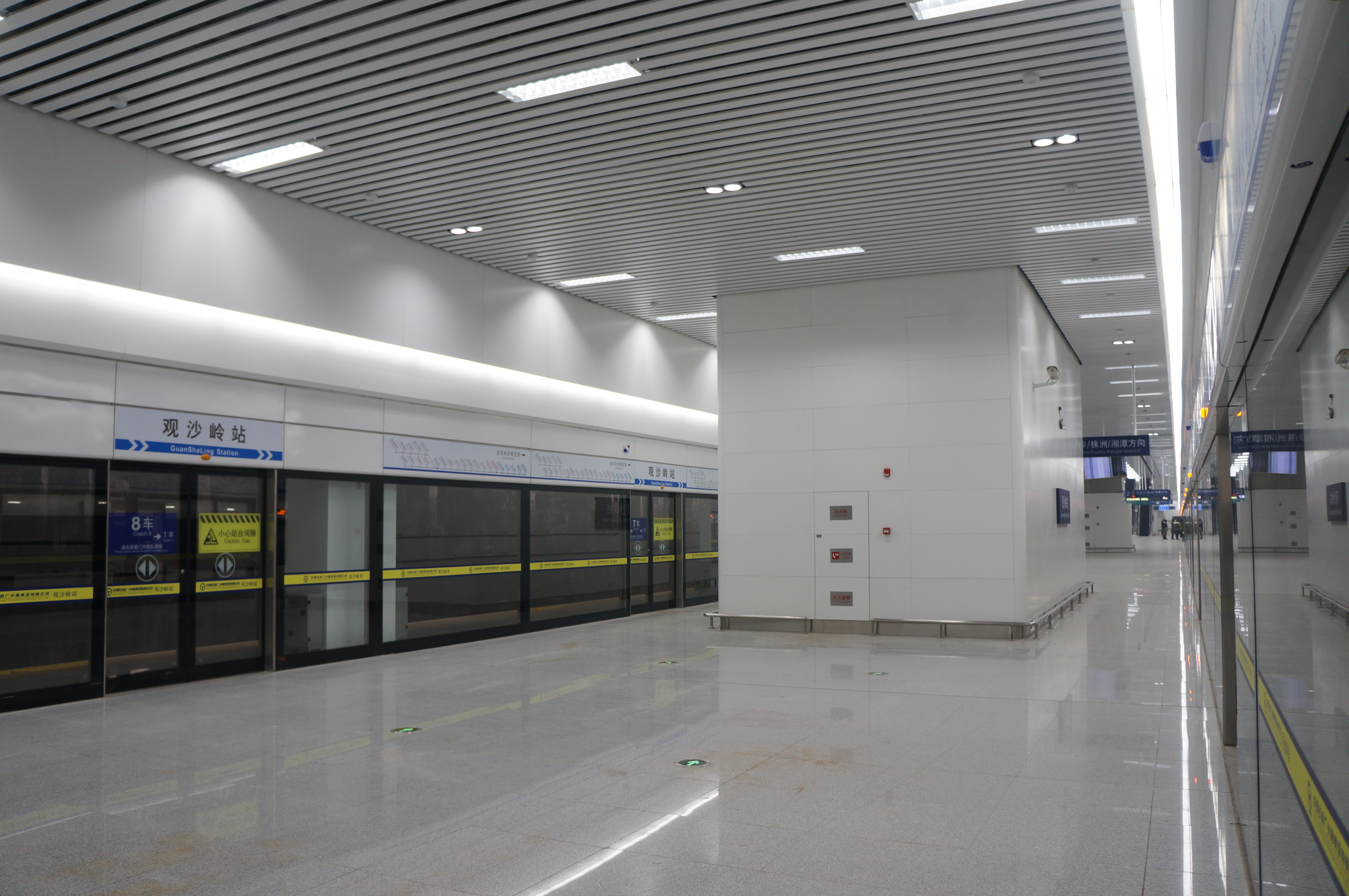
- Platform

General information
- Location: Yuelu District, Changsha, Hunan; China
- Operator: CR Guangzhou
- Line: Changsha-Zhuzhou-Xiangtan intercity railway
- Platforms: 1 island platform

History
- Opened: 26 December 2017
Location

Guanshaling station is a railway station in Yuelu District, Changsha, Hunan, China, operated by CR Guangzhou. It opened its services on 26 December 2017. Guanshaling station offers interchange to the Changsha Metro Line 4.

== Changsha Metro ==
Guanshaling station 观沙岭
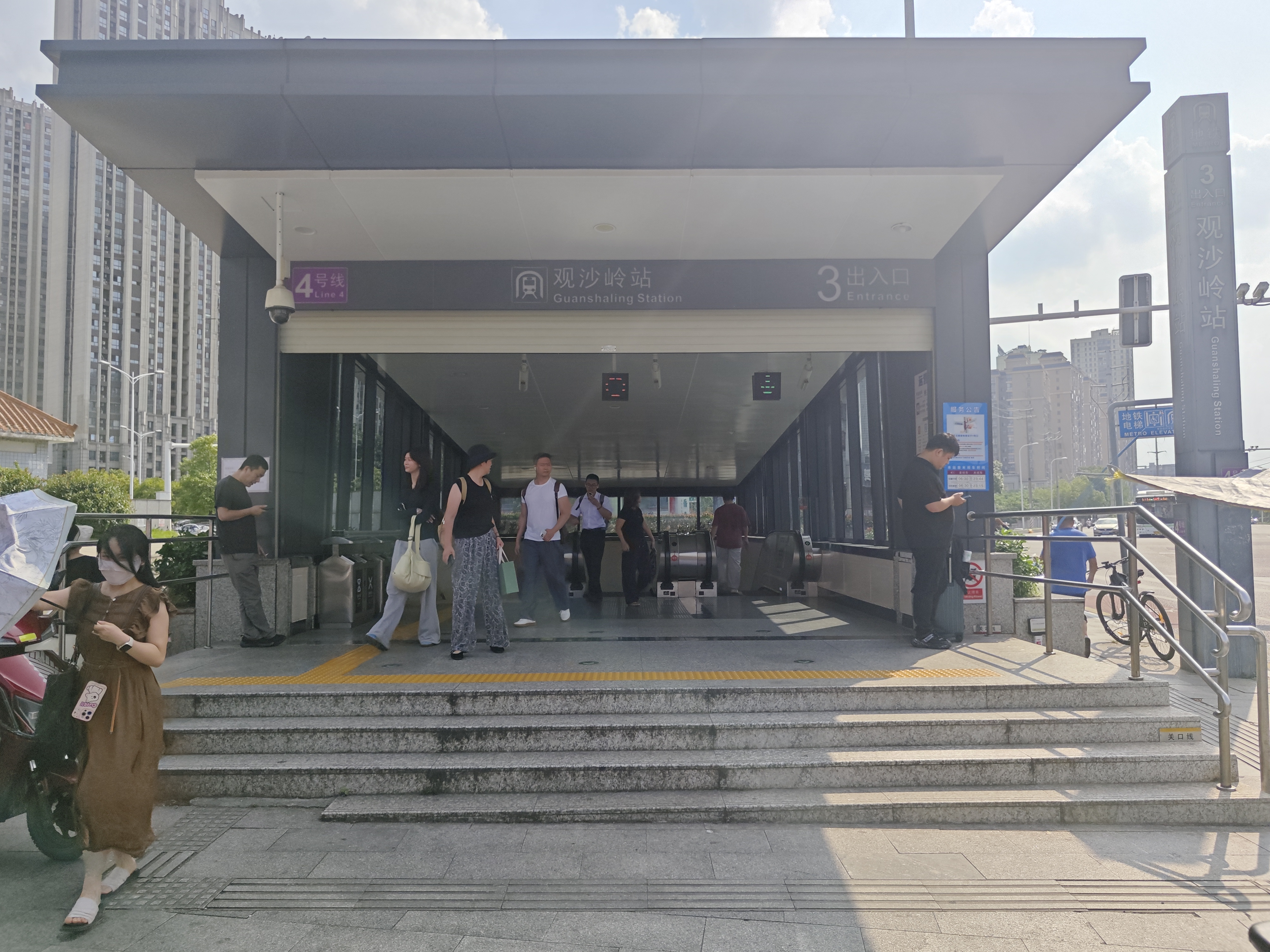
- No. 3 Entrance of Guanshaling Station

General information
- Location: Yuelu District, Changsha, Hunan; China
- Coordinates: 28°14′10″N 112°57′21″E
- Operator: Changsha Metro
- Line: Line 4
- Platforms: 1 island platform

History
- Opened: 26 May 2019

Services
Preceding station	Changsha Metro	Following station
Chazishan towards Guanziling	Line 4	Liugoulong towards Dujiaping
Location

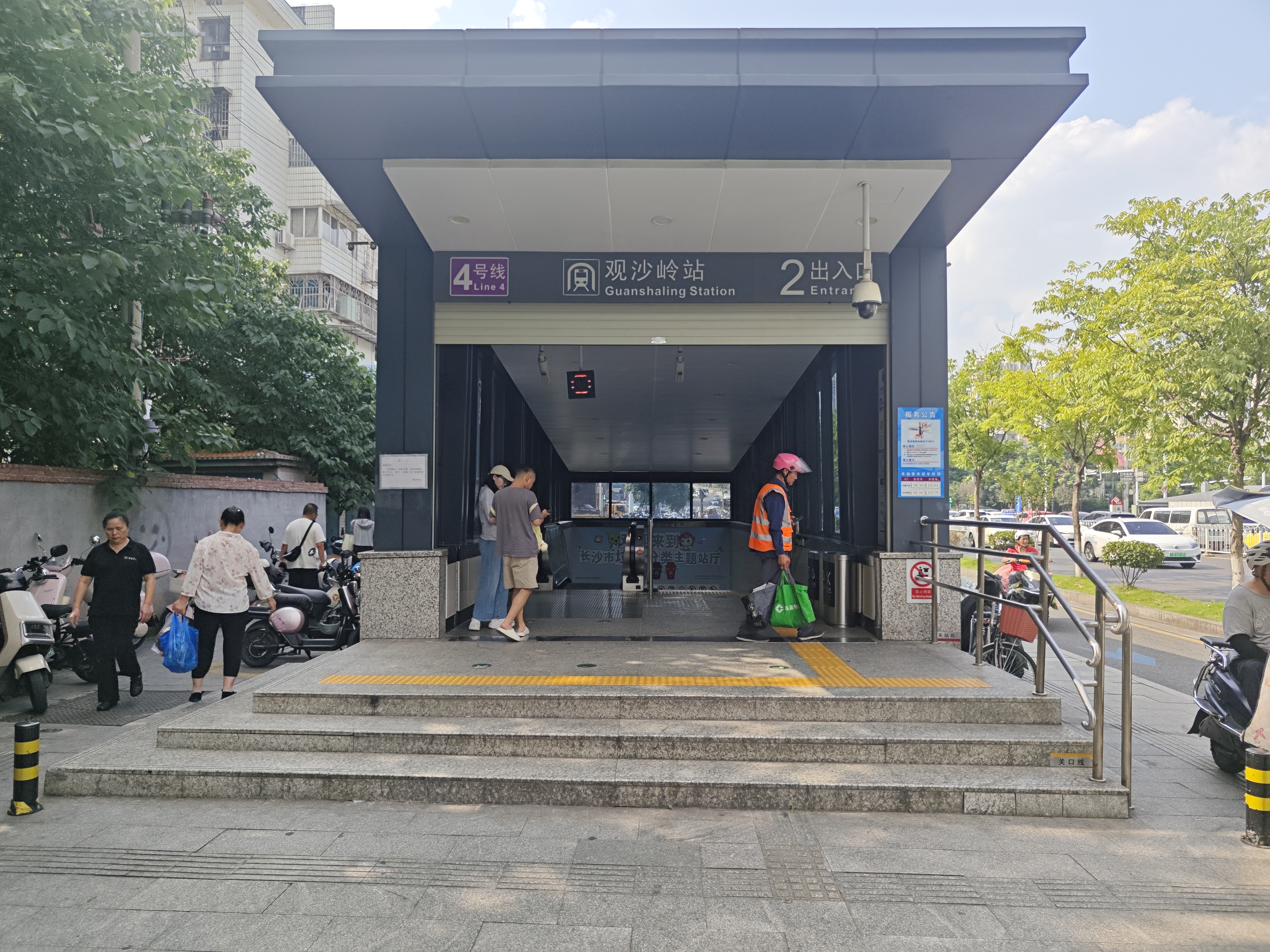
No. 2 Entrance of Guanshaling Station

Guanshaling station is a subway station in Yuelu District, Changsha, Hunan, China, operated by the Changsha subway operator Changsha Metro. Construction began on July 13, 2015. The station opened on 26 May 2019. Guanshaling Station offers interchange to the Changsha-Zhuzhou-Xiangtan Intercity Railway.

=== Layout ===
The station has one island platform.

G		Exits
LG1	Concourse	Faregates, Station Agent
LG2	←	Line 4 towards Guanziling (Chazishan)
LG2	Island platform, doors open on the left
LG2		Line 4 towards Dujiaping (Liugoulong)	→

== Surrounding area ==
- Guanshaling Park (观沙岭公园)
- Shijiagang Aquatic Park (施家港水上公园)
- Changsha Municipal Government
- Changsha Municipal People's Procuratorate
- Changsha Municipal Archives Bureau
- Hunan Provincial Writers Association
- Changsha Municipal Letters and Visits Bureau
