= Dongjing railway station =

Railway station in Changsha, China

Dongjing railway station 洞井站
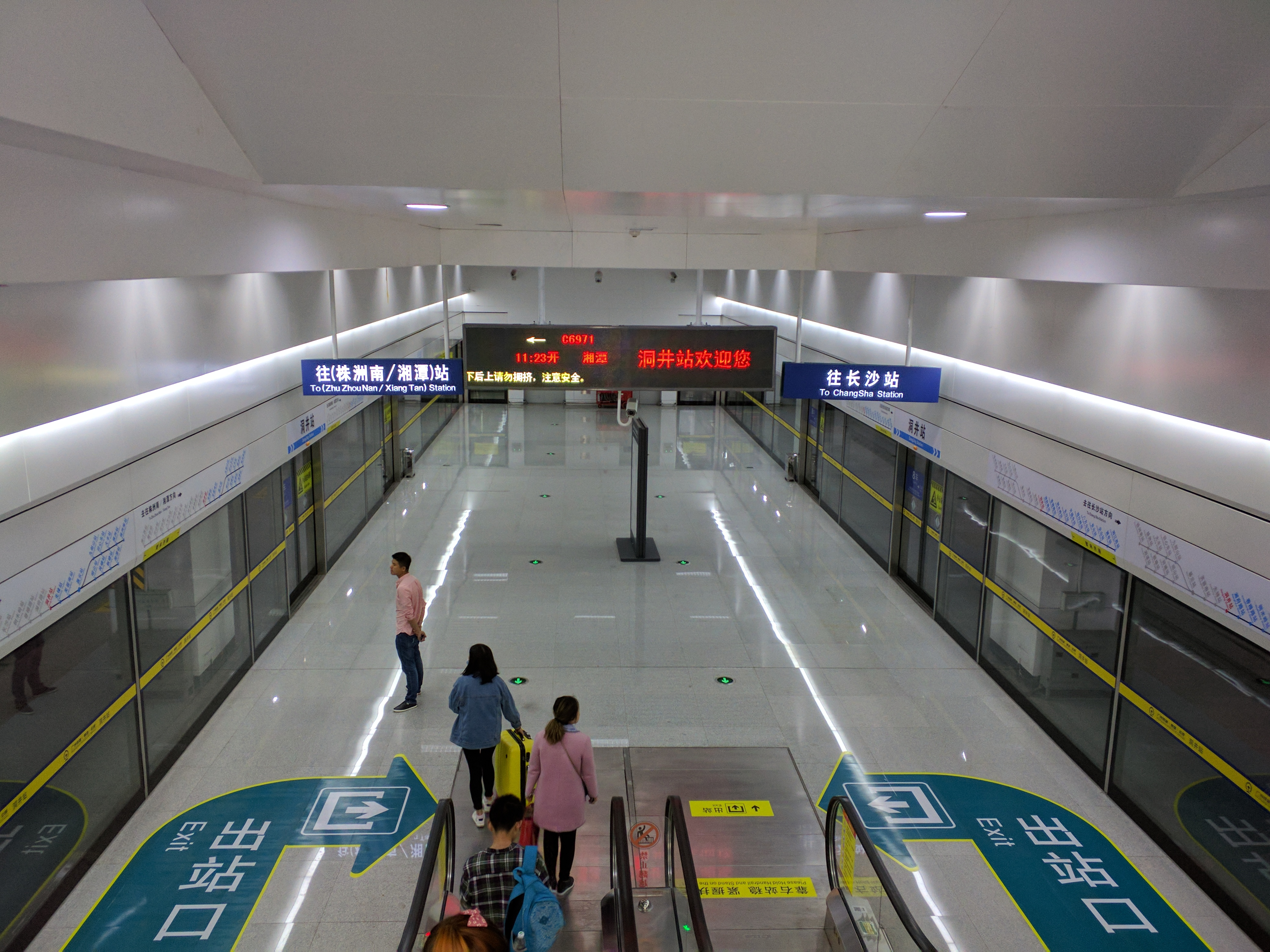
- Platform

General information
- Location: Yuhua District, Changsha, Hunan; China
- Coordinates: 28.0998°N 113.0093°E
- Operated by: CR Guangzhou
- Line: Changsha-Zhuzhou-Xiangtan intercity railway
- Platforms: 1 island platform

History
- Opened: 26 December 2016
Location

Dongjing station (Chinese: 洞井站) is a railway station in Yuhua District, Changsha, Hunan, China, operated by CR Guangzhou. It opened its services on 26 December 2016.
