= Fengyan Township =

Fengyan Township 峰岩乡
- Township
- Location in Chongqing
- Coordinates: 29°17′55″N 107°9′14″E
- Country: People's Republic of China
- Direct-administered municipality: Chongqing
- District: Nanchuan District
- Time zone: UTC+8 (China Standard)

Fengyan Township (simplified Chinese: 峰岩乡; traditional Chinese: 峰岩鄉; pinyin: Fēngyán Xiāng) is a township under the administration of Nanchuan District, Chongqing, China. As of 2020, it administers the following seven villages:

- Qianqiu Village (千丘村)
- Fengzhong Village (峰中村)
- Fengsheng Village (峰胜村)
- Zhengyang Village (正阳村)
- Jinxing Village (金兴村)
- Sanjiao Village (三教村)
- Fengyun Village (风云村)

== See also ==
- List of township-level divisions of Chongqing
