= Nanchuan, Chongqing =

Coordinates: 29°09′36″N 107°05′24″E

Nanchuan 南川区 Nanchwan
- District
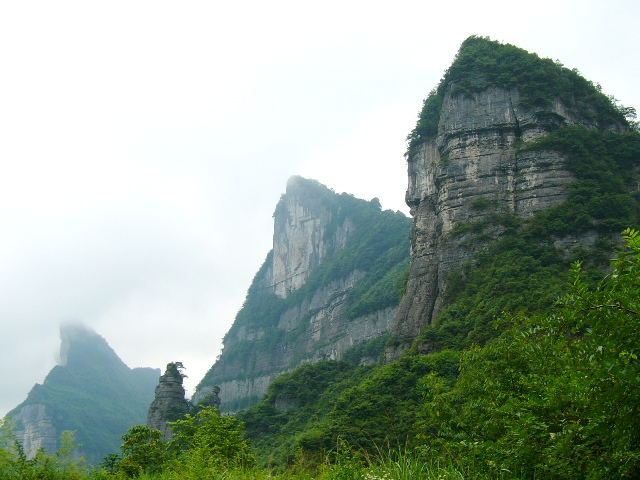
- Jinfo Mountain

- Nanchuan District in Chongqing
- Country: People's Republic of China
- Municipality: Chongqing
- Time zone: UTC+8 (China Standard)

Nanchuan (Chinese: 南川; pinyin: Nánchuān) is a district and former county of Chongqing, China, bordering Guizhou province to the south.

== Administration ==
Name	Chinese (S)	Hanyu Pinyin	Population (2010)	Area (km^{2})
Dongcheng Subdistrict	东城街道	Dōngchéng Jiēdào	84,164	108
Nancheng Subdistrict	南城街道	Nánchéng Jiēdào	80,485	208
Xicheng Subdistrict	西城街道	Xīchéng Jiēdào	40,126	70.5
Sanquan town	三泉镇	Sānquán Zhèn	13,822	191.5
Jinshan town	金山镇	Jīnshān Zhèn	10,609	110
Nanping town	南平镇	Nánpíng Zhèn	32,888	130
Shentong town	神童镇	Shéntóng Zhèn	6,781	43
Mingyu town	鸣玉镇	Míngyù Zhèn	11,934	78
Dashuang town	大观镇	Dàguān Zhèn	20,538	87
Xinglong town	兴隆镇	Xīnglóng Zhèn	20,489	76.5
Taipingchang town	太平场镇	Tàipíngchǎng Zhèn	10,208	66.4
Baisha town	白沙镇	Báishā Zhèn	6,412	37.6
Shuijiang Town	水江镇	Shuǐjiāng Zhèn	50,918	233.03
Shiqiang town	石墙镇	Shíqiáng Zhèn	6,832	37
Toudu town	头渡镇	Tóudù Zhèn	7,255	164.1
Dayou town	大有镇	Dàyǒu Zhèn	10,040	39.5
Hexi town	合溪镇	Héxī Zhèn	6,604	132.7
Lixianghu town	黎香湖镇	Líxiānghú Zhèn	5,149	37.5
Nanzhushan town	楠竹山镇	Nánzhúshān Zhèn		57.5
Shixi Township	石溪乡	Shíxī Xiāng	9,982	54
Hetu Township	河图乡	Hétú Xiāng	5,059	33
Guhua Township	古花乡	Gǔhuā Xiāng	7,221	57.7
Qingyuan Township	庆元乡	Qìngyuán Xiāng	7,407	68
Ganfeng Township	乾丰乡	Gānfēng Xiāng	5,174	34
Shilian Township	石莲乡	Shílián Xiāng	5,153	37
Lengshuiguan Township	冷水关乡	Lěngshuǐguān Xiāng	7,345	35.8
Qilong Township	骑龙乡	Qílóng Xiāng	6,249	40.36
Muliang Township	木凉乡	Mùliáng Xiāng	6,770	42.5
Yuquan Township	鱼泉乡	Yúquán Xiāng	6,532	105
Zhongqiao Township	中桥乡	Zhōngqiáo Xiāng	7,668	42.85
Delong Township	德隆乡	Délóng Xiāng	5,279	80.2
Fengyan Township	峰岩乡	Fēngyán Xiāng	6,473	44.3
Minzhu Township	民主乡	Mínzhǔ Xiāng	7,092	30.3
Fushou Township	福寿乡	Fúshòu Xiāng	8,014	42.19
Tiecun Township	铁村乡	Tiěcūn Xiāng	7,657	57.5

== Culture ==
=== Language ===
The Nanchuan dialect is similar to the accents of Chongqing's main urban areas (such as Yuzhong and Jiangbei), but there are also some local vocabulary and intonation differences, especially among the older generation.

=== Tourism ===
Jinfo Mountain: The scenic area covers an area of 1,300 square kilometers, with the highest peak reaching an altitude of 2,238 meters. It boasts a unique "karst table mountain" landform.

Shanwangping Karst National Ecological Park: Shanwangping is 1,300 meters above sea level and covers more than 10,000 mu of forest. It is the first national-level karst ecological park in China and has been rated as one of the first "forest oxygen bars in China".

=== Cuisine ===
Nanchuan Rice Noodles：Made with local selenium-rich rice and cooked with strontium-rich spring water from Jinfo Mountain, it's coated in a spicy and savory broth, giving it a chewy and springy texture.

== Climate ==
Climate data for Nanchuan, elevation 560 m (1,840 ft), (1991–2020 normals, extremes 1981–2010)
Month	Jan	Feb	Mar	Apr	May	Jun	Jul	Aug	Sep	Oct	Nov	Dec	Year
Record high °C (°F)	19.4 (66.9)	30.4 (86.7)	34.6 (94.3)	35.7 (96.3)	36.7 (98.1)	37.0 (98.6)	39.1 (102.4)	41.5 (106.7)	40.8 (105.4)	34.6 (94.3)	28.8 (83.8)	20.9 (69.6)	41.5 (106.7)
Mean daily maximum °C (°F)	9.0 (48.2)	12.4 (54.3)	16.9 (62.4)	22.3 (72.1)	26.1 (79.0)	28.4 (83.1)	32.0 (89.6)	32.0 (89.6)	28.0 (82.4)	21.1 (70.0)	16.8 (62.2)	10.8 (51.4)	21.3 (70.4)
Daily mean °C (°F)	6.1 (43.0)	8.7 (47.7)	12.3 (54.1)	17.2 (63.0)	20.9 (69.6)	23.6 (74.5)	26.6 (79.9)	26.2 (79.2)	22.7 (72.9)	17.3 (63.1)	12.9 (55.2)	7.8 (46.0)	16.9 (62.4)
Mean daily minimum °C (°F)	4.1 (39.4)	6.2 (43.2)	9.2 (48.6)	13.8 (56.8)	17.3 (63.1)	20.3 (68.5)	22.7 (72.9)	22.3 (72.1)	19.0 (66.2)	14.8 (58.6)	10.4 (50.7)	5.9 (42.6)	13.8 (56.9)
Record low °C (°F)	−3.7 (25.3)	−2.1 (28.2)	−2.6 (27.3)	4.7 (40.5)	8.5 (47.3)	14.0 (57.2)	16.2 (61.2)	16.4 (61.5)	11.3 (52.3)	5.3 (41.5)	0.6 (33.1)	−4.7 (23.5)	−4.7 (23.5)
Average precipitation mm (inches)	22.0 (0.87)	26.6 (1.05)	48.2 (1.90)	97.0 (3.82)	153.3 (6.04)	175.8 (6.92)	173.9 (6.85)	136.6 (5.38)	85.4 (3.36)	97.8 (3.85)	53.0 (2.09)	26.3 (1.04)	1,095.9 (43.17)
Average precipitation days (≥ 0.1 mm)	11.9	10.8	14.0	16.3	17.0	17.5	14.4	13.0	12.0	17.5	12.0	11.8	168.2
Average snowy days	1.8	0.6	0	0	0	0	0	0	0	0	0	0.5	2.9
Average relative humidity (%)	82	79	78	79	79	82	78	76	78	84	83	84	80
Mean monthly sunshine hours	19.4	39.2	68.3	96.3	109.4	98.0	169.9	170.4	131.1	57.5	51.1	22.5	1,033.1
Percentage possible sunshine	6	12	18	25	26	23	40	42	36	16	16	7	22
Source: China Meteorological Administration

== Transport ==
- Nanchuan–Fuling Railway
