= Changsha West railway station =

Railway station in Changsha, China

Changsha West 长沙西
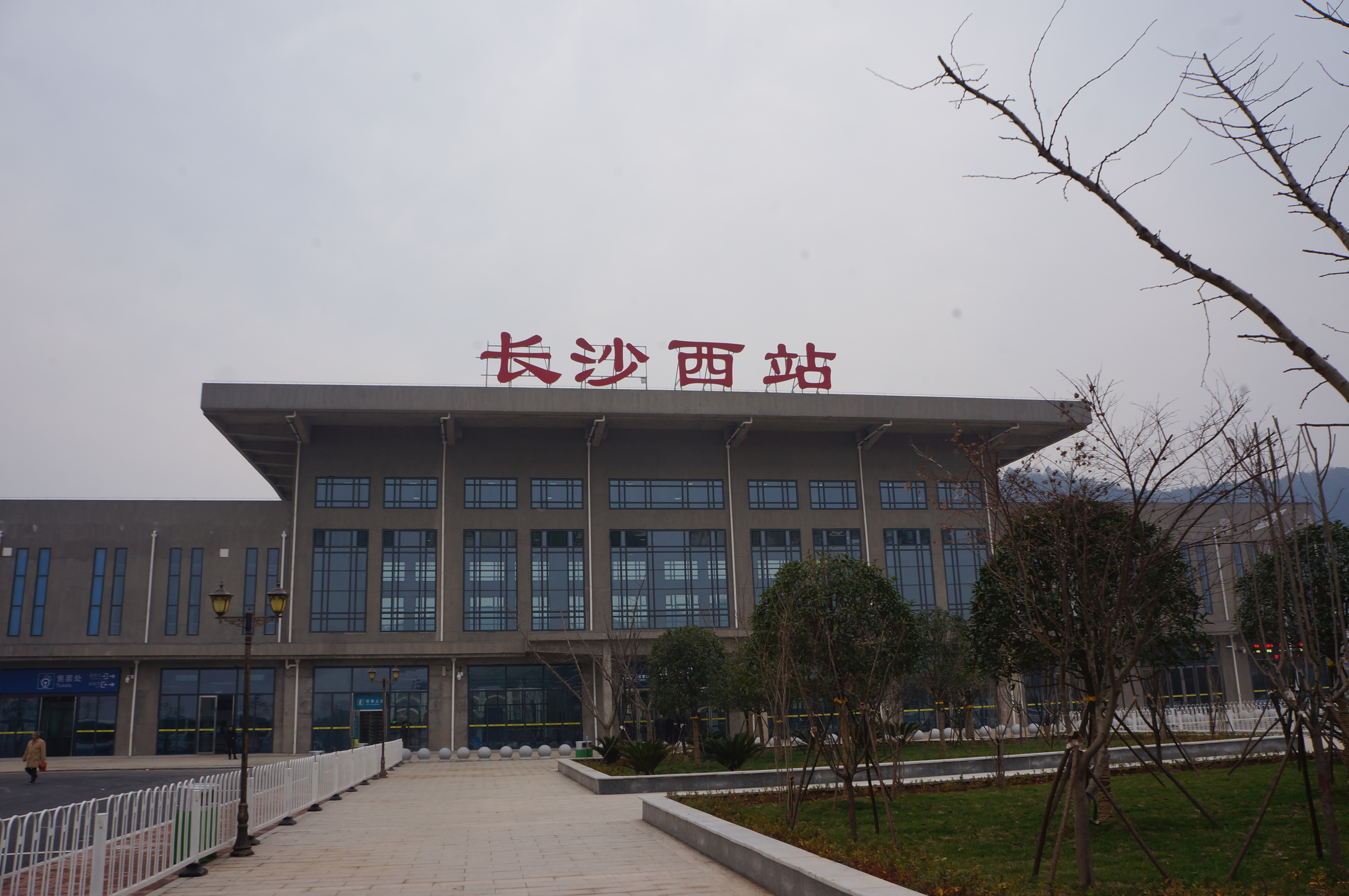

General information
- Location: Wangcheng District, Changsha, Hunan; China
- Coordinates: 28.26464°N 112.82019°E
- System: High speed rail
- Lines: Changsha–Zhuzhou–Xiangtan intercity railway Changde–Yiyang–Changsha high-speed railway Changsha–Ganzhou high-speed railway (planned)

History
- Opened: 26 December 2017
Location

Changsha West railway station is a railway station in Wangcheng District, Changsha, Hunan, China. The station is currently undergoing expansion, and is expected to reopen in 2025. As of September 2022, trains on Changsha–Zhuzhou–Xiangtan intercity railway and Changde–Yiyang–Changsha high-speed railway pass through this station to through service to each other, without stopping here.

== History ==
Changsha West railway station opened as the terminus of the western extension of the Changsha–Zhuzhou–Xiangtan intercity railway on 26 December 2017. From 8 May 2020, the station has been closed for refurbishment, and construction officially started on 25 August 2021.

The nearby Changsha West EMU depot, a depot on the Changyichang high-speed railway, opened on 26 December 2022.

== Metro connections ==
West Railway Station 长沙火车西站

General information
- Other names: Changsha West
- Location: Wangcheng District, Changsha, Hunan; China
- Operator: Changsha Metro
- Line: Line 2
- Platforms: 2 (1 island platforms)

Other information
- Station code: 234

History
- Opening: 2026

Services
Preceding station	Changsha Metro	Following station
Terminus	Line 2	Longhuling towards Guangda
Location

=== Layout ===
G		Exits
LG1	Concourse	Faregates, Station Agent
LG2		Line 2 Terminus
LG2	Island platform, doors open on the left
LG2		Line 2 towards Guangda (Longhuling) →

A planned extension of Changsha Metro Line 2 will serve this station. Three additional planned lines are expected to serve the station.

== See also ==
- Changsha railway station
- Changsha South railway station
