= Chongqing–Huaihua railway =

Railway line in China

Chongqing–Huaihua railway simplified Chinese: 渝怀铁路; traditional Chinese: 渝懷鐵路; pinyin: yúhuái tiělù
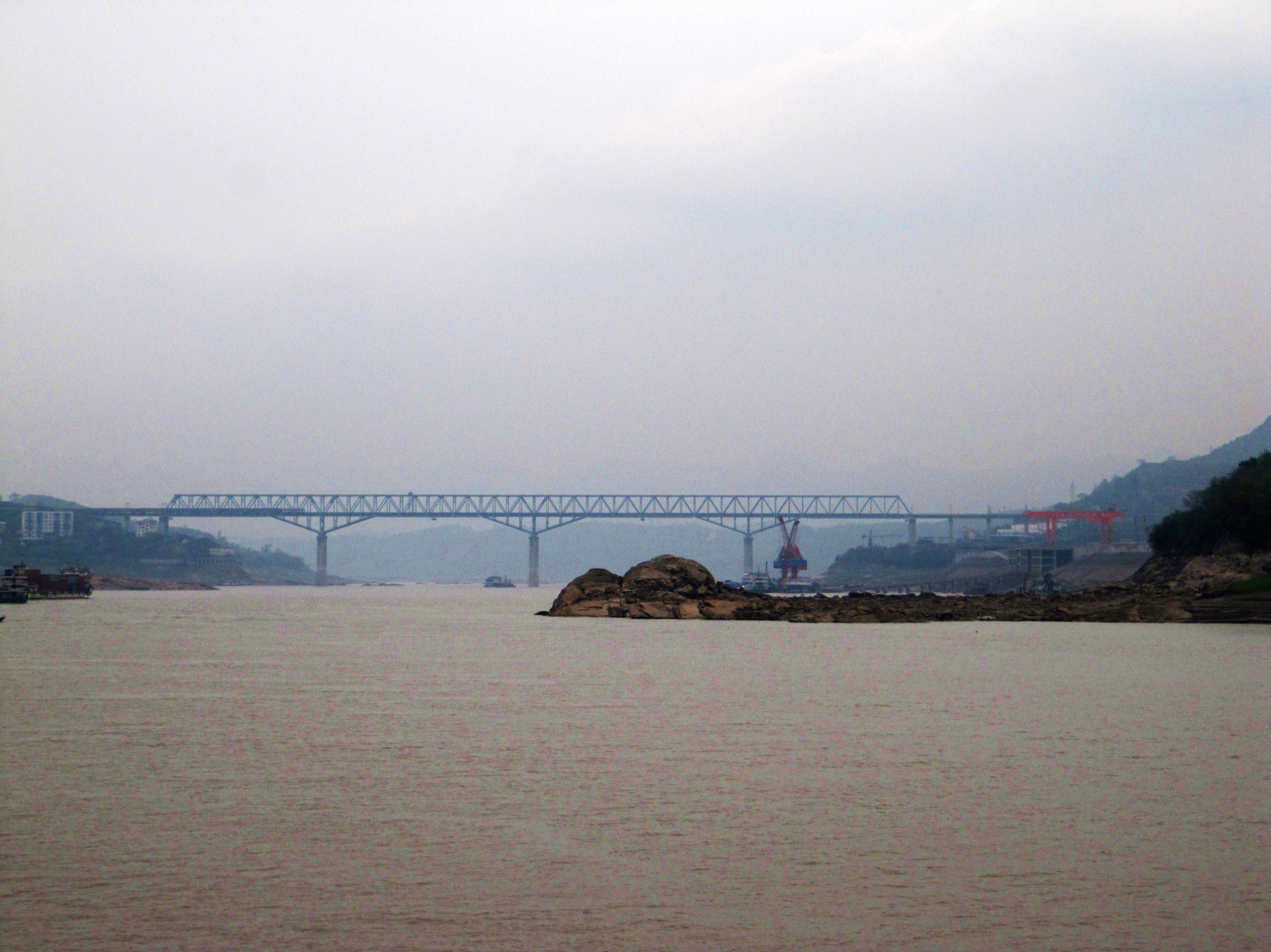
- The Changshou Railway Bridge carries the Yuhuai railway across the Yangtze.

Overview
- Status: Open
- Owner: China Railway
- Locale: Chongqing, Hunan
- Termini: Jingkou; Huaihua
- Stations: 42

Service
- Operator(s): CR Chengdu Group, CR Guangzhou Group

Technical
- Line length: 621 km (386 mi)
- Num of tracks: 2
- Track gauge: 1,435 mm (4 ft 8 1/2 in)
- Electrification: 25 kV 50 Hz AC (overhead line)
- Operating speed: 120 kilometres per hour (75 mph)

Chongqing–Huaihua railway or Yuhuai railway (simplified Chinese: 渝怀铁路; traditional Chinese: 渝懷鐵路; pinyin: yúhuái tiělù), is a single-track, electrified railroad in southwest China between Chongqing Municipality and Huaihua in Hunan Province. The line is 624.5 km (388 mi) long and was built between 2000 and 2005. Cities and towns along route include Changshou, Fuling, Wulong, Pengshui, Qianjiang, Youyang Tujia and Miao Autonomous County, Xiushan, Songtao in Chongqing Municipality, Tongren in Guizhou Province and Huaihua in Hunan Province.

The Chongqing–Huaihua railway was one of the 10 major projects in the Chinese government's campaign to develop western regions in 2000. The completion of the line shortened railway travel time from Chongqing to Zhangjiajie from 16 hours to 8 hours.

== History ==
In September 2009, construction began on a second track for the Yuhuai railway between Fuling and Chongqing. This work was completed and put into use on 28 December 2013.

Double-tracking of the entire line was completed in December 2020.

== Rail junctions ==
- Chongqing: Xiangfan–Chongqing railway, Chengdu–Chongqing railway, Sichuan–Guizhou railway
- Fuling: Nanchuan–Fuling railway
- Qianjiang District: Qianjiang–Changde railway
- Huaihua: Shanghai–Kunming railway, Jiaozuo–Liuzhou railway

== See also ==
- List of railways in China
