= Changsha–Ganzhou high-speed railway =

High speed rail line in China

Changsha–Ganzhou high-speed railway 长赣高速铁路

Overview
- Status: Planned
- Termini: Changsha West, Changsha South; Ganzhou North, Ganzhou West

Service
- Operator: China Railway High-speed

Technical
- Line length: 420.9 km (262 mi)
- Track gauge: 1,435 mm (4 ft 8 1/2 in)
- Operating speed: 350 km/h (217 mph)

The Changsha–Ganzhou high-speed railway is a planned high-speed railway in China.

The line will be 420.9 kilometres (261.5 mi) long and have a design speed of 350 kilometres per hour (220 mph). It will be part of the Xiamen–Chongqing corridor and will be completed and operational within July 2030.

== Stations ==
Station Name	Chinese	Metro transfers/connections
Changsha South	长沙南	2 4 Maglev
Changsha West	长沙西	2 (West ext., U/C)
Huanghua Airport	黄花机场	6 Maglev
Liuyang	浏阳	
Shangli	上栗	
Pingxiang North	萍乡北	
Lianhua	莲花	
Yongxin	永新	
Jinggangshan East	井冈山东	
Suichuan	遂川	
Ganzhou West	赣州西	
Ganzhou North	赣州北	
