= Nanchuan–Fuling railway =

Railway line in Chongqing, China

Nanchuan–Fuling railway or Nanfu railway (simplified Chinese: 南涪铁路; traditional Chinese: 南涪鐵路; pinyin: nánfú tiělù), is a railroad in southwest China between Nanchuan and Fuling Districts of Chongqing Municipality. The line is 79 km (49 mi) long and forms a section of Chongqing's outer ring railway. The Nanfu railway was built from 2008 to 2012.

== History ==
Construction of the Nanchuan–Fuling railway began in September 2008 and the line was scheduled to be completed in 2011. The line began freight operations in September 2012, running one to two pairs of trains per day. The line's environmental impact review was approved one year later on September 6, 2013. A number of construction related issues remained unresolved, including landslides caused by a drainage conduit built by railway workers in Pingqiao Township of Wulong County.

== Connecting lines ==
At its northern end, the line meets the Chongqing–Huaihua railway. At its southern end, it meets the Sanjiang–Nanchuang railway.

== See also ==
- List of railways in China
