= Qianjiang railway station (Chongqing) =

Railway station in Chongqing

Qianjiang 黔江站
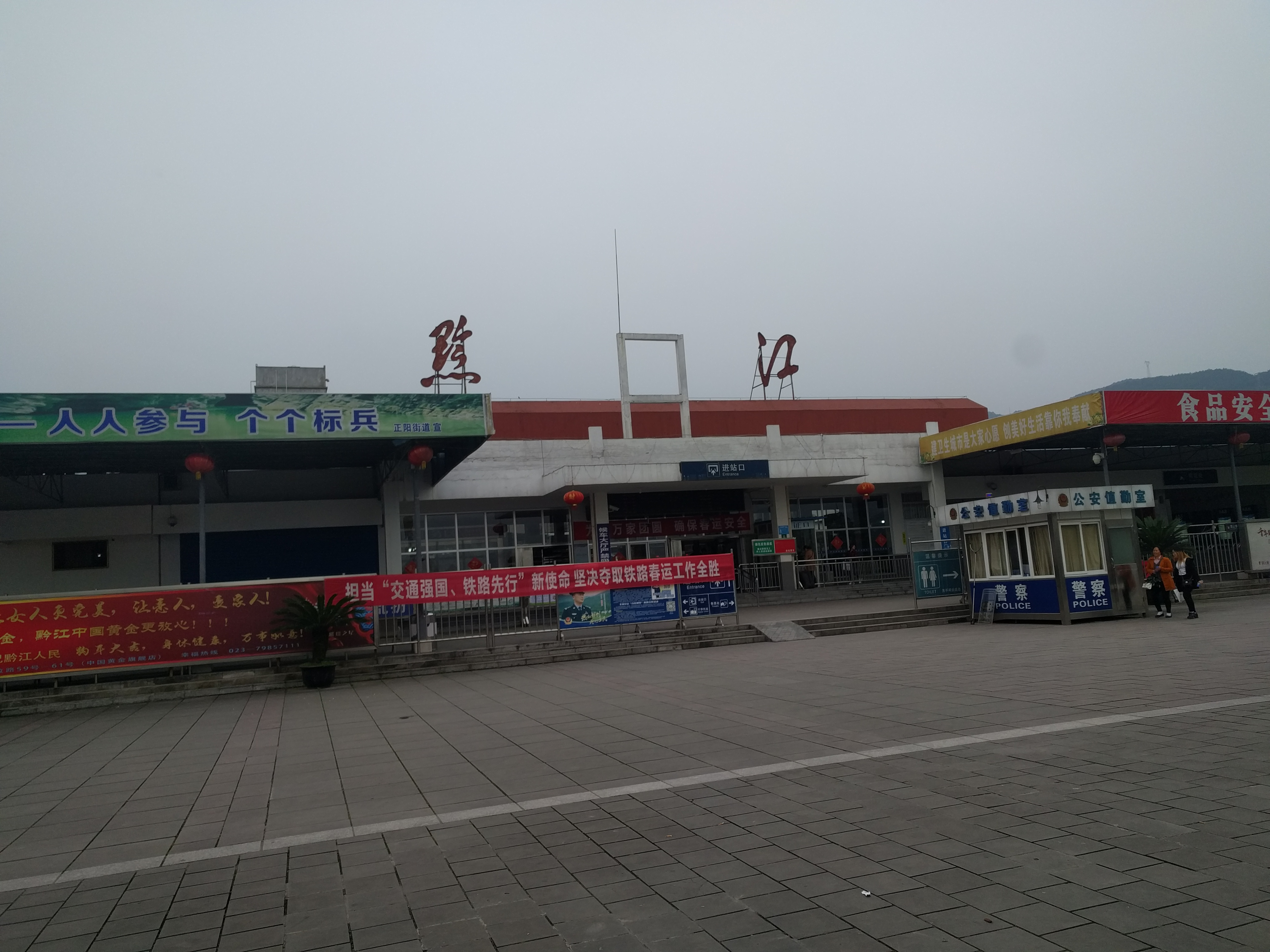
- The original station building (March 2018)

General information
- Location: Qianjiang District, Chongqing; China
- Coordinates: 29°26′43.14″N 108°47′10.47″E
- Operator: CR Chengdu Group
- Lines: Xiamen–Chongqing corridor; Chongqing–Huaihua railway
- Platforms: 8

History
- Opened: 2006
Location

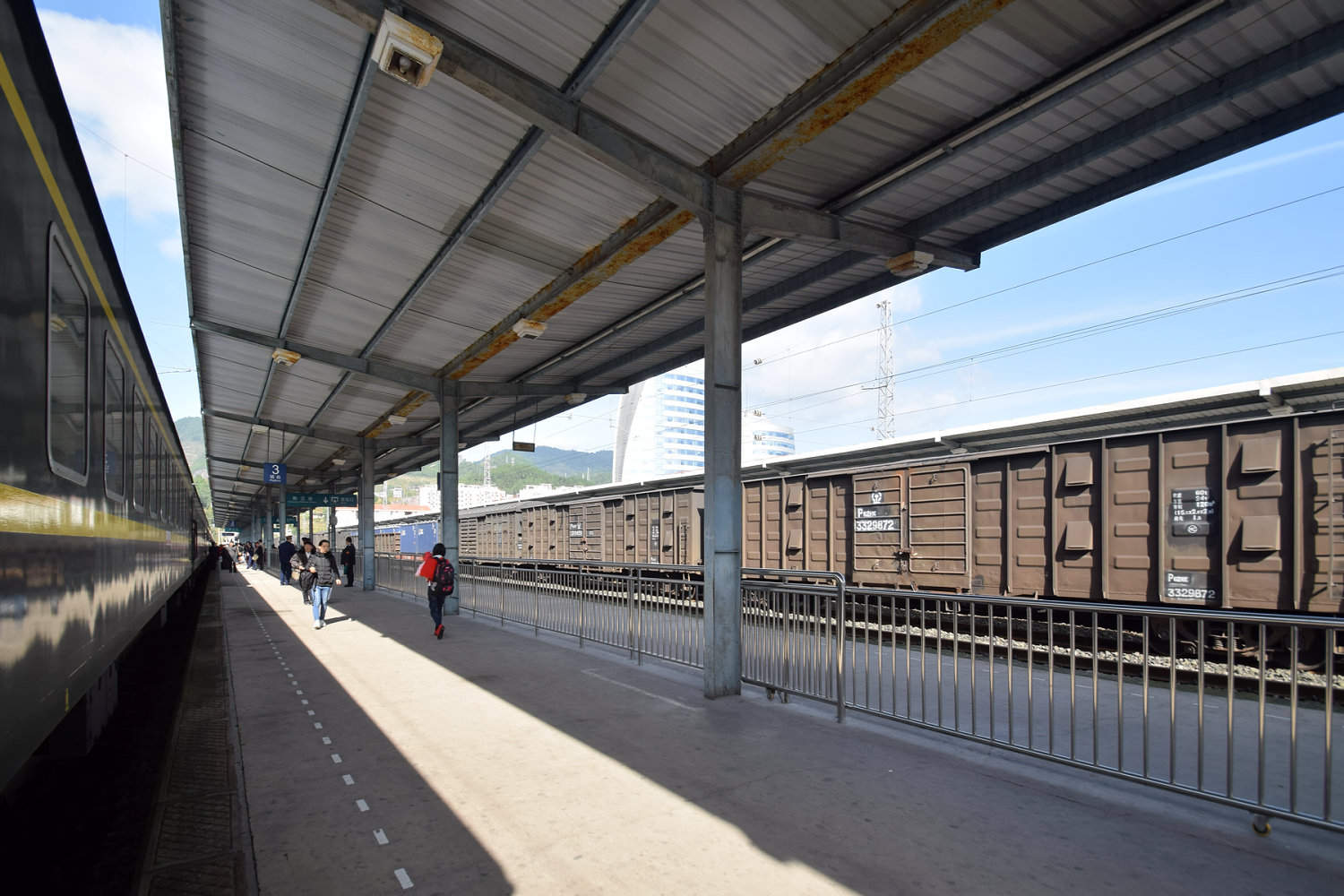
Platform in 2016

Qianjiang station (Chinese: 黔江站) is located in Qianjiang District, Chongqing, China. It is a railway station on the Chongqing–Huaihua railway and the Xiamen–Chongqing high-speed railway corridor and is under the jurisdiction of Fuling Railway Section of the China Railway Chengdu Group.

== History ==
Construction of the Qianjiang Station building started in 2000 and it was put into operation in 2006 with the opening of the Chongqing–Huaihua railway. When the new Chongqing–Xiamen high-speed railway was introduced into this station, the original station building was too small. Therefore, a new station building was built 500 m (1,600 ft) southeast of the existing station building. The new station building was put into use on 1 June 2024.

== Station Structure ==
The station building currently in use at Qianjiang station was put into use in 2024. The total building area is about 15,000 m^{2} (160,000 sq ft). It is a side-platform station building. The station area has 4 platforms and 13 tracks, divided into the Chongqing–Xiamen area and the Chongqing–Huaihua area. The Chongqing–Xiamen area has 2 platforms (4 platform edges) and 6 tracks, and the Chongqing-Huaihua area has 2 platforms (4 platform edges) and 7 tracks.
