= Xiangtan railway station =

Railway station in Yuhu District, People's Republic of China

Xiangtan 湘潭
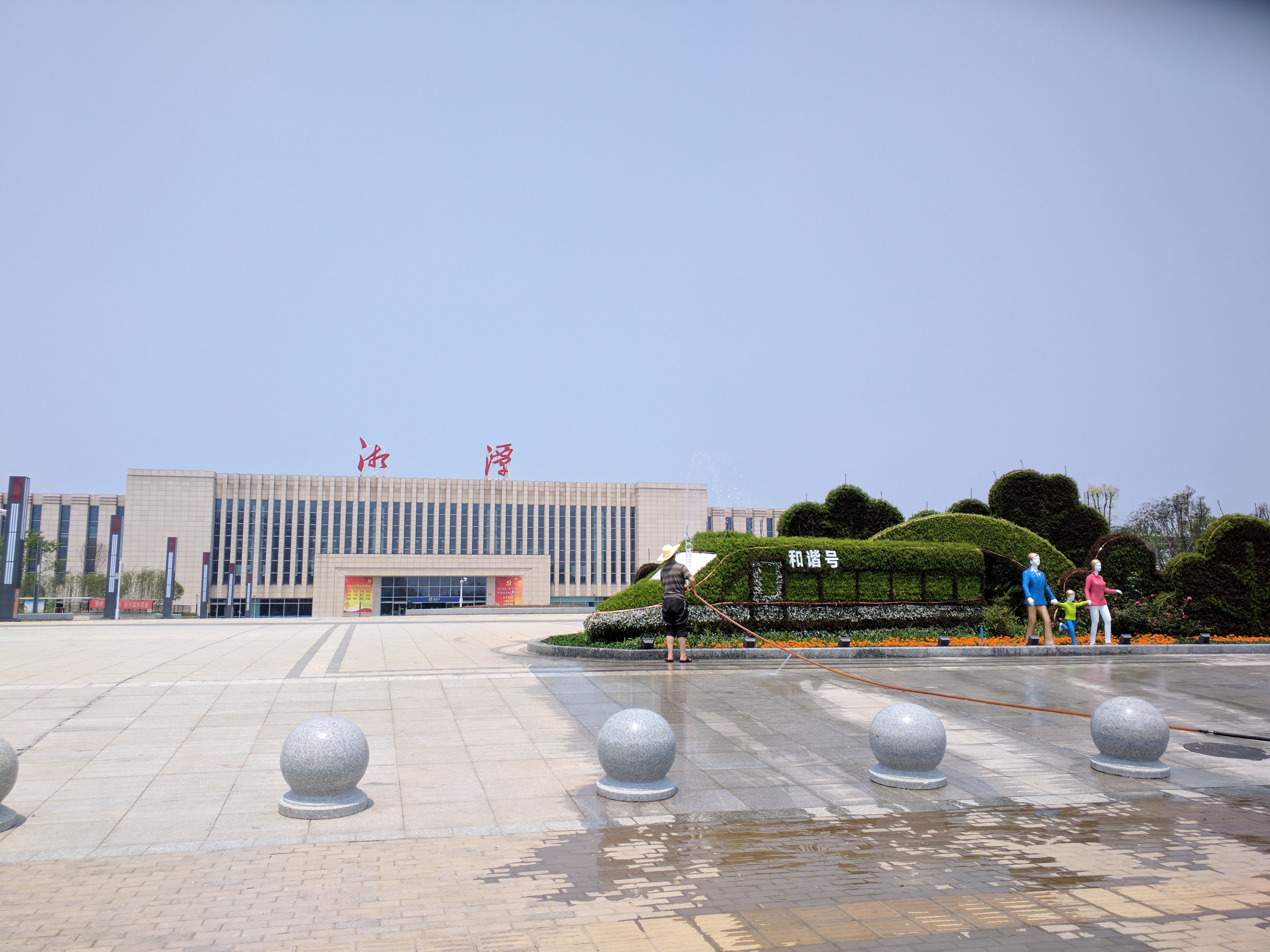
- Xiangtan railway station in April 2017

General information
- Location: Yuhu District, Xiangtan, Hunan; China
- Coordinates: 27°52′45.77″N 112°54′28.41″E
- Operator: CR Guangzhou

Other information
- Station code: 35312 (TMIS code); XTQ (telegraph code); XTA (Pinyin code)

Passengers
- 14,000 (2015 October)
Location

Xiangtan railway station (Chinese: 湘潭站; pinyin: Xiāngtán Zhàn) is a railway station of the Hukun Railway and the Changsha–Zhuzhou–Xiangtan intercity railway located in Yuhu District, Xiangtan in Hunan province, People's Republic of China. It is under the administration of China Railway Guangzhou Group. It is currently a second-class station.

Xiangtan railway station was built in 1958, and the reconstruction and expansion project was carried out in 2008. The project was completed on December 26, 2012, and put into operation.

As of December 2012, the total construction area of the station building is 20,000 square meters.
