= Shimenxian North railway station =

Railway station in Shimen, Changde

Coordinates: 29.6022°N 111.4281°E

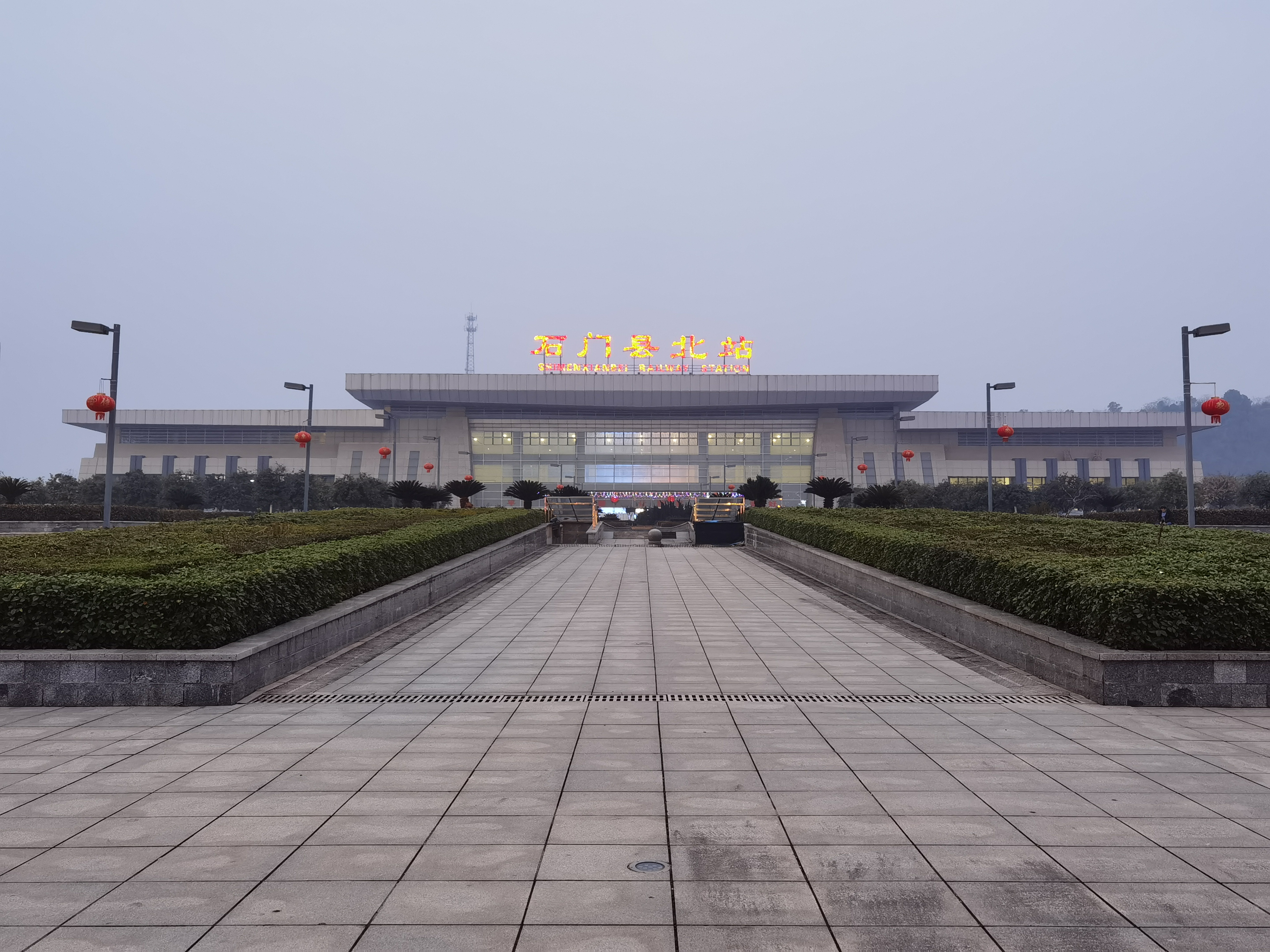
Front of Shimenxian North railway station

Shimenxian North railway station (Chinese: 石门县北站) is a railway station in Dongcheng Development Zone, Shimen County, Changde, Hunan, China on the Jiaozuo–Liuzhou railway and Shimen–Changsha railway. It was built in 1995 and was officially opened in 2013.

== History ==
The station opened on 1 July 2013.

Preceding station	China Railway	Following station
Lixian towards Jiaozuo	Jiaozuo–Liuzhou railway	Cili towards Liuzhou
Terminus	Shimen–Changsha railway	Linli towards Changsha
