= Shimen–Changsha railway =

Railway line in Hunan, China

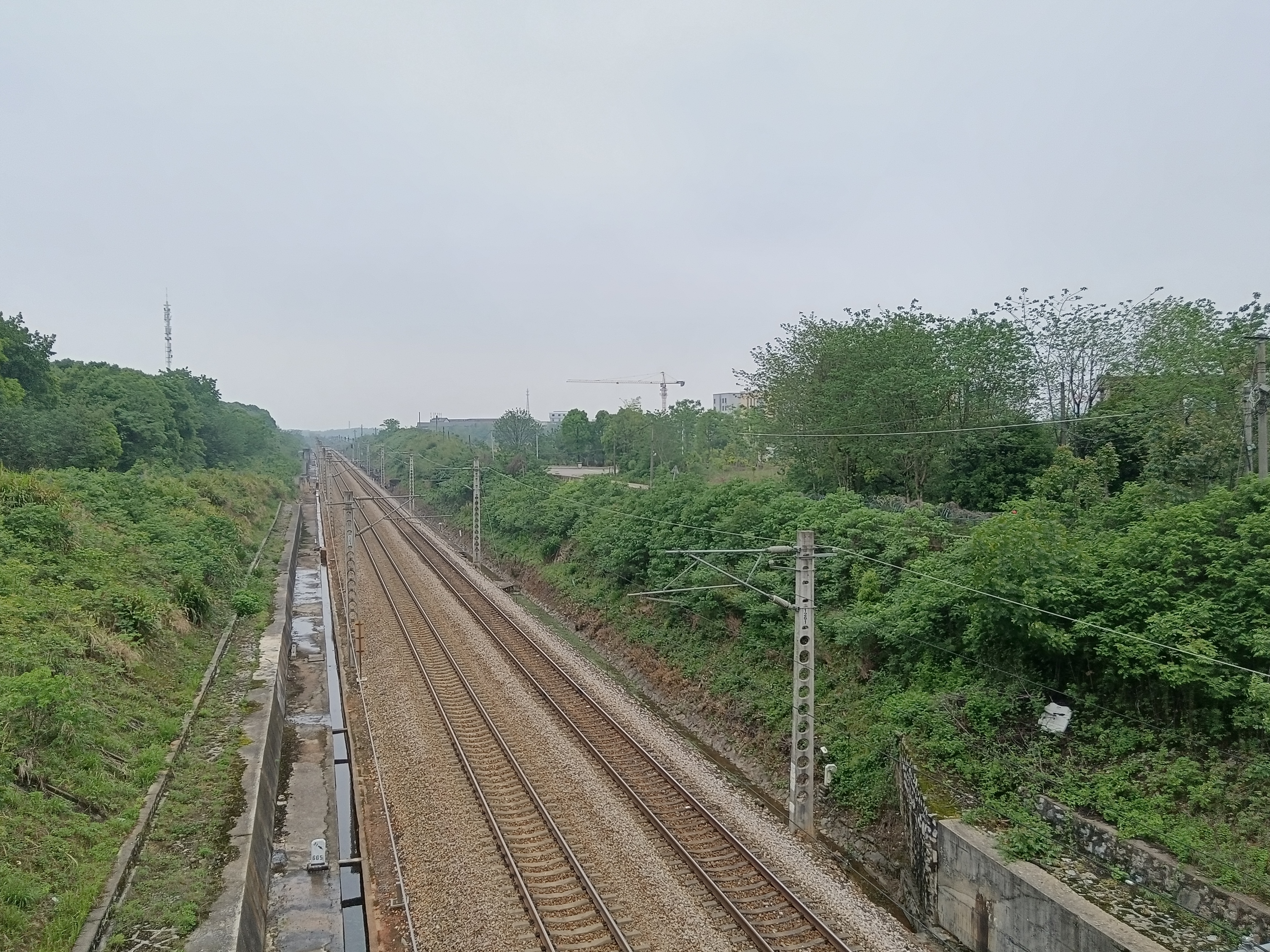

Overview
- Native name: 石长铁路
- Status: Operational
- Owner: China Railway
- Locale: Hunan
- Termini: Shimenxian North; Changsha
- Stations: 28

Service
- Type: Heavy rail

Technical
- Line length: 264 km (164 mi)
- Number of tracks: 2
- Track gauge: 1,435 mm (4 ft 8 1/2 in) standard gauge
- Minimum radius: 1,600 m (5,200 ft)
- Electrification: 25 kV 50 Hz AC (Overhead line)
- Operating speed: 160 km/h (99 mph)
- Maximum incline: 2.0%

The Shimen–Changsha railway or Shichang railway (simplified Chinese: 石长铁路; traditional Chinese: 石長鐵路; pinyin: shícháng tiělù), is a double-track, electrified railroad in Hunan Province of southern China between Shimen and Changsha. The line was originally built from 1994 to 1998 as a single track railroad with a total length of 266 km (165 mi). In 2009, construction began on a second track of 279 km (173 mi) and electrification of the entire line. The line connects Shimen, Yiyang and Changsha. The Shimen–Yiyang section forms part of the Luoyang–Zhanjiang railway Corridor.

== Rail connections ==
- Shimen: Jiaozuo–Liuzhou railway (to Liuzhou)
- Changde: Qianjiang–Changde railway, Changde–Yiyang–Changsha high-speed railway
- Yiyang: Luoyang–Zhanjiang railway
- Changsha: Changsha–Zhuzhou–Xiangtan intercity railway (connection near Wushan railway station in Wangcheng District, Changsha), Beijing–Guangzhou railway

== See also ==
- List of railways in China
