= Nanning East railway station =

Railway station in Nanning, China

Nanning East 南宁东站
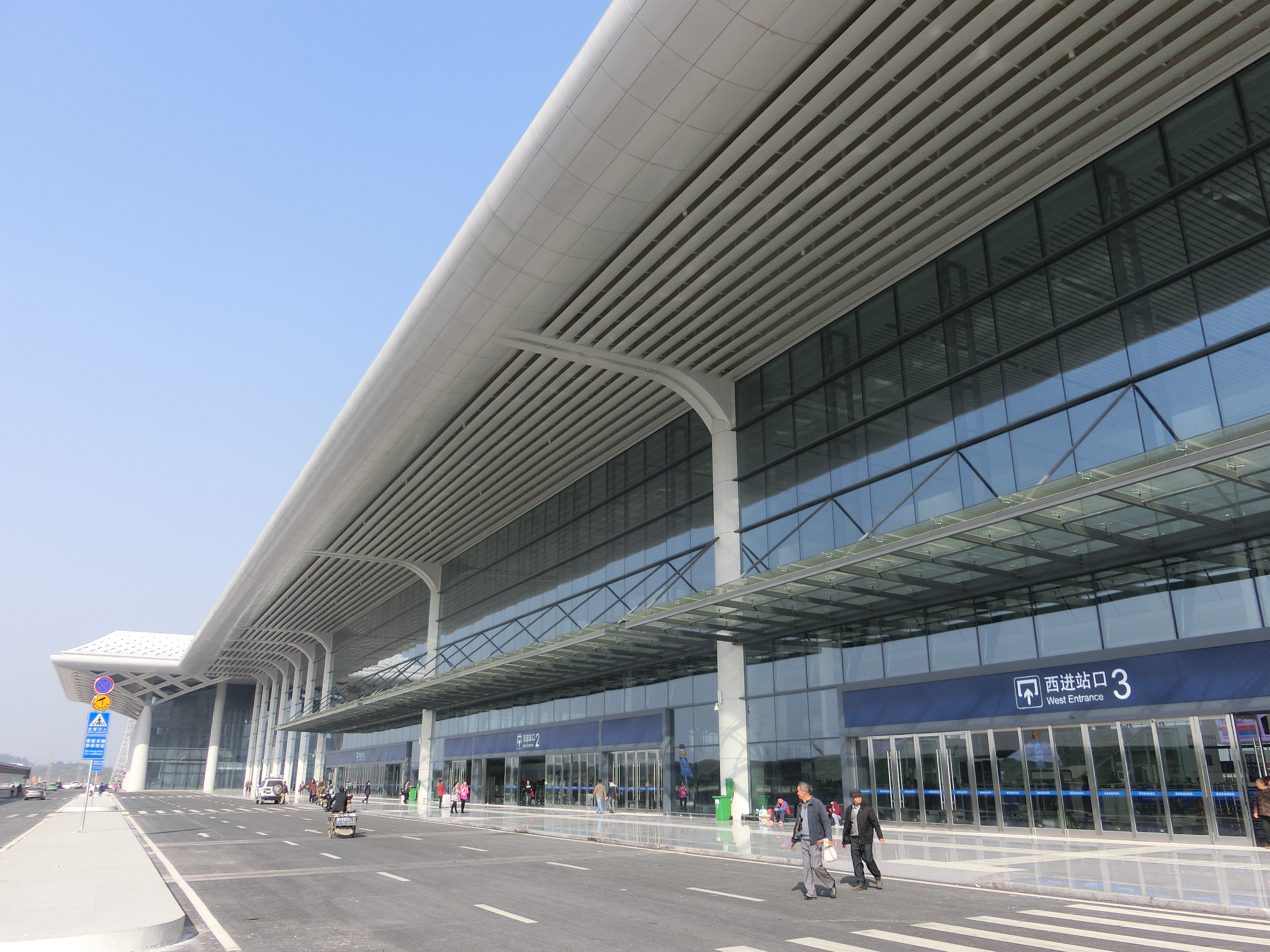
- West entrance to the station

General information
- Location: 66 Changhong Road, Qingxiu District, Nanning City, Guangxi
- Coordinates: 22°50′34″N 108°24′36″E
- Lines: China Railway: Liuzhou–Nanning intercity railway; Nanning–Guangzhou high-speed railway; Nanning–Yulin high-speed railway (u/c); Metro: Nanning Metro Line 1
- Platforms: 1 island platform (metro)

History
- Opened: December 26, 2014 (China Railway); June 28, 2016 (metro)

Services
Preceding station	China Railway High-speed	Following station
Binyang towards Liuzhou	Liuzhou–Nanning intercity railway	Nanning Terminus
Preceding station	China Railway	Following station
Litang towards Hengyang	Hunan–Guangxi railway	Nanning towards Pingxiang
Liuzhou towards Beijing West	Beijing–Nanning–Hanoi	Nanning towards Gia Lâm
Location

Nanning East railway station (simplified Chinese: 南宁东站; traditional Chinese: 南寧東站) is a railway station and metro station of Liuzhou–Nanning intercity railway and Nanning–Guangzhou high-speed railway and the under construction Nanning–Yulin high-speed railway. The station is located in Qingxiu District, Nanning, Guangxi, China. The station, located in 66 Changhong Road, was opened Dec 26, 2014. It is a transportation center of high-speed railways, regular trains, buses, metro Line 1 and coaches.

== Construction and structure ==
It has a total construction area of 251,134 square meters (2,703,184 sq ft), while some sources claim a larger area of 267,471 square meters (2,879,034 sq ft), and cost 6.07 billion yuan (988.05 million USD) to build. The main building is 48.25 meters (158 ft 4 in) tall, 415 meters (1,361 ft 7 in) long and 196 meters (643 ft 1 in) wide. The elevated platform is 150 meters (492 ft 2 in) wide.

Images of Nanning East station
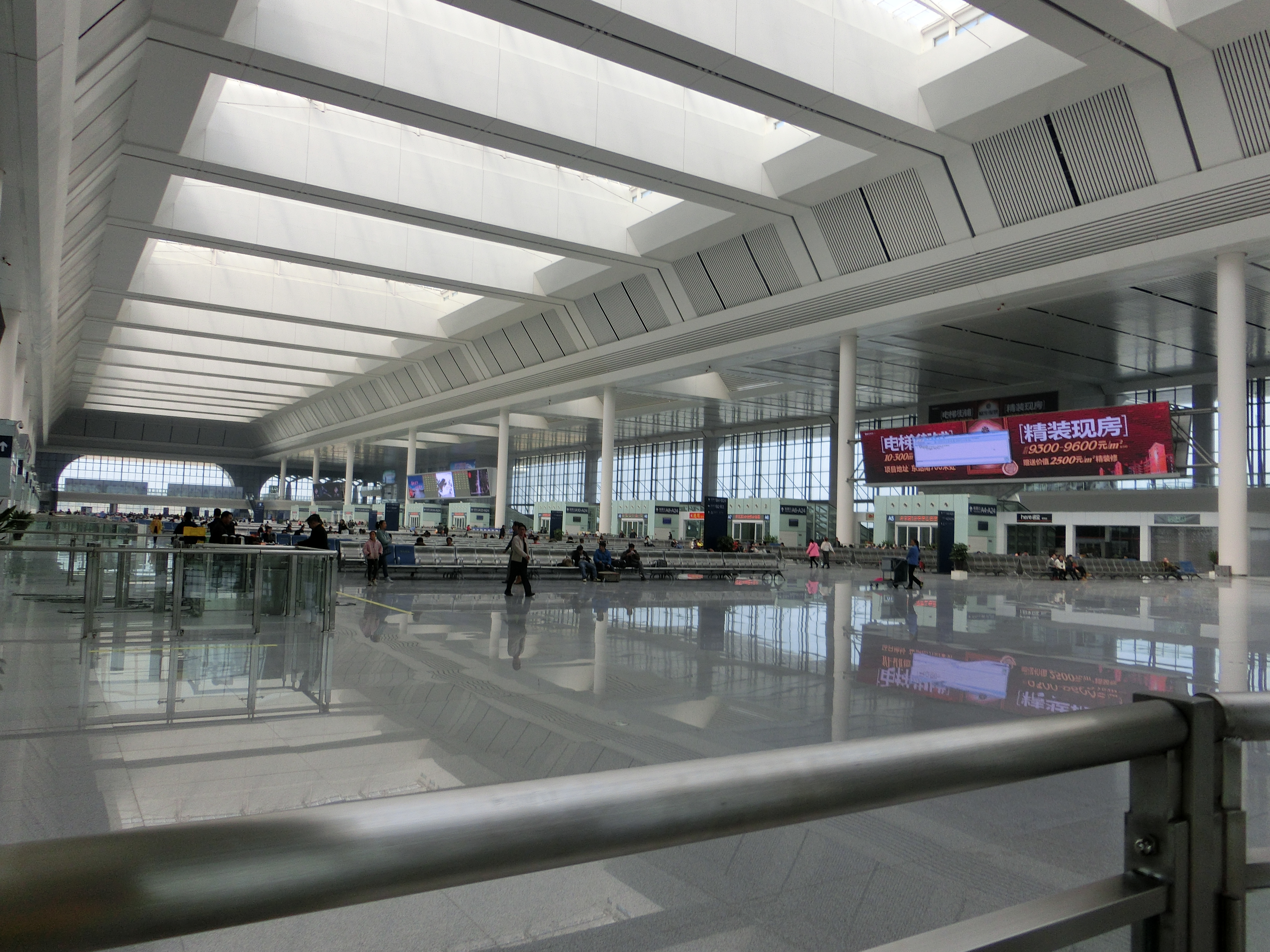
Station hall

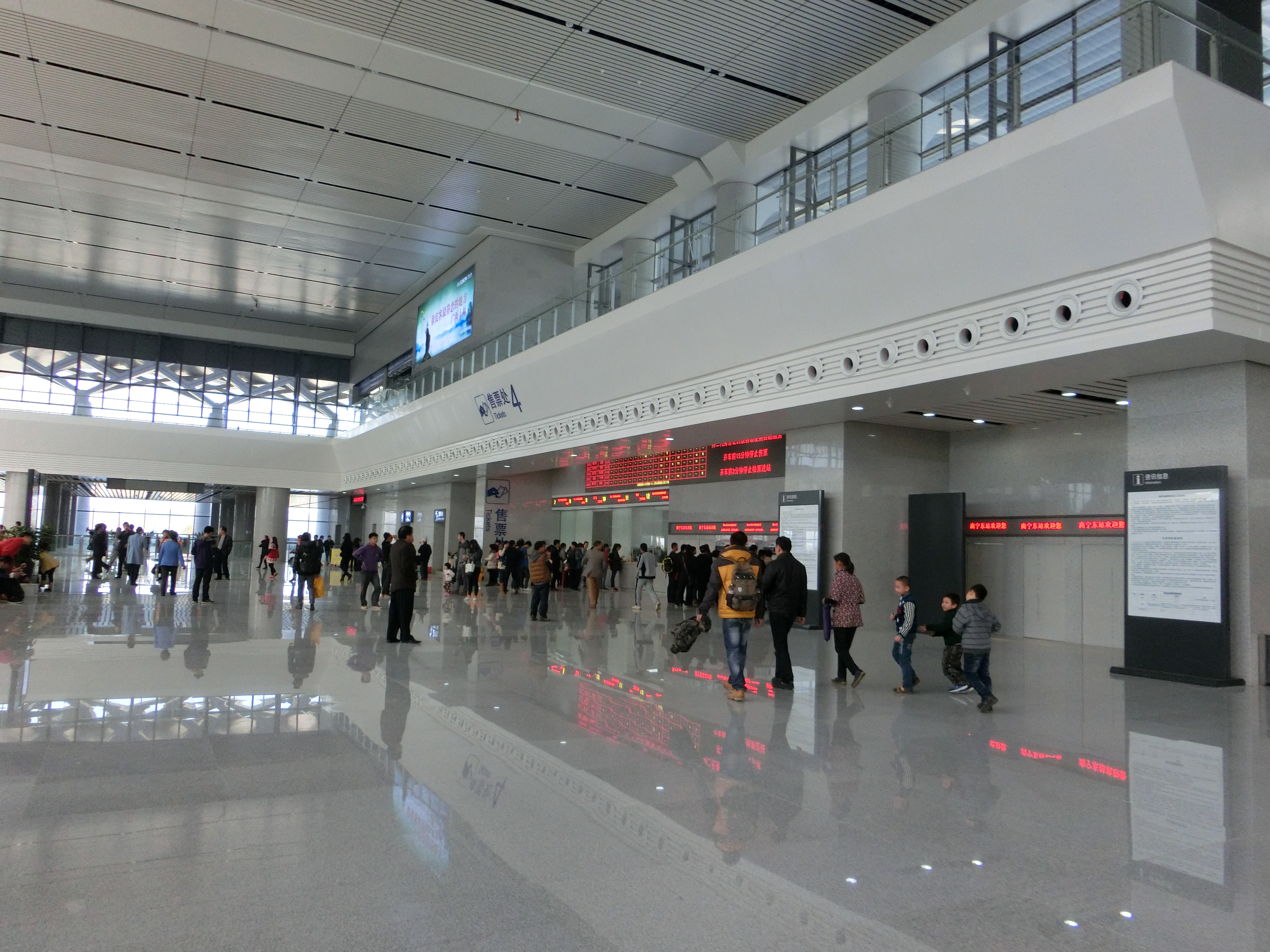
Ticket booth

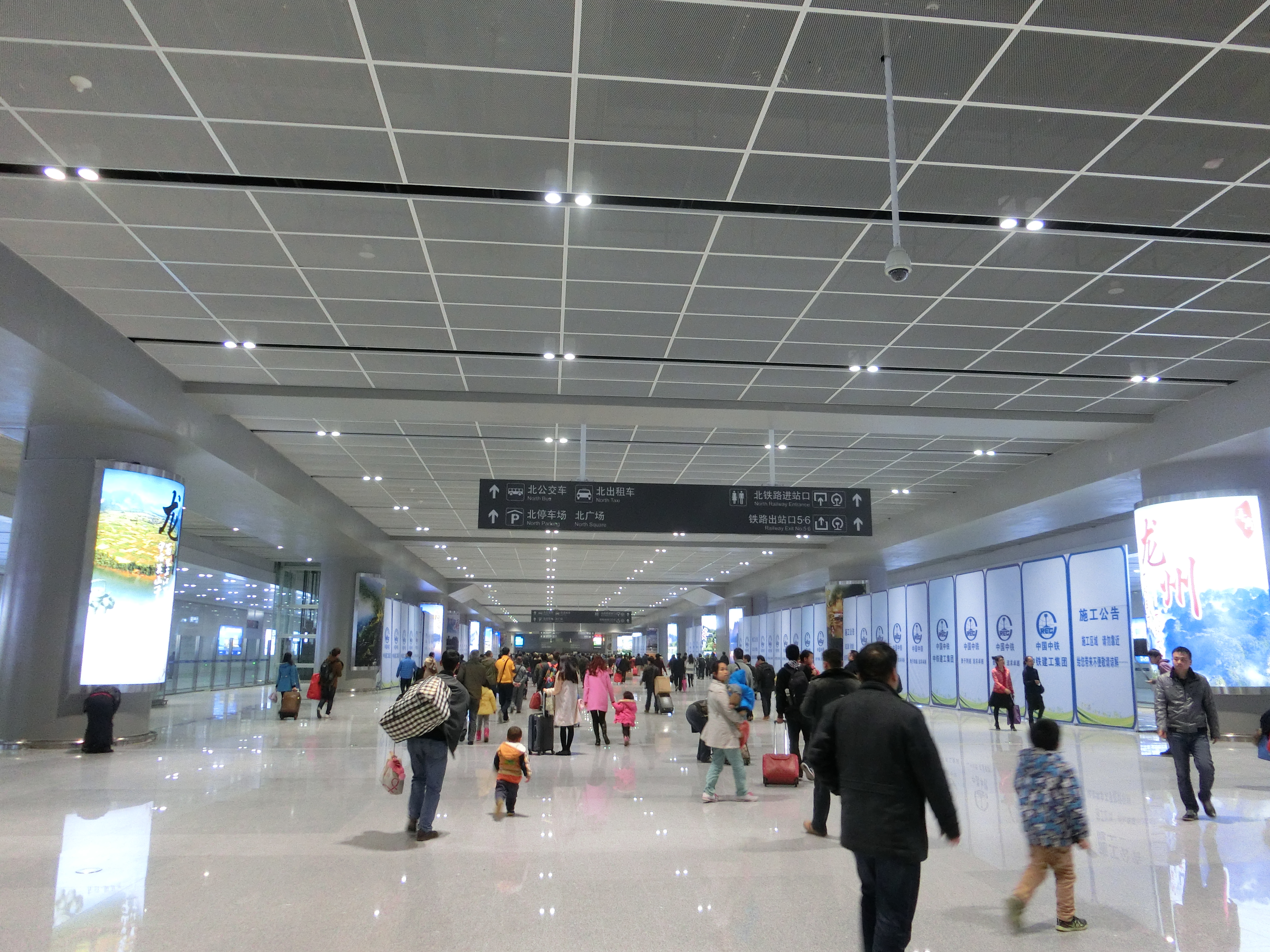
Arrivals hall

The overall shape of Nanning East Station is based on the theme of “Southern Gate, Rising Green City”. The pedestal adopts the shape of a corridor bridge, echoing the upper colonnade, which reflects the characteristics of the Guangxi veranda. The upper storey adopts a combination of triple eave roofs with different heights, which is lifted layer by layer, reflecting the characteristics of modern Guangxi's “rising by taking advantage of the potential”; the giant pillars on both sides of the north and south entrances are full and solid, supporting the central roof, showing the momentum of the “China South Gate”; the twelve pillars of the two-wing colonnade symbolize the twelve tribes of inhabitants of Guangxi; the branches on the top of the pillars stretch to form a whole, and the rhombus texture of the roof is intertwined, shaped like the crown of a large tree full of leaves. This not only shows the multi-ethnic harmony of Guangxi's solidarity and mutual aid, but also fully reflects the ecological characteristics of Nanning as a "Green City".

Nanning East station is also the most technically advanced station under the China Railway Nanning Group. It used an extensive system of steel, smart lighting design, air-conditioning, solar panels and electronic window curtains, along with natural sewage systems and energy management which can reduce the carbon footprint and fuel emissions. The construction used about 20,845 tonnes of steel.

The station building is divided into an elevated floor, a ground floor and an underground floor, with 4200 seats and four liquid-crystal displays, and has an area designated the "Liu Sanjie Nanning East Station Caring Zone" (Chinese: 刘三姐·南宁东站爱心区). A total of 90 automatic ticket sales machines were set up. The elevated floor of the station is the departure floor. Social vehicles drop off passengers on this floor. Passengers enter the waiting area after entering the station to purchase tickets. The ground floor is the platform floor, where all passengers take the train on, and the first floor is the arrival floor.

== Destinations ==
Currently, Nanning East station runs over 130 pairs of trains, mainly D-series trains which run at about 200 km/h. From Nanning East station, one can go to 11 prefecture-level cities in Guangxi and 19 other provinces in China.

Destination	Train destinations
North China	Beijing West, Shijiazhuang
South Central China	Wuhan, Guangzhou (South), Shenzhen North, Zhuhai, Hong Kong
East China	Jinan East, Shanghai Hongqiao, Nanjing South, Hangzhou East, Ningbo
Southwest China	Guiyang North, Kunming South, Chongqing West, Chengdu East, Dali
Northwest China	Xi'an North
Guangxi	Nanning, Guilin (North), Liuzhou, Beihai, Wuzhou South, Hezhou, Fangchenggang North, Yulin, Baise, Sanjiang South

== Metro station ==

Nanning East railway station currently connects to Nanning East Railway Station of the Nanning Metro, which is the eastern terminus of line 1. The connection is via exits A, D, E and F of the metro station.

The metro station (Zhuang: Camh Hojceh Dunghcan) is an island-like station in the Nanning Metro and to the south of the HSR station. It is oriented east-west and 4 storeys tall. There are 2 island platforms with one for Line 1 and one for the future Line 7 (under planning).

=== History ===
The construction of Line 1 began at 15 December 2012. After the east segment of Line 1 (Nanhu to Nanning East Railway Station) opened on 28 June 2016, the metro station began service as one of the termini of line 1.
