= Binyang railway station =

Railway station in Nanning, Guangxi

Binyang 宾阳
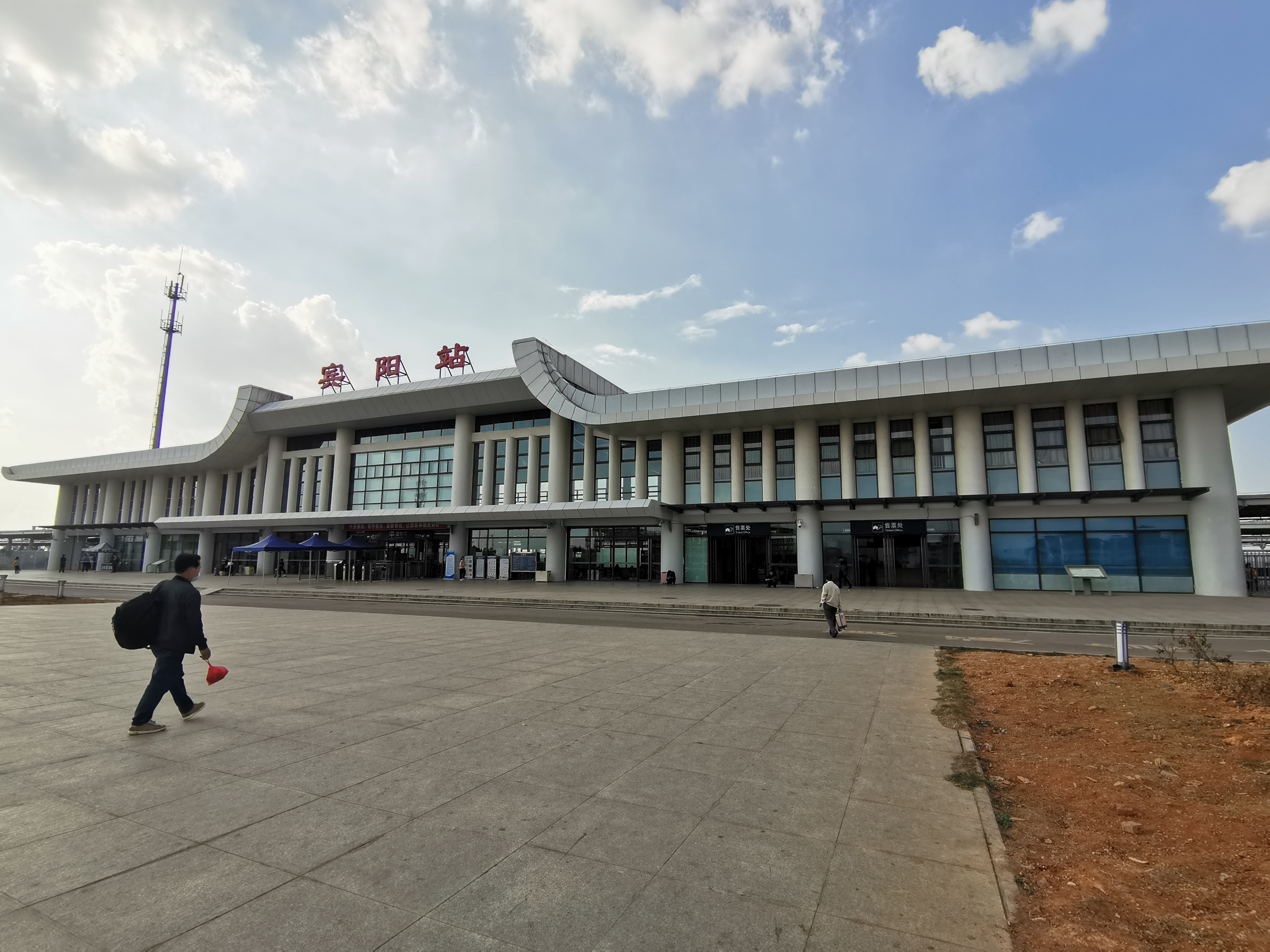
- The station building in 2020

General information
- Location: Binyang County, Nanning, Guangxi; China
- Coordinates: 23°13′10.31″N 109°5′16.47″E
- Line(s): Nanning–Guangzhou high-speed railway; Liuzhou–Nanning intercity railway
- Platforms: 4
Location

Binyang railway station (Chinese: 宾阳站) is a railway station in Binyang County, Nanning, Guangxi, China. It is an intermediate stop on the Nanning–Guangzhou high-speed railway and the Liuzhou–Nanning intercity railway. During construction, the name of the station was Litang West (Chinese: 黎塘西). Its name was changed to Binyang prior to opening. It opened on 6 March 2015. In April 2020, work began to increase the size of the station building. The new building was opened on 31 December 2020.

The station has two side platforms and an island platform, with a total of four platform faces.

Preceding station	China Railway High-speed	Following station
Nanning East towards Nanning	Nanning–Guangzhou high-speed railway	Guigang towards Guangzhou South
Laibin North towards Liuzhou	Liuzhou–Nanning intercity railway	Nanning East towards Nanning
