= Guigang railway station =

Railway station in Guigang, China

Guigang 贵港
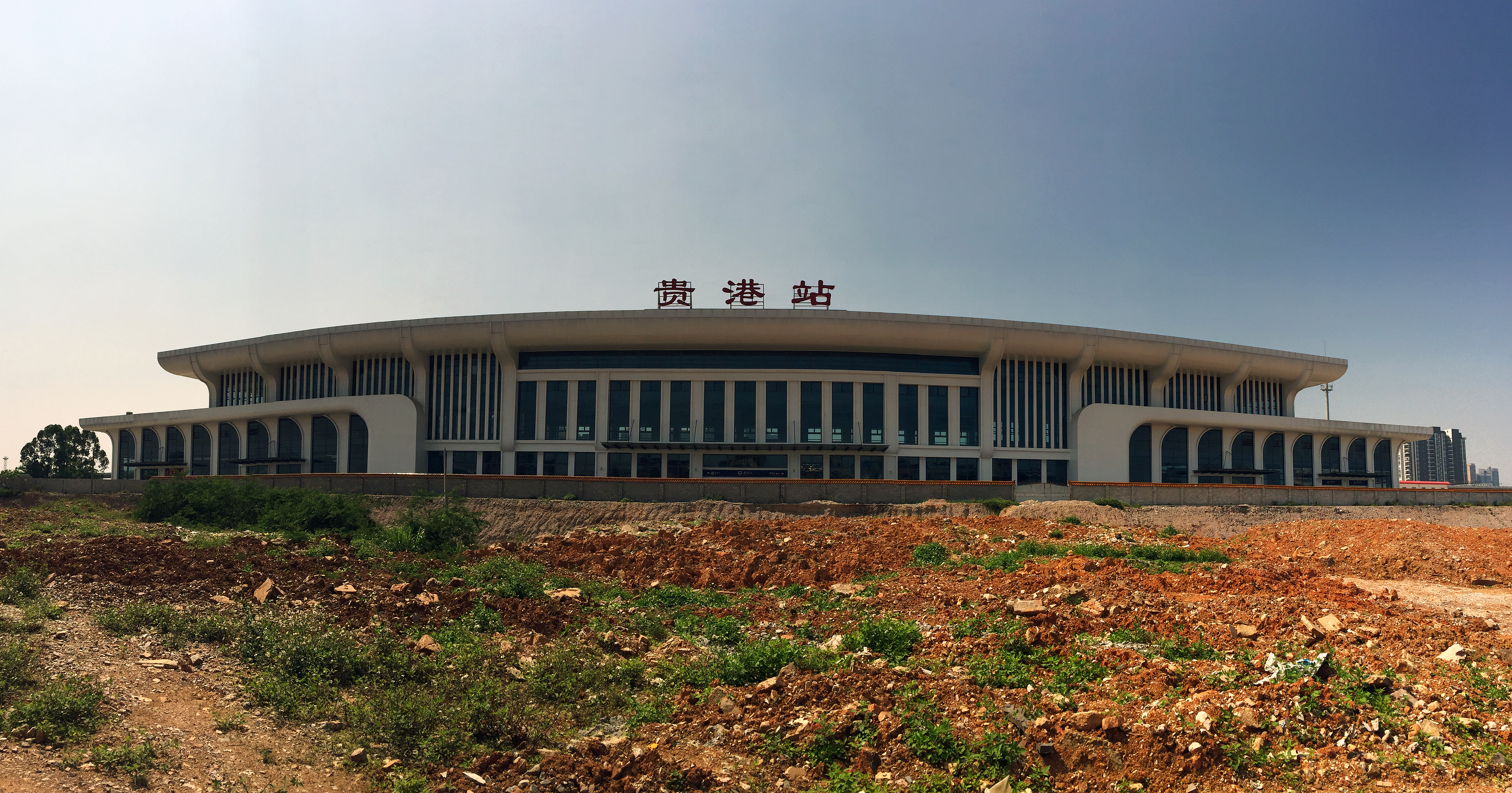

General information
- Location: Gangbei District, Guigang, Guangxi; China
- Coordinates: 23.1037°N 109.6089°E
- Line(s): Litang–Zhanjiang railway Nanning–Guangzhou high-speed railway

History
- Opened: 1 July 1956

Guigang railway station (Chinese: 贵港站) is a railway station located in Gangbei District, Guigang, Guangxi, China.

== History ==
The station opened on 1 July 1956. On 6 January 2011, a new cargo station opened.

Preceding station	China Railway High-speed	Following station
Litang Terminus	Litang–Zhanjiang railway	Xingye towards Zhanjiang
Binyang towards Nanning	Nanning–Guangzhou high-speed railway	Guiping towards Guangzhou South
