= Beijing–Nanning–Hanoi through train =

Railway line in China and Vietnam

Z5/6–T8701/2 Liu Sanjie (The Singing Fairy)
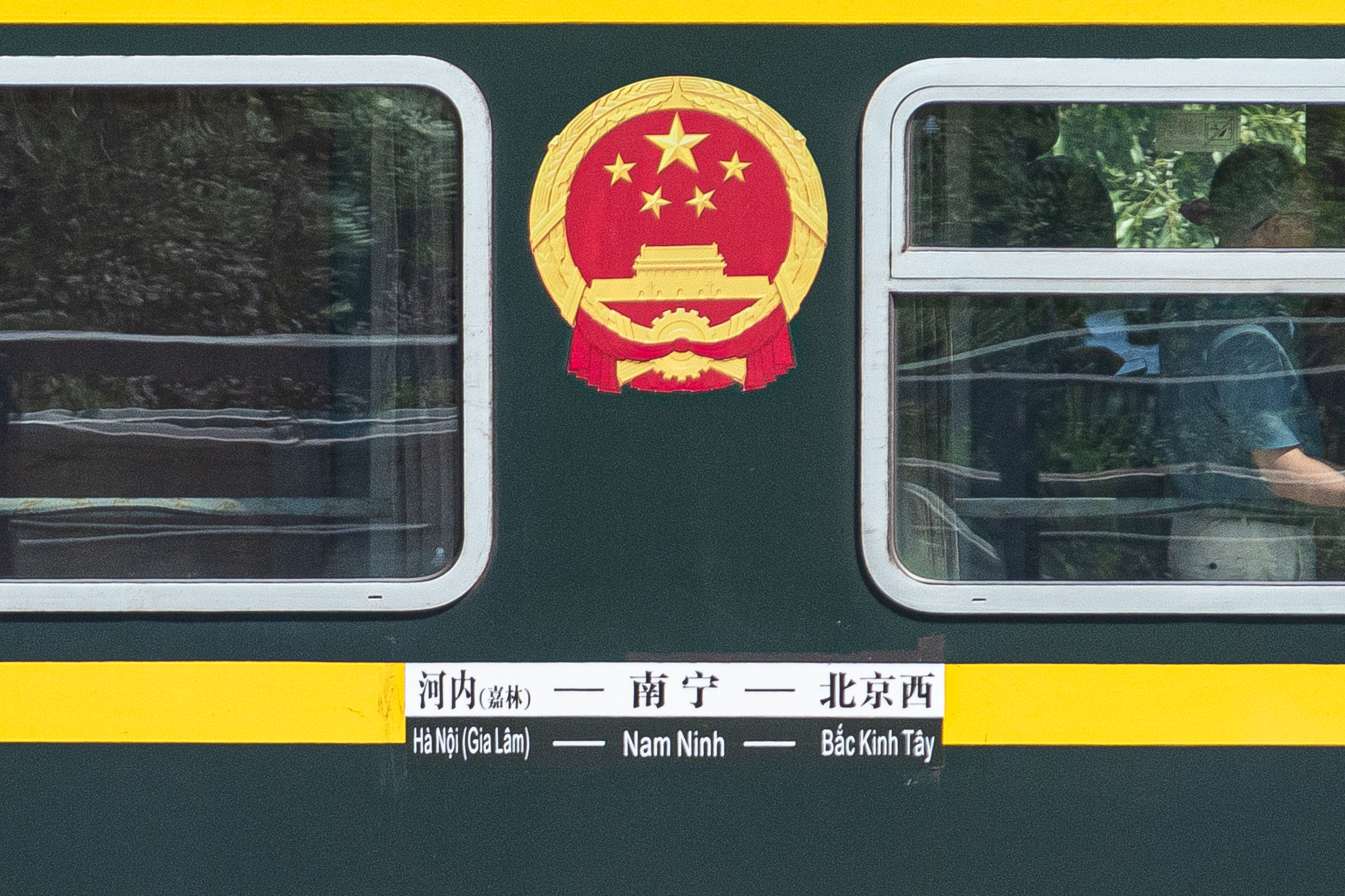
- The destination board of the Z5/6 train

Overview
- Service type: International rail service
- Locale: China, Vietnam
- Current operator: China Railway

Route
- Termini: Beijing West, Beijing, China; Gia Lâm, Hanoi, Vietnam
- Stops: Pinxiang; Đồng Đăng
- Train numbers: Z5/6 (Beijing-Nanning); T8701/8702 (Nanning-Hanoi)
- Lines used: Jingguang railway, Hengyang–Liuzhou Intercity Railway, Liuzhou–Nanning Intercity Railway, Xianggui railway and Hanoi–Đồng Đăng railway

On-board services
- Classes: Soft sleeper Hard sleeper(Domestic section in China only); Hard seat (Domestic section in China only)
- Seating arrangements: Yes (Domestic section in China only)
- Sleeping arrangements: Yes
- Catering facilities: Yes (Domestic section in China only)
- Baggage facilities: Luggage coach (Domestic section in China only)

Technical
- Rolling stock: Type 25T coaches (Beijing-Nanning); Type 25G coaches (Nanning-Hanoi); VNR coaches (Hanoi–Đồng Đăng)
- Track gauge: 1,435 mm (4 ft 8 1/2 in)

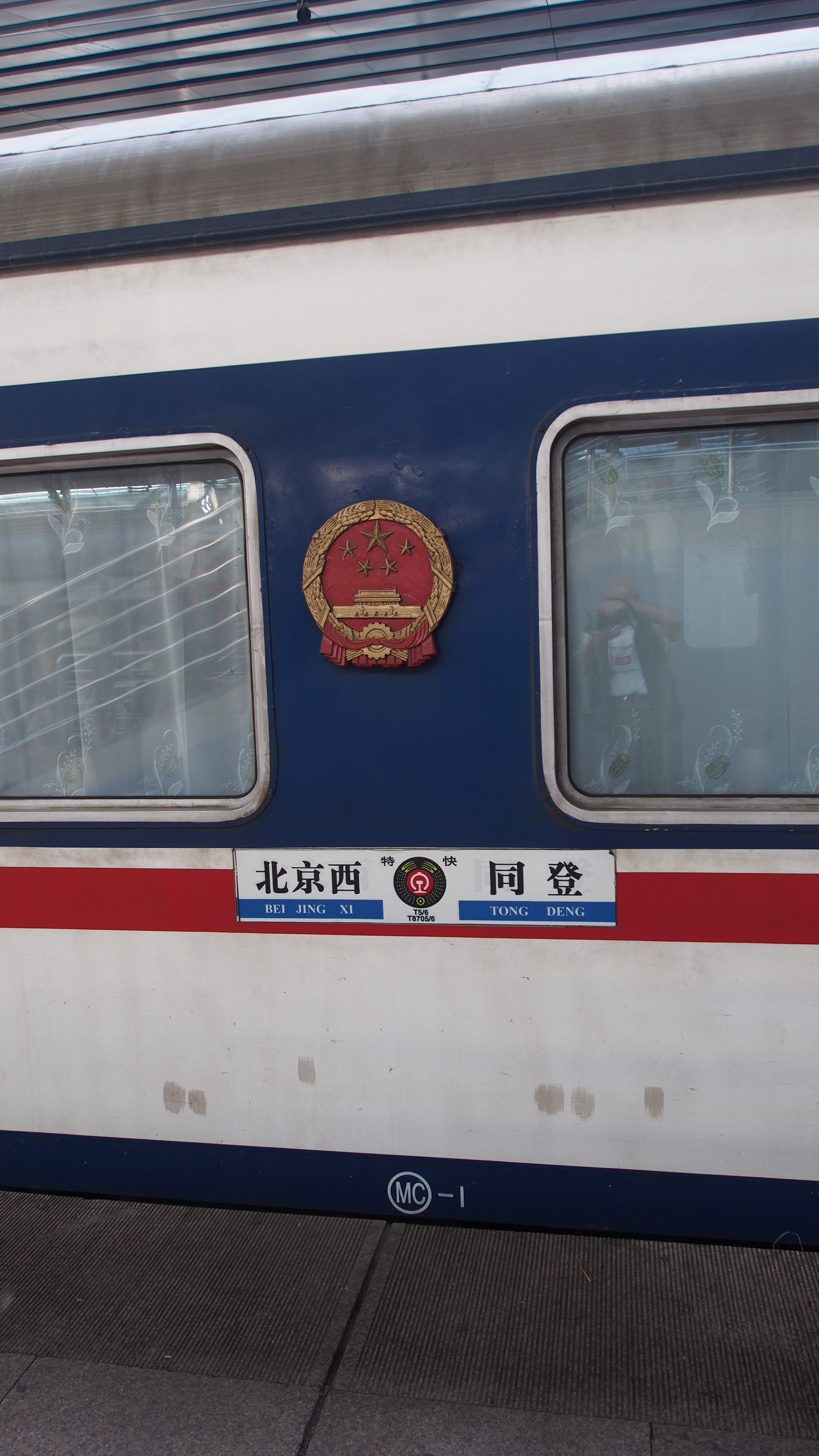
The train information board of T5/6 train, reading "Dong Dang–Beijing West" (this board used to 10 December 2014)

The Beijing–Nanning–Hanoi through train (Chinese: 北京-南宁-河内国际列车，Vietnamese: Đường sắt Bắc Kinh - Nam Ninh - Hà Nội/塘鐵北京 - 南寧 - 河内) also known as "Liu Sanjie (The Singing Fairy)" (Chinese: 刘三姐号) is an international railway service between Gia Lâm railway station (via Dong Dang railway station) in Vietnam and the Beijing West railway station in China, jointly operated by Nanning Railway Bureau of China's national rail service, with service provided by Nanning Passenger Service Department. The train runs to Beijing and Hanoi every three days.

The train runs along the Jingguang railway, followed by the Hengyang–Liuzhou Intercity Railway, the Liuzhou–Nanning Intercity Railway, and the Xianggui railway. It crosses into Vietnam at Đồng Đăng and completes its journey on the dual gauge Hanoi–Đồng Đăng railway. The total journey time is approximately 36 hours, and the train uses 25T class train carriages.

From December 2025, Đồng Đăng railway checkpoint is included in the list of E-visa ports of entry

From February 6, 2020, in accordance with anti-pandemic measures, international service between Nanning and Hanoi (Gia Lam) was suspended. Service was restarted on May 25, 2025, with daily service on T8701/2 between Nanning and Hanoi (Gia Lam). Through service from Beijing also restarted, leaving every Thursday and Sunday and returning every Tuesday and Friday as train MR1.

== Train Composition ==
=== Beijing West-Nanning section ===
Section	Beijing West↔Nanning				
Coach	1-4	5-8	9	10	11-19
Type	YW25T Hard sleeper	RW25T Soft sleeper	RW25T Soft sleeper	CA25T Restaurant	YW25T Hard sleeper
Operator	CR Beijing All passengers to Hanoi will be assigned to coach 9 and change to coach 4/L1 of T8701/8702 at Nanning station				

=== Nanning-Hanoi section ===
Section	Nanning↔Hanoi		Nanning↔Pinxiang
Coach	Nil	7,4/L1,3-1	A1-A7
Type	KD25G Air-con	RW25G Soft sleeper Coach 4/L1 is reserved for passengers for Z5/6	YZ25G Hard seat
Operator	CR Nanning		

== Locomotive routing ==
- Beijing West–Nanning: China Railways HXD3D, Beijing Locomotive Depot, Beijing Railway Bureau
- Nanning–Dong Dang: China Railways DF4D, Nanning Locomotive Depot, Nanning Railway Bureau
- Dong Dang–Hanoi (Gia Lâm): Vietnam Railways D14E, D19Er, Vietnam Railways

== Schedule ==
=== Current schedule ===
- 1 hour difference between China and Vietnam

Z5/T8701/MR2					Stops	MR1/T8702/Z6				
Train no.	Distance	Day	Arrival	Departure	Stops	Arrival	Departure	Day	Distance	Train no.
Z5	0	Day 1	—	16:05	Beijing West	09:59	—	Day 3	2891	Z6
Z5	281	Day 1	18:30	18:36	Shijiazhuang	07:17	07:23	Day 3	2610	Z6
Z5	689	Day 1	22:05	22:11	Zhengzhou	03:42	03:48	Day 3	2202	Z6
Z5	1225	Day 2	02:50	02:56	Wuchang	22:54	23:00	Day 2	1666	Z6
Z5	1587	Day 2	06:13	06:19	Changsha	19:27	19:33	Day 2	1304	Z6
Z5	1773	Day 2	08:16	08:22	Hengyang	17:22	17:28	Day 2	1118	Z6
Z5	1909	Day 2	09:43	09:49	Yongzhou	↑	↑	Day 2	—	Z6
Z5	2108	Day 2	11:16	11:23	Guilin North	14:22	14:36	Day 2	783	Z6
Z5	2272	Day 2	12:47	12:53	Liuzhou	12:46	12:55	Day 2	619	Z6
Z5	2484	Day 2	14:27	14:32	Nanning East	11:03	11:08	Day 2	407	Z6
Z5/T8701	2495	Day 2	14:45	18:05	Nanning	10:06	10:50	Day 2	396	T8702/Z6
T8701	2617	Day 2	20:15	20:21	Chongzuo	07:56	08:01	Day 2	274	T8702
T8701	2672	Day 2	21:25	21:29	Ningming	06:49	06:53	Day 2	219	T8702
T8701	2715	Day 2	22:18	23:41	Pingxiang	04:31	06:05	Day 2	176	T8702
↑ China（CST UTC+08:00） / Vietnam（VST UTC+07:00） ↓
T8701/MR2	2734	Day 2	23:22	01:55	Đồng Đăng	00:55	02:50	Day 2	157	MR1/T8702
MR2	2847	Day 3	04:33	04:36	Bắc Giang	22:11	22:14	Day 1	44	MR1
MR2	2891	Day 3	05:30	—	Gia Lâm	—	21:20	Day 1	0	MR1

== See also ==
- Nanning railway station
- T189/190 Beijing–Nanning through train
