= Laibin North railway station =

Railway station in Laibin, Guangxi

Laibin North 来宾北
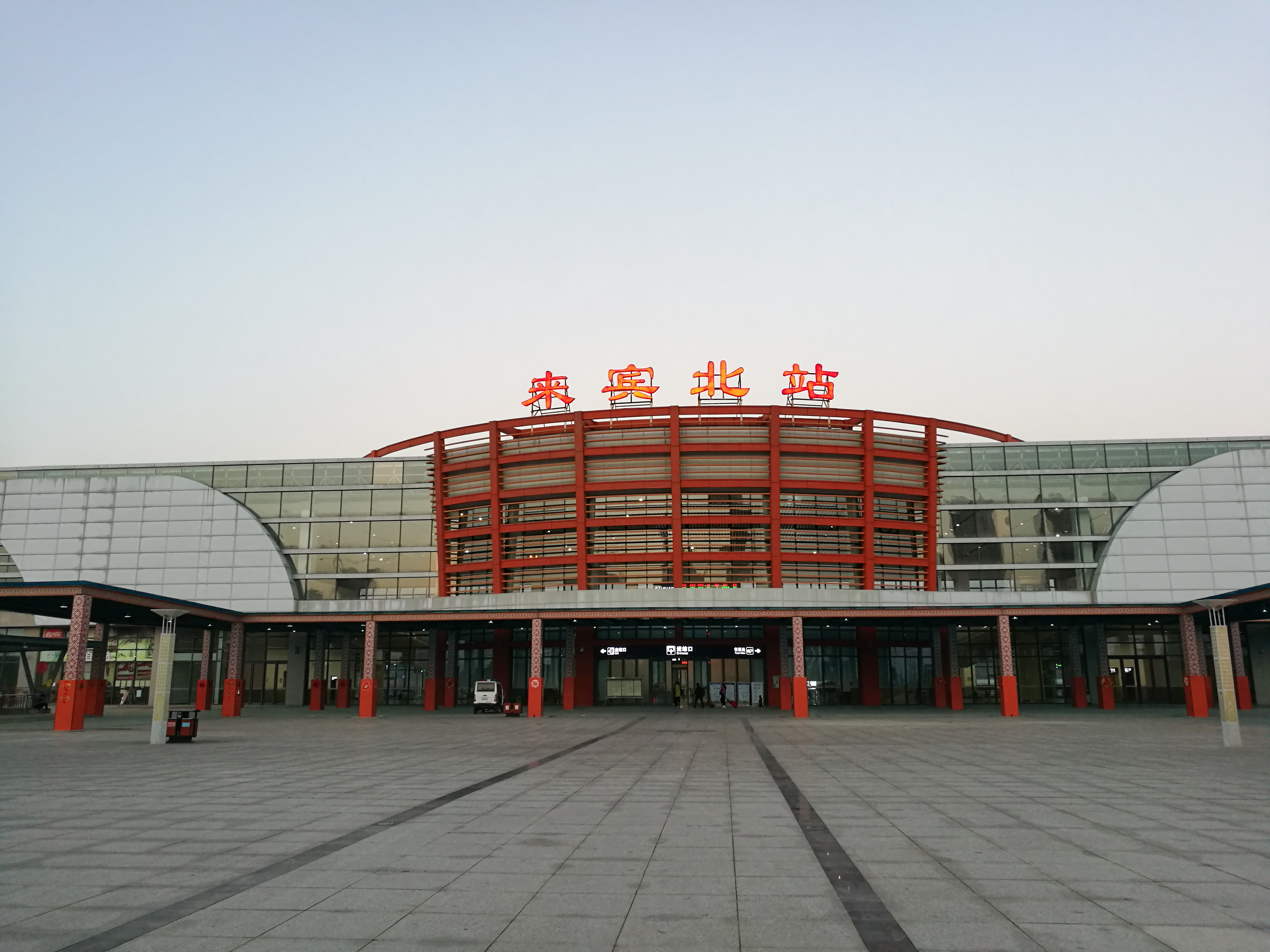
- The station building in 2020

General information
- Location: Xingbin District, Laibin, Guangxi; China
- Coordinates: 23°45′15.55″N 109°14′27.73″E
- Line(s): Liuzhou–Nanning intercity railway
- Platforms: 5

History
- Opened: 20 July 2014
Location

Laibin North railway station (Chinese: 来宾北站) is a railway station in Xingbin District, Laibin, Guangxi, China. It is an intermediate stop on the Liuzhou–Nanning intercity railway. It opened on 20 July 2014. It is situated approximately 2.4 kilometres (1.5 miles) away from the older Laibin railway station.

The station has two island platforms and a side platform, with a total of five platform faces.

Preceding station	China Railway High-speed	Following station
Liuzhou Terminus	Liuzhou–Nanning intercity railway	Binyang towards Nanning
