= T189/190 Beijing–Nanning through train =

Railway service in China

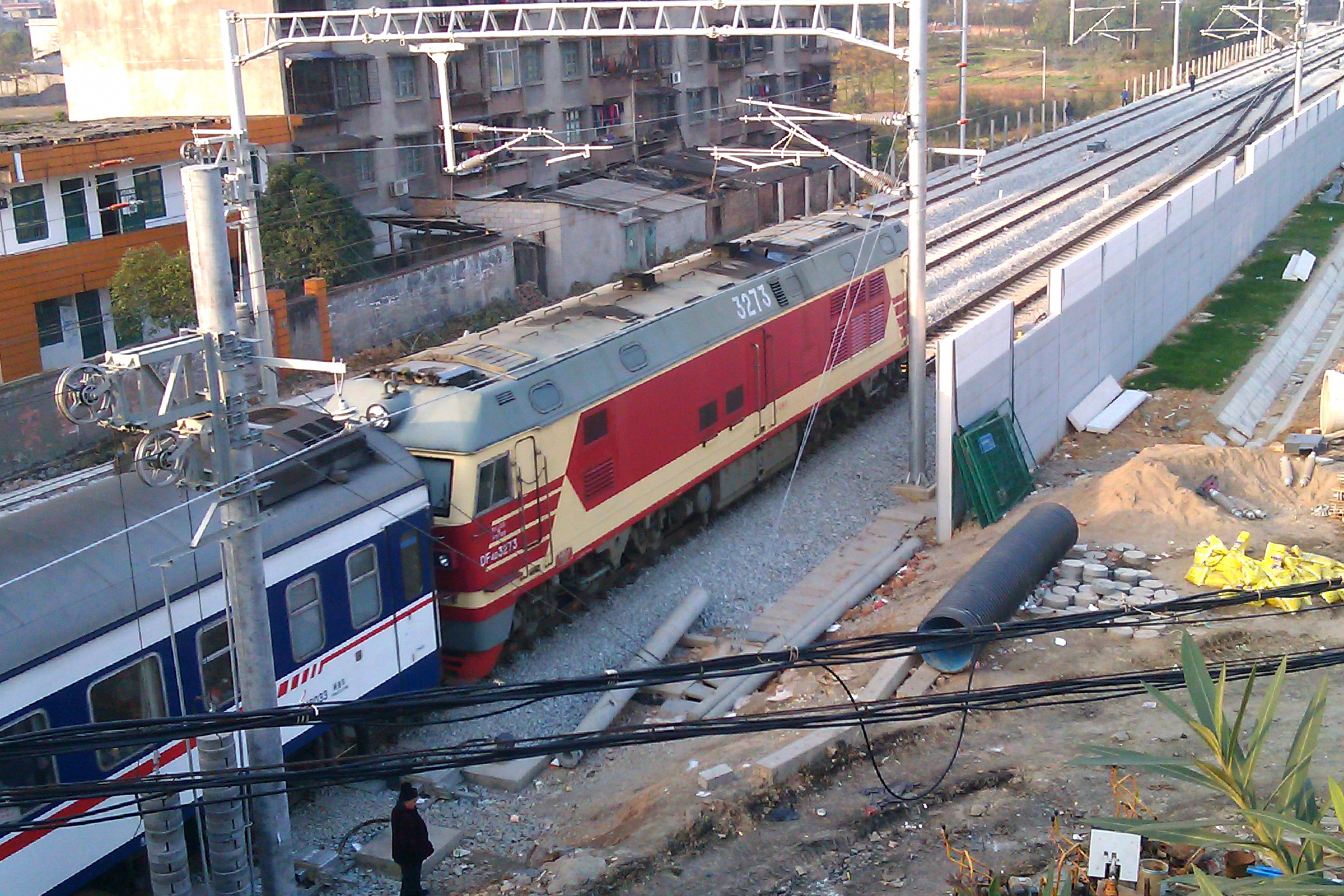
Nanning-Beijing T190 Train, hauled by a DF4D diesel locomotive, passing through Lingchuan railway station in Guangxi

The T189/190 Beijing–Nanning through train (Chinese:T189/190次北京西到南宁特快列车) is a Chinese railway running between the capital Beijing to Nanning, capital of Guangxi express passenger trains by the Nanning Railway Bureau, Nanning passenger segment responsible for passenger transport task, Nanning originating on the Beijing train. 25K Type Passenger trains running along the Jingguang Railway, and Xianggui Railway across Guangxi, Hunan, Hubei, Henan, Hebei, Beijing and other provinces and cities, the entire 2566 km. Beijing West railway station to Nanning Station running 28 hours and 39 minutes, use trips for T189; Nanning Station to Beijing West railway station to run 28 hours and 12 minutes, use trips for T190.

== See also ==
- Beijing–Nanning–Hanoi through train
