= Xingbin District =

Xingbin 兴宾区 • Hinghbinh Gih
- District
- Location in Guangxi
- Coordinates: 23.7273°N 109.235°E
- Country: China
- Province: Guangxi
- Prefecture-level city: Laibin
- District seat: Hexi Subdistrict

Area
  - Total: 4,404 km^{2} (1,700 sq mi)

Population (2020 census)
  - Total: 925,377
  - Density: 210.1/km^{2} (544.2/sq mi)
- Time zone: UTC+8 (China Standard)
- Website: www.xingbin.gov.cn

Xingbin District (simplified Chinese: 兴宾区; traditional Chinese: 興賓區; pinyin: Xīngbīn Qū; Zhuang: Hinghbinh Gih) is the only district of the city of Laibin, Guangxi, China.

== Administrative divisions ==
Xingbin District is divided into 4 subdistricts, 16 towns, and 4 townships:

- Chengdong Subdistrict (城东街道)
- Chengbei Subdistrict (城北街道)
- Hexi Subdistrict (河西街道)
- Laihua Subdistrict (来华街道)
- Fenghuang Town (凤凰镇)
- Liangjiang Town (良江镇)
- Xiaopingyang Town (小平阳镇)
- Qianjiang Town (迁江镇)
- Shiling Town (石陵镇)
- Pingyang Town (平阳镇)
- Mengcun Town (蒙村镇)
- Dawan Town (大湾镇)
- Qiaogong Town (桥巩镇)
- Sishan Town (寺山镇)
- Chengxiang Town (城厢镇)
- Sanwu Town (三五镇)
- Taodeng Town (陶邓镇)
- Shiya Town (石牙镇)
- Wushan Town (五山镇)
- Liangtang Town (良塘镇)
- Qidong Township (七洞乡)
- Nansi Township (南泗乡)
- Gao'an Township (高安乡)
- Zhenglong Township (正龙乡)

== Transportation ==
Laibin railway station on the Hunan–Guangxi railway and Laibin North railway station on the Liuzhou–Nanning intercity railway are both situated here.
