= Nanning–Guangzhou high-speed railway =

Railway line in China

Nanning–Guangzhou high-speed railway 南广铁路

Overview
- Status: Operational
- Locale: Nanning; Guangzhou
- Termini: Nanning; Guangzhou South
- Stations: 23

Service
- Services: 1
- Operator(s): CR Guangzhou Group, CR Nanning Group

History
- Opened: December 26, 2014

Technical
- Line length: 576 km (358 mi)
- Track gauge: 1,435 mm (4 ft 8 1/2 in)
- Minimum radius: 3,500 m (11,483 ft)
- Operating speed: 250 km/h (155 mph)
- Maximum incline: Nanning-Guigang 12% Guigang-Guangzhou 6%

The Nanning–Guangzhou high-speed railway (Chinese: 南宁至广州铁路; pinyin: Nánníng zhì Guǎngzhōu Tiělù), abbreviated as Nan–Guang railway (Chinese: 南广铁路; pinyin: Nán–Guǎng Tiělù), connects Nanning, capital of Guangxi Zhuang Autonomous Region, and Guangzhou, capital of Guangdong Province, in China. Construction started on November 9, 2008; Nanning to Wuzhou was completed by April 18, 2014, while the full route opened on December 26, 2014. The total cost was about 41 billion RMB. The railway is expected to spur economic development, and increase mobility across the Guangxi and western Guangdong regions.

== Route ==
The railway travels mostly along the Pearl River Delta's Xi River valley. From Nanning it initially follows the route of the Liuzhou–Nanning Intercity Railway to Litang in Binyang County. It then heads eastward through Guigang, crossing the Yu River, over Guiping, Pingnan and Tengxian to Wuzhou. After entering Guangdong it passes Yunan and Yunfu to Zhaoqing, before reaching Guangzhou South railway station. Its total length is 576 km (358 mi), 349 km (217 mi) of which is in Guangxi, 227 km (141 mi) in Guangdong. Twenty-three stations will be built along the route, though not all will service passengers.

== Technical standards ==
The railway is electrified, with a double track standard construction for high-speed passenger trains and fast freight trains. The operating speed is 200 km/h for D (First Generation) Trains, and up to 250 km/h for G (Second Generation) Trains.

- Grade : national grade I
- The number of main lines: double
- Passenger train design speed: D Trains 200 km/h, G Trains 250 km/h
- Minimum curve radius : 3500m
- Limiting slope : Nanning to Guigang 12 ‰, Guigang to Guangzhou South 6 ‰
- Traction types : electric traction
- Traction Quality : 4000t
- Block mode : automatic block
- Construction Clearance: CDB double-stack container trains to meet the transport requirements.

== Construction history ==
- November 9, 2008 – Construction started.
- October 10, 2009 – Breakthrough on the first tunnel.
- June 22, 2011 – Ceremony to commemorate the completion of construction work in Guangxi.
- May 22, 2012 – Songgen Yunan Tunnel, located in Yunfu City, Guangdong completed with a total length of 3,123 meters.
- March 4, 2014 – Northridge Hill Tunnel is completed, located in Zhaoqing, Guangdong Province. With a total length of 12,438 meters, it is the longest tunnel.
- April 18, 2014 – Guangxi segment of Nanning-Guangzhou railway opens. Nanning to Wuzhou now just takes two and a half hours.
- July 7, 2014 – Construction completed from Wuzhou to Zhaoqing.
- November 8, 2014 – The last section is completed and ready for final testing.
- December 26, 2014 – The whole line is opened to traffic.

== Future development ==
Rail Transport in Nanning

Nanning is already connected by conventional-speed rail to Vietnam, though Pingxiang on the China–Vietnam border. Nanning–Pingxiang high-speed railway is also under construction. This would allow high-speed trains from Guangzhou to Nanning to continue on to Vietnam and other countries in ASEAN, connecting with the Kunming–Singapore railway.
