= Litang =

Litang may refer to:

- Litang or Lithang County (理塘县) in Sichuan/Kham, site of the Lithang Monastery
- Chiefdom of Lithang (1719–1906), a Tibetan polity
- Litang, Guangxi (黎塘镇), town in Binyang County
- Li Tang (hall of worship) (禮堂), place to perform religious rituals and to learn the teachings of Confucius
- Li Tang (梨汤), a hot pear broth
