= Pingyang =

Pingyang (simplified Chinese: 平阳; traditional Chinese: 平陽) may refer to:

- Linfen, formerly known as Pingyang, prefecture-level city of Shanxi
- Princess Pingyang (590s–623), Chinese princess of the Tang dynasty
- Pingyang County, Wenzhou, Zhejiang
- Pingyang Township, Rongjiang County, Guizhou

Towns

- Pingyang, Tailai County (平洋镇), Heilongjiang
- Pingyang, Beihai, in Yinhai District, Beihai, Guangxi
- Pingyang, Laibin, in Xingbin District, Laibin, Guangxi
- Pingyang, Fuping County, Hebei
- Pingyang, Gannan County, Heilongjiang
- Pingyang, Jidong County, Heilongjiang
