= Đồng Đăng station =

Railway station in Vietnam

Coordinates: 21°56′38″N 106°41′50″E

Dong Dang Ga Đồng Đăng
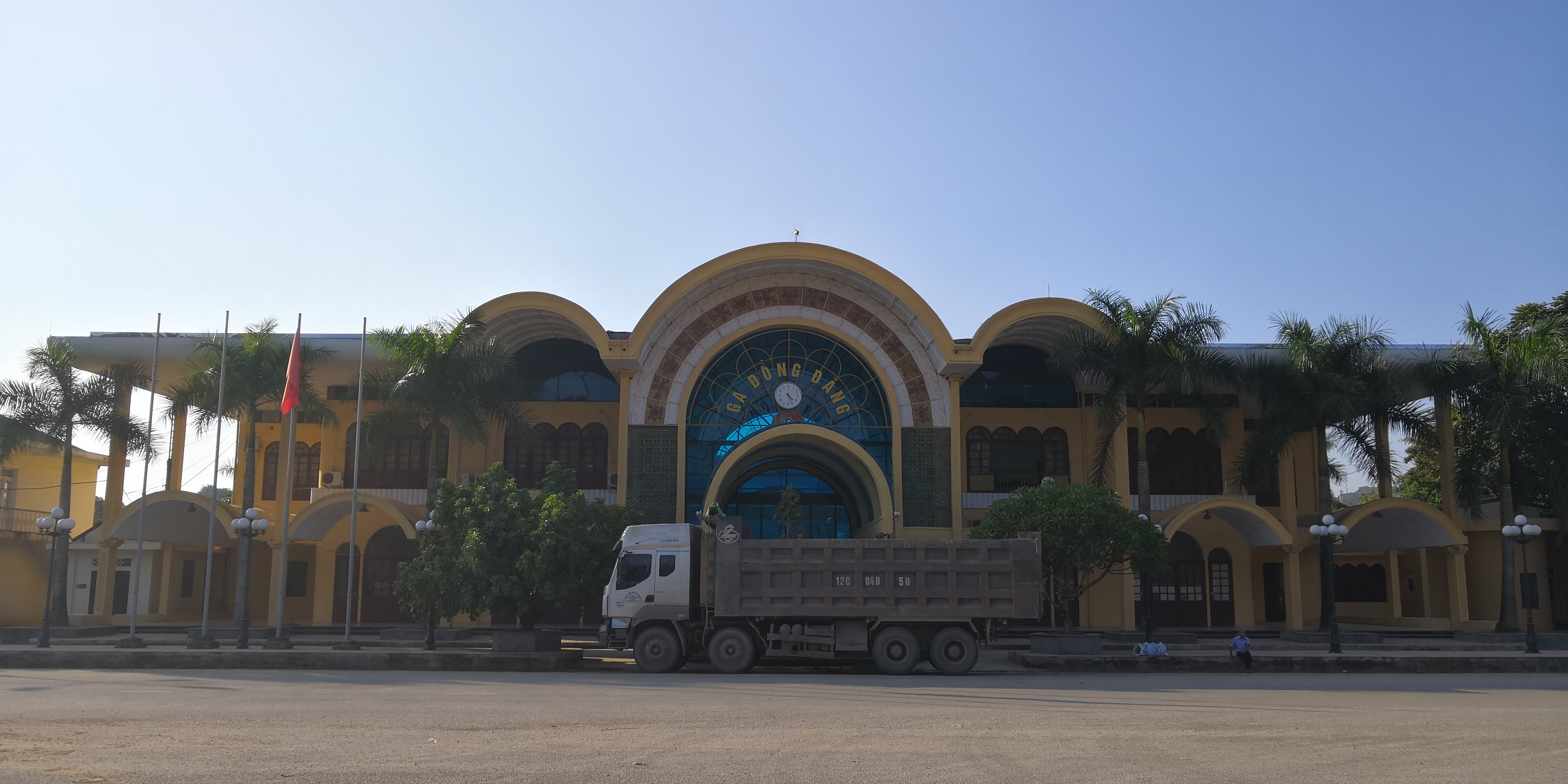
- Đồng Đăng station, outside view

General information
- Location: Đồng Đăng, Cao Lộc, Lạng Sơn; Vietnam
- Owner: Vietnam Railways
- Operator: Vietnam Railways
- Line: Hanoi–Đồng Đăng Railway
- Platforms: 2
- Tracks: 7

Construction
- Structure type: Ground

History
- Opened: April 24, 1889

Services
Preceding station	Vietnam Railways	Following station
Bắc Giang towards Gia Lâm	Beijing–Nanning–Hanoi	through to China Railway
Preceding station	China Railway	Following station
through to Hanoi–Đồng Đăng railway	Beijing–Nanning–Hanoi	Pingxiang towards Beijing West
Location

1896

Đồng Đăng station (Vietnamese: Ga Đồng Đăng) is a railway station in Vietnam. It serves the town of Đồng Đăng, in Lạng Sơn Province. It is the last station on the line before the Friendship Pass border crossing with Pingxiang, Guangxi in China. It is not possible for foreigners to board the international train at the station. The station is fitted with dual gauge tracks.

At 08:13 AM on February 26, 2019, Đồng Đăng Station was honored to be the first place of Vietnam to welcome North Korean leader Kim Jong Un to prepare for the summit with US President Donald Trump in Hanoi.

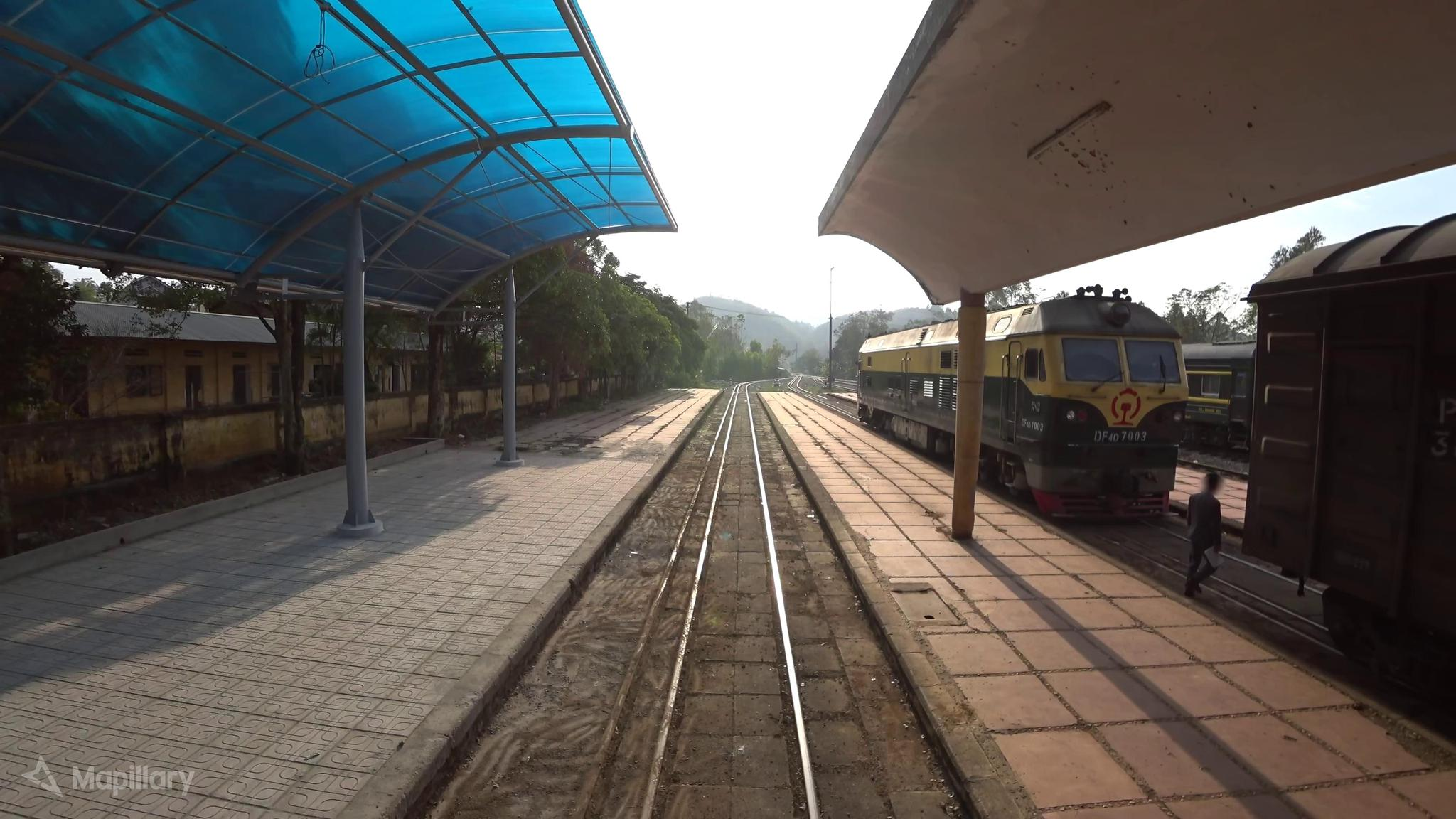
Platform view

== See also ==
- Beijing–Nanning–Hanoi through train
- Hunan–Guangxi railway
