= Hechun–Maoming railway =

Railway line in Guangdong, China

The Hechun–Maoming railway or Hemao railway (simplified Chinese: 河茂铁路; traditional Chinese: 河茂鐵路; pinyin: hémào tiělù), is a railroad in Guangdong Province, China, between Hechun Station on the Litang–Zhanjiang railway and the city of Maoming. The line has a total length of 61.56 km (38 mi) and was built from 1956 to 1959. The line was originally built to support the development of the petrochemical industry in Maoming. After the completion of the Sanshui–Maoming railway in 1991, the Hemao Line became a connecting section between the Litang–Zhanjiang and Guangzhou–Maoming railways. Together, the three railways form part of China's southern coastal railway corridor.

== Rail connections ==
- Hechun Station: Litang–Zhanjiang railway
- Maoming: Guangzhou–Maoming railway, Luoyang–Zhanjiang railway

== See also ==
- List of railways in China
