= Nanning–Zhuhai high-speed railway =

Railway line in China

Overview
- Status: Operational
- Termini: Nanning East; Yulin North
- Stations: 5

Service
- Type: High-speed rail
- Operator(s): China Railway High-speed

Technical
- Line length: 193 km (120 mi) (Nanning to Yulin); 648 km (403 mi) (Nanning to Zhuhai)
- Track gauge: 1,435 mm (4 ft 8 1/2 in) standard gauge
- Operating speed: 350 km/h (217 mph)

The Nanning–Zhuhai high-speed railway (the section from Nanning to Yulin formerly known as Nanning–Yulin intercity railway) is a high-speed railway line in China. The line will be 193 kilometres (120 mi) long and have a maximum speed of 350 kilometres per hour (220 mph).

== History ==
Construction began on 15 January 2019. It was renamed to the Nanning–Yulin section of Nanning–Zhuhai high-speed railway, and opened on 30 December 2024.

== Stations ==
The western terminus of the Nanning to Yulin section of the railway is Nanning East. The eastern terminus is Yulin North. The railway have three intermediate stations: Luancheng, Hengzhou, and Xingye South.

Station Name	Chinese	Metro transfers/connections
Nanning East	南宁东	1
Luancheng	峦城	
Hengzhou	横州	
Xingye South	兴业南	
Yulin North	玉林北	
