= Litang–Qinzhou railway =

Railway line in Guangxi, China

The Litang–Qinzhou railway or Liqin railway (simplified Chinese: 黎钦铁路; traditional Chinese: 黎钦鐵路; pinyin: líqīn tiělù), is a railroad in Guangxi Autonomous Region of China that branches off the Hunan–Guangxi railway in Heng County in central Guangxi, about 60 km south of Litang Township, and runs further south to the port city of Qinzhou, on the Gulf of Tonkin. The line has a total length of 156 km (97 mi) and entered operations in 1994. Major cities and towns along route include Heng County, Lingshan County and Qinzhou.

== Rail connections ==
- Litang: Hunan–Guangxi railway, Litang–Zhanjiang railway

== See also ==
- List of railways in China
