= China Railways HXD1C =

Class of Chinese electric locomotives

HXD1C 和谐1C型电力机车
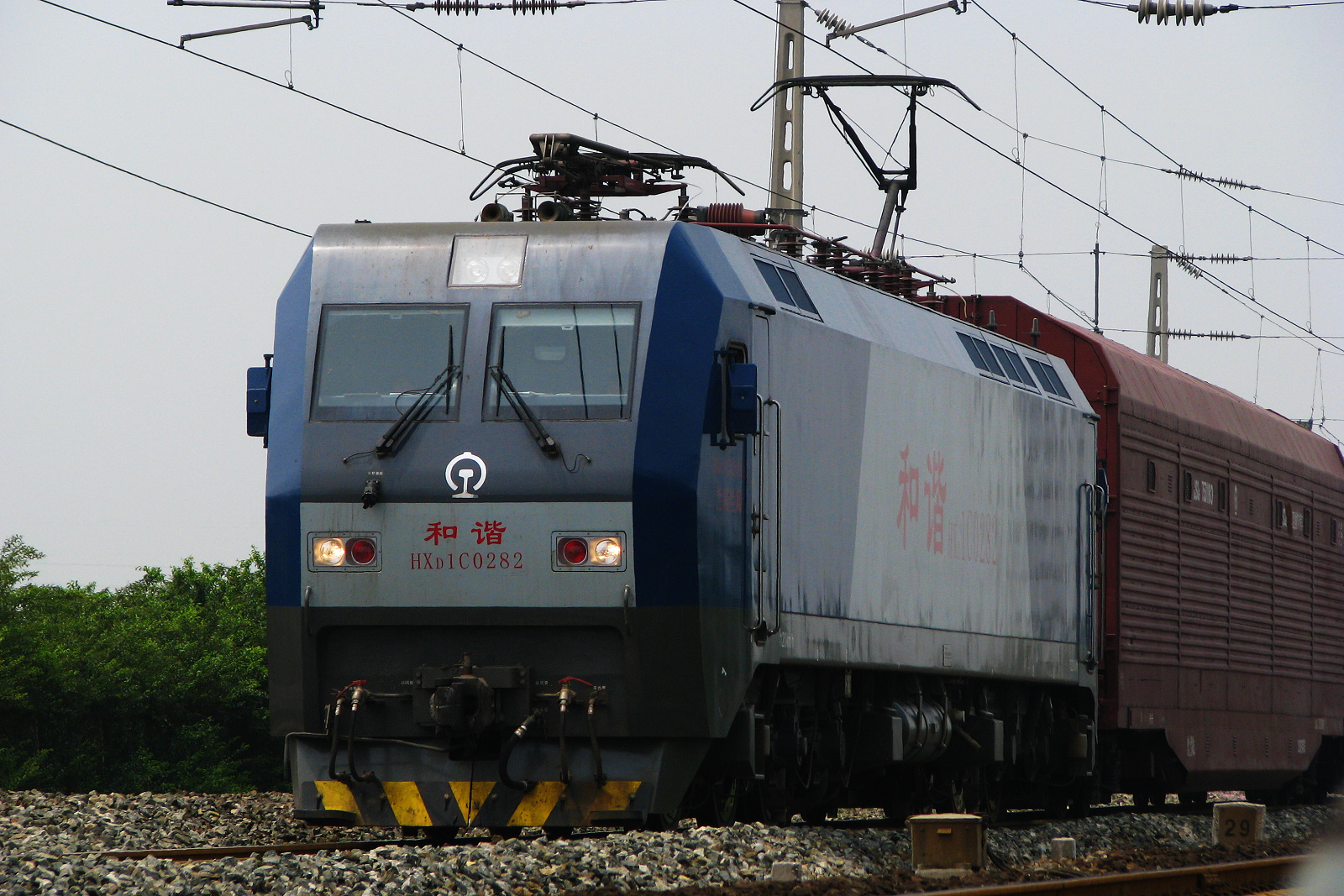
- HXD1C-0282
Type and origin
- Power type: Electric
- Builder: CRRC Zhuzhou Locomotive; CRRC Ziyang Locomotive; CRRC Qishuyan
- Build date: 2009-present
- Total produced: 1207
Specifications
- Configuration
  - UIC: Co′Co′
- Gauge: 1,435 mm (4 ft 8 1/2 in) standard gauge
- Wheel diameter: 1.250 to 1.150 m (4 ft 1.2 in to 3 ft 9.3 in) (new/worn)
- Axle load: 23 t (22.6 long tons; 25.4 short tons); 25 t (24.6 long tons; 27.6 short tons)
- Adhesive weight: 100%
- Loco weight: 138 t (136 long tons; 152 short tons)(axle load at 23t); 150 t (150 long tons; 170 short tons)(axle load at 25t)
- Electric system/s: 25 kV 50 Hz AC Catenary
- Current pickup(s): Pantograph
- Traction motors: Six 3-Phase AC Traction Motors; 1,225 kW (1,643 hp) rating
- Transmission: AC-DC-AC
- Loco brake: regenerative and electro-pneumatic
Performance figures
- Maximum speed: 120 km/h (75 mph)
- Power output: 7,200 kW (9,700 hp) (continuous)
- Tractive effort: starting 520 kN (120,000 lb_{f})(axle load at 23t); 570 kN (130,000 lb_{f})(axle load at 25t)

The HXD1C (Chinese: 和谐1C型电力机车) is an electric locomotive developed by CRRC Zhuzhou Electric Locomotive Co., Ltd. The design was revealed in 2009: a 7.2 MW power six axle, 150-tonne, Co'Co' locomotive.

This type of locomotive can draft a 5000-5500t freight train at a gradient of not more than 12‰ of middle-east lines in China. It has high cost performance and distinct comprehensive environmental protection, energy-saving and economic benefits, and meanwhile, it is another main locomotive of Chinese railway transportation in future. An Ethiopian variant has been built for Addis Ababa-Djibouti Railway.

== Galleries ==
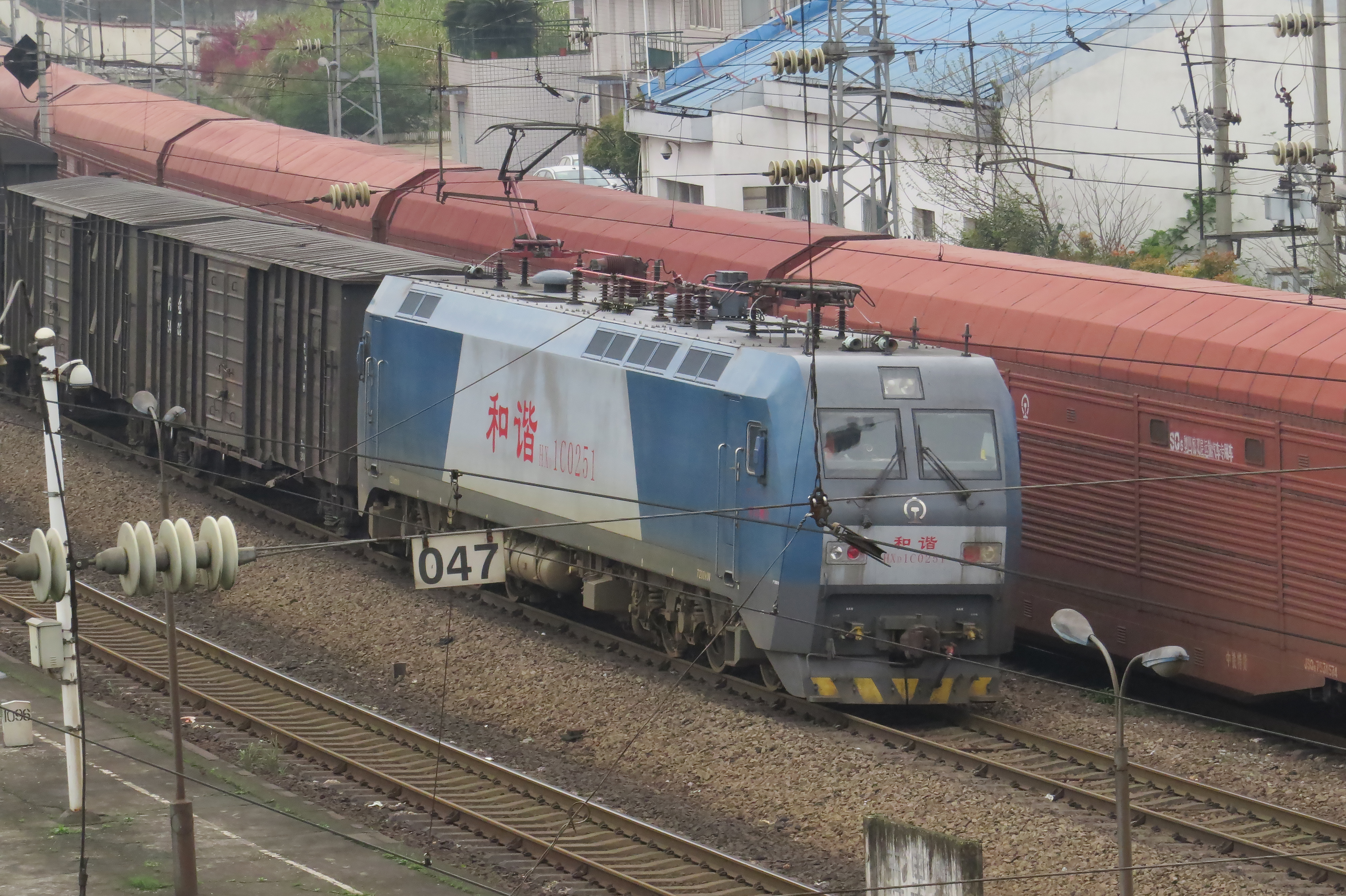
HXD1C-0251 in Wulidun Railway Station.

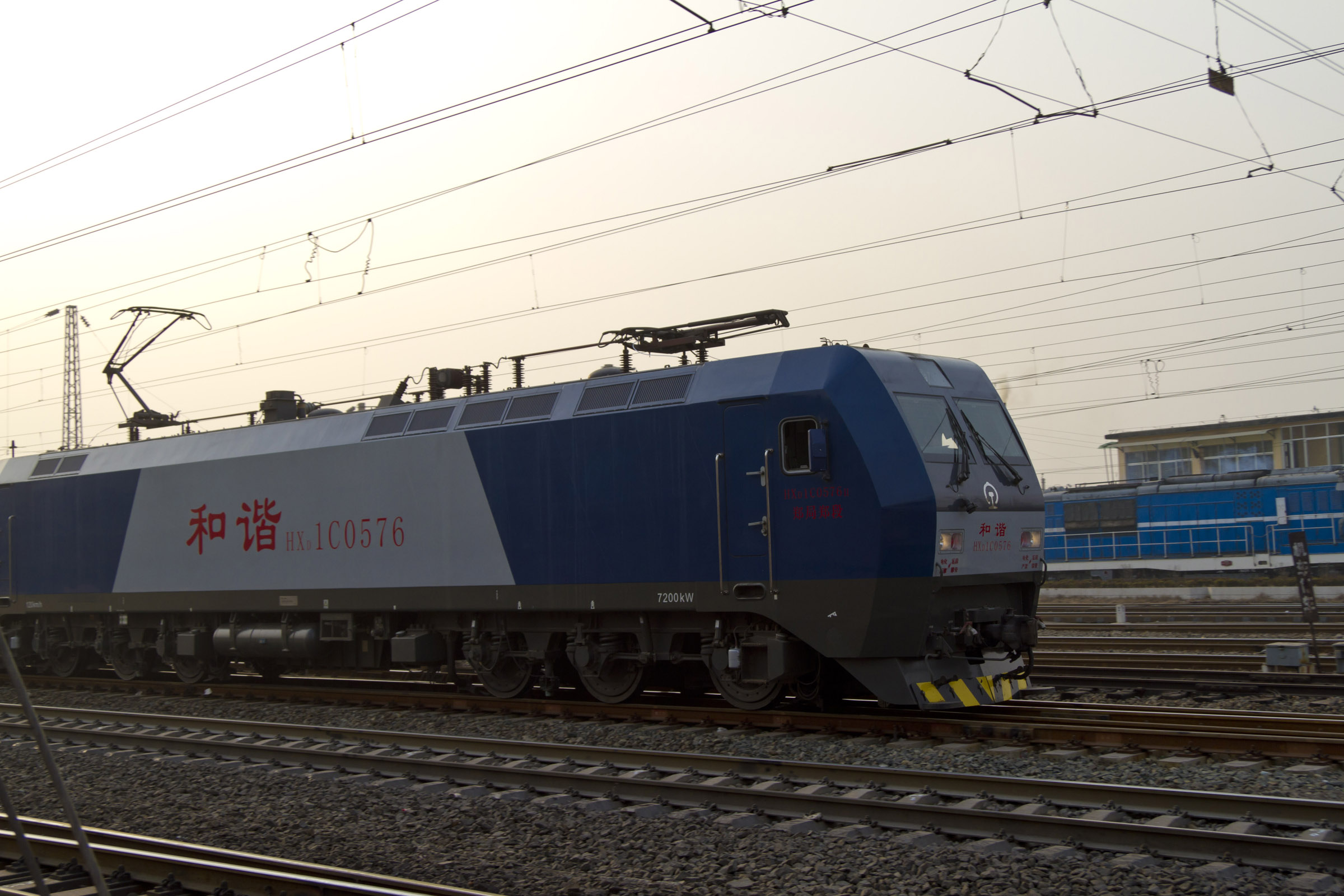
HXD1C-0576 in Huashan Railway Station.

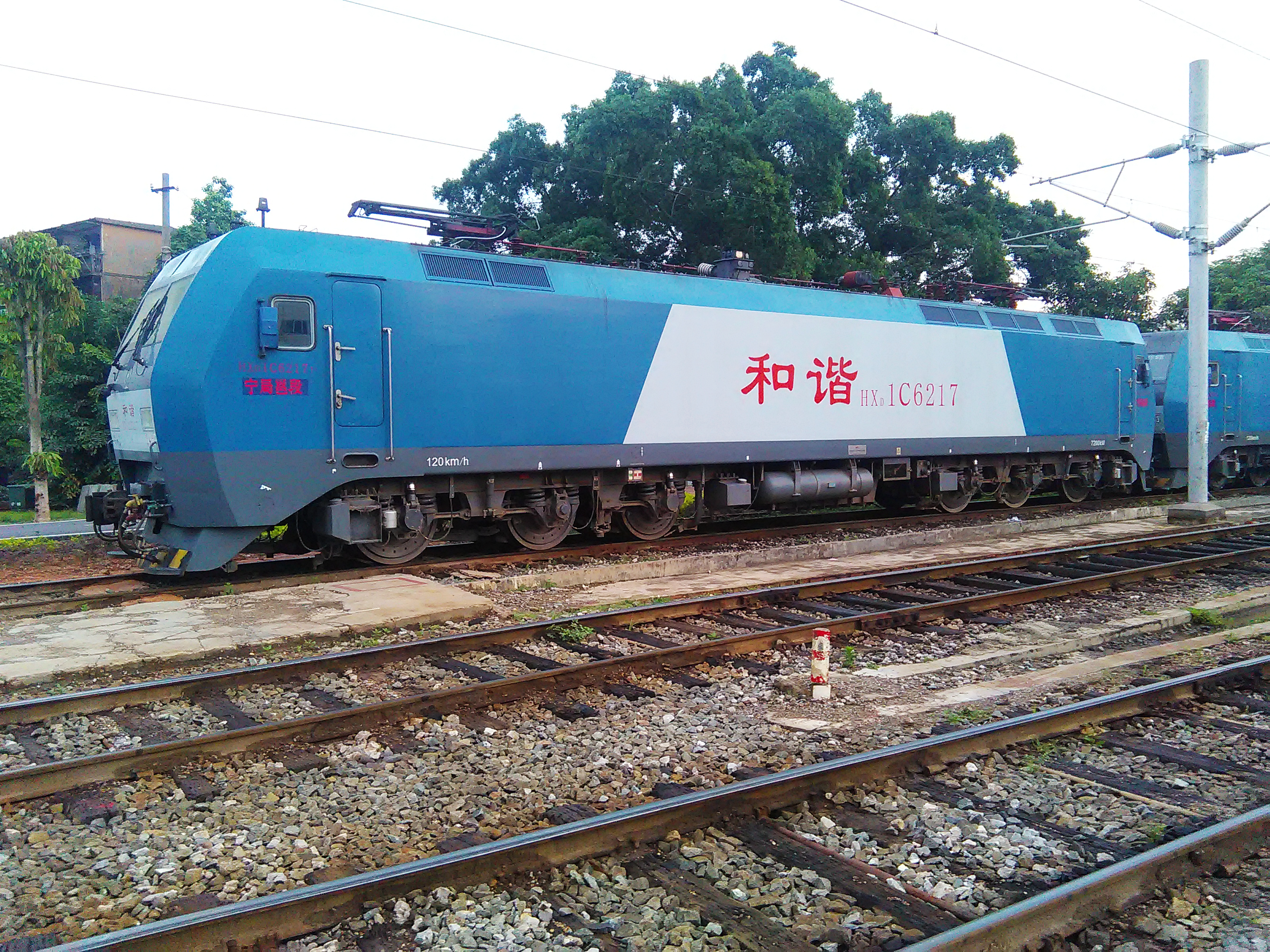
HXD1C-6217, Nanning Locomotive Depot.

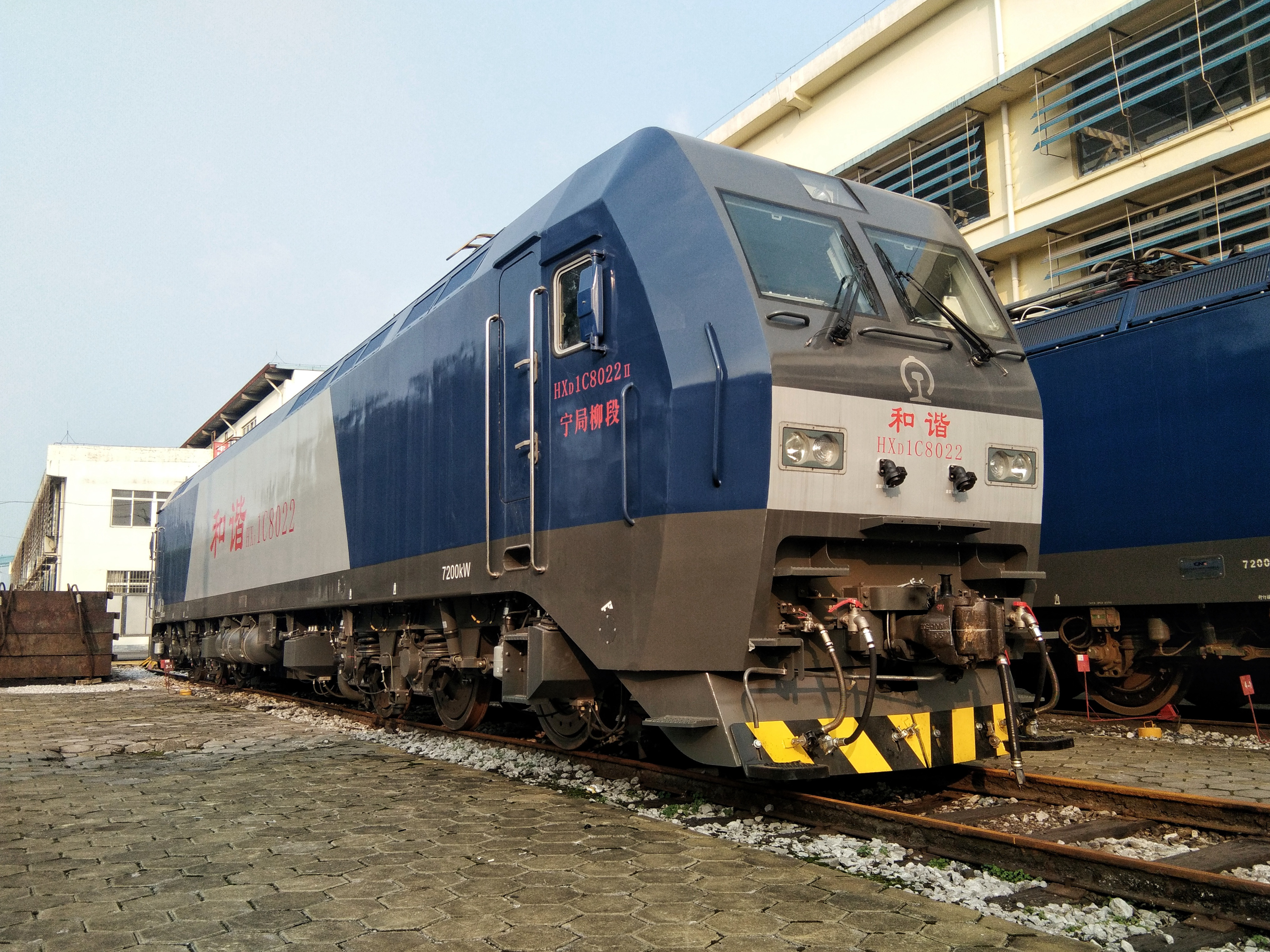
HXD1C-8022 in Liuzhou Locomotive Depot.

== Manufacturers ==
HXD1Cs have been manufactured by several companies:

- Zhuzhou Electric Locomotive Company Limited
- Ziyang Locomotive Works
- CRRC Qishuyan Locomotive Co., Ltd.

== See also ==
- China Railways HXD1
- China Railways HXD1B
- List of locomotives in China
