= Nanning–Fangchenggang railway =

Railway line in Guangxi, China

The Nanning–Fangchenggang railway (Chinese: 南防铁路; pinyin: Nán–Fáng tiělù) is a railway line in Guangxi, China.

== History ==
The section between Nanning South and Qinzhou railway station was the first to open, on 26 December 1985. On 15 December 1986, the extension to Fangchenggang railway station was opened.
