= Litang–Zhanjiang railway =

Railway in China between Litang, Guangxi and Zhanjiang, Guangdong

Quzhou–Ningde railway
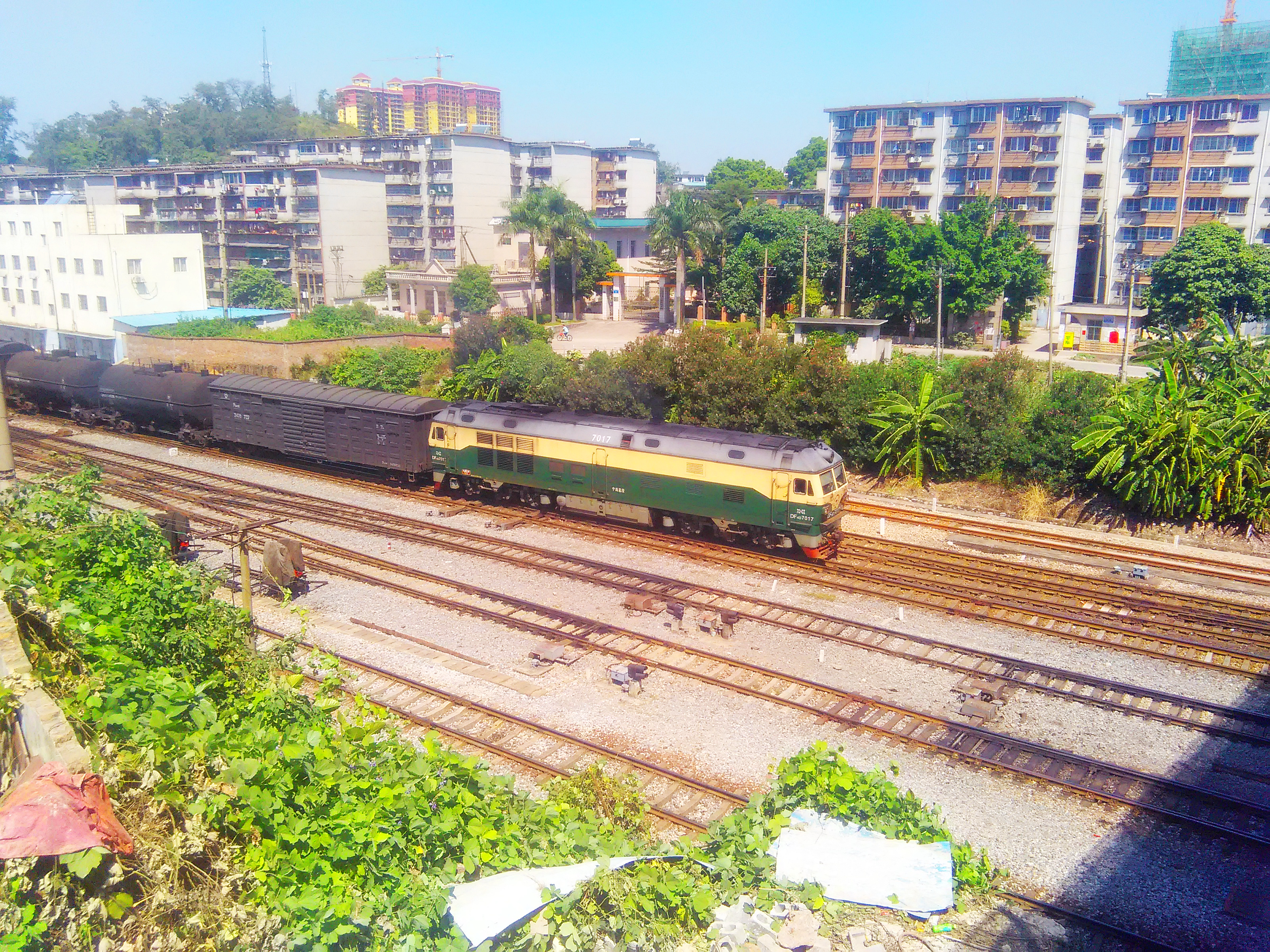
- DF4D 7017 in Yulin railway Station

Overview
- Status: Operational
- Termini: Litang; Zhanjiang

Service
- Type: Heavy rail

History
- Opened: 1 July 1955

Technical
- Line length: 318.2 km (198 mi)
- Track gauge: 1,435 mm (4 ft 8 1/2 in) standard gauge
- Electrification: 50 Hz 25,000 V
- Operating speed: 160 km/h (99 mph)

The Litang–Zhanjiang railway or Lizhan railway (simplified Chinese: 黎湛铁路; traditional Chinese: 黎湛鐵路; pinyin: lízhàn tiělù), is a railroad in southern China from Litang Township in the Guangxi Autonomous Region on the Hunan–Guangxi railway, to the port city of Zhanjiang, in Guangdong Province, on the South China Sea. The line has a total length of 318.2 km (198 mi) and was built from 1954 to 1955. Major cities and towns along the route include Guigang, Xingye County, Yulin (Guangxi), Luchuan, Lianjiang (Guangdong), Suixi (Guangdong) and Zhanjiang.

== History ==
The Litang–Zhanjiang railway was planned from 1952 to 1953 and built from September 25, 1954 to July 1, 1955. A 61 km (38 mi) spur line from the Hechun Station to Maoming was completed in 1959 and now connects the Lizhan Line with the Guangzhou–Maoming railway. From 2005 to 2009, the southernmost section of the Lizhan Line from Hechun Station to Zhanjiang, 62.7 km (39 mi) in length, was double-tracked and electrified to accommodate trains running at speeds of up to 140 km (87 mi). The Guigang to Yulin section of the line, 98 km (61 mi) in length, has been double-tracked and underwent capacity expansion from 2013 to 2015 to accommodate trains running at speeds of up to 160 km (99 mi) to 200 km (124 mi). The project is complete for the Guigang–Yulin section, and the EMU train entered operation in the end of 2016.

== Rail connections ==
- Litang: Hunan–Guangxi railway, Litang–Qinzhou railway
- Yulin: Luoyang–Zhanjiang railway
- Hechun station: Hechun–Maoming railway
- Zhanjiang: Guangdong–Hainan railway

== Incident ==
On 1 July 2008, a passenger train hit a landslide which caused the locomotive and six carriages to derail. Seven people were injured.

== See also ==
- List of railways in China
