= Nanning Locomotive Depot =

Railway depot in Nanning, Guangxi, China

Nanning Locomotive Depot (Chinese:南宁机务段) is a locomotive depot belong to Nanning Railway Bureau. It was founded in 1951.

== Equipped models ==
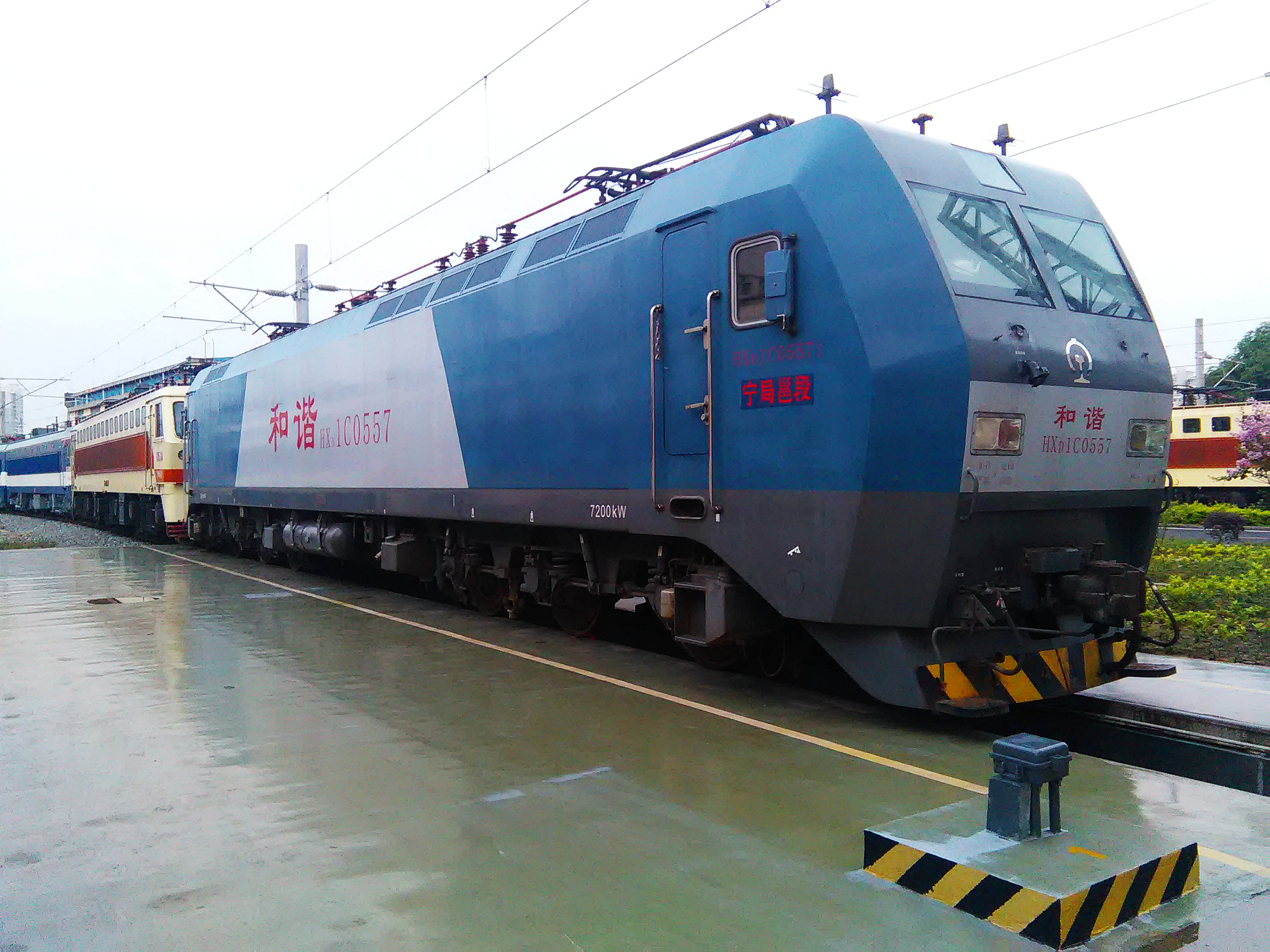
China Railways HXD1C 0557 in Nanning Locomotive Depot.

- China Railways DF4B
- China Railways DF4C
- China Railways DF4D(4000 Series and 7000 Series)
- China Railways DF5
- China Railways DF7C
- China Railways DF7G(5000 Series)
- China Railways DF8B
- China Railways HXN5B
- China Railways SS7
- China Railways SS7B
- China Railways HXD1C

== Dominated models ==
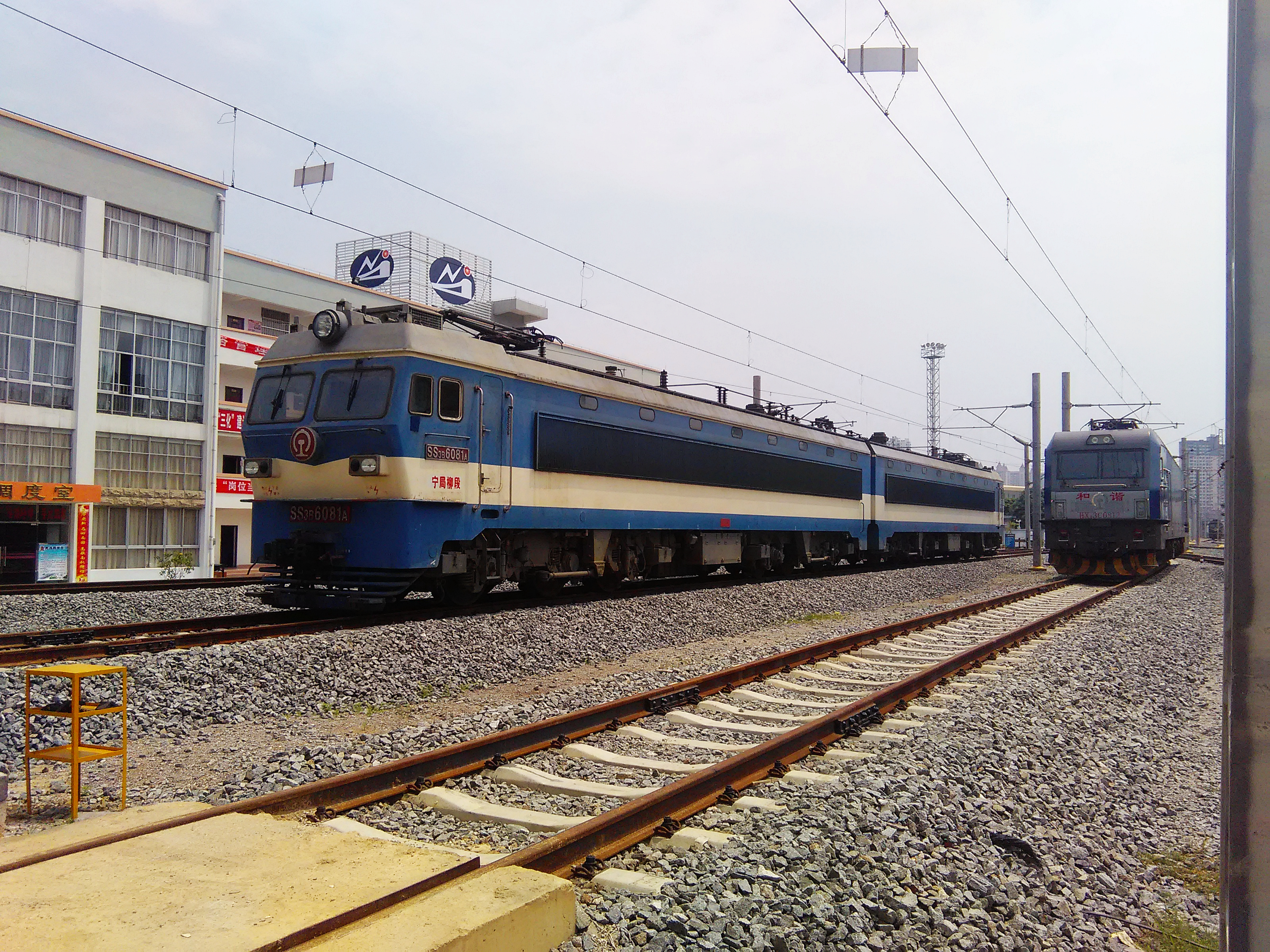
A Liuzhou Locomotive Depot's China Railways HXD3C(right) in Nanning Locomotive Depot

- China Railways SS7C
- China Railways HXD1D
- China Railways HXD3C
- China Railways HXD3D

== Subordinate Agencies ==
- Yulin Locomotive Area(Former Yulin Locomotive Depot)
- Nanning South Locomotive Area
- Baise Locomotive Area

== See also ==
- Nanning Railway Station
- Liuzhou Locomotive Depot
