= Nanning railway station =

Railway station in Nanning, China

Nanning 南宁
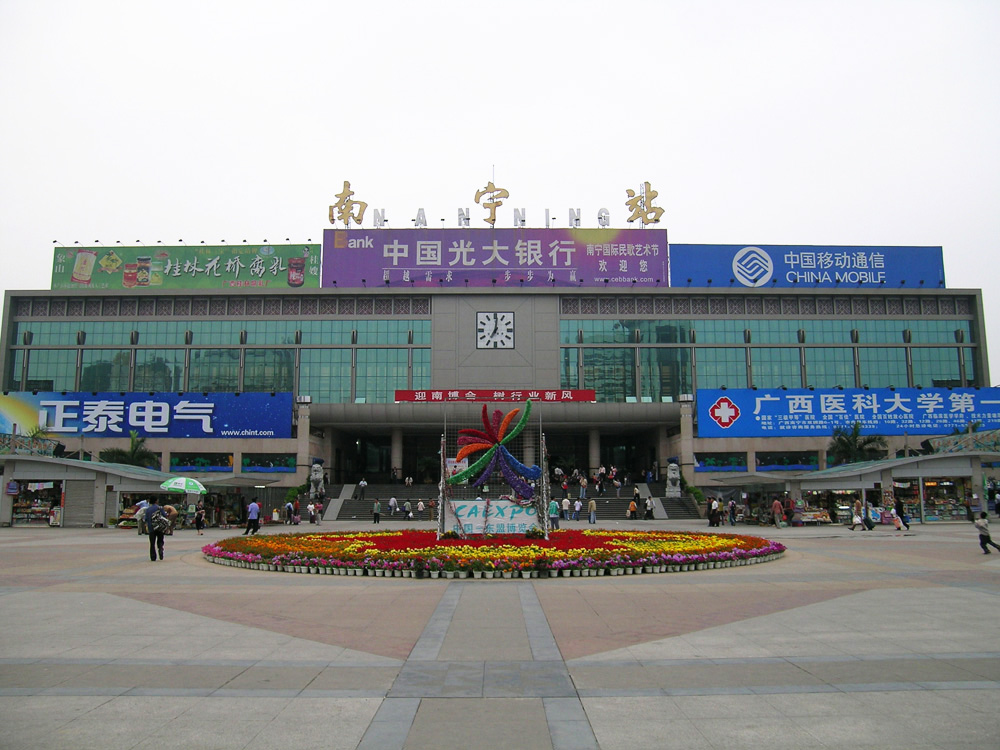
- Front view of the station building

General information
- Location: Xixiangtang District, Nanning, Guangxi; China
- Coordinates: 22°49′45.5″N 108°18′40.5″E
- Operated by: CR Nanning
- Lines: Nanning–Kunming railway Hunan–Guangxi railway Nanning–Fangchenggang railway Nanning–Guangzhou railway Liuzhou–Nanning intercity railway Yunnan–Guangxi railway Nanning–Pingxiang high-speed railway
- Platforms: 7 (14 tracks)

History
- Opened: 1951

Services
Preceding station	China Railway High-speed	Following station
Nanning East towards Liuzhou	Liuzhou–Nanning intercity railway	Terminus
Preceding station	China Railway	Following station
Nanning East towards Hengyang	Hunan–Guangxi railway	Jinjicun towards Pingxiang
Nanning East towards Beijing West	Beijing–Nanning–Hanoi	Fusui towards Gia Lâm
Preceding station	Nanning Metro	Following station
Baicangling towards Shibu	Line 1	Chaoyang Square towards Nanning East Railway Station
Mingxiu Lu towards Xijin	Line 2	Chaoyang Square towards Tanze
Location

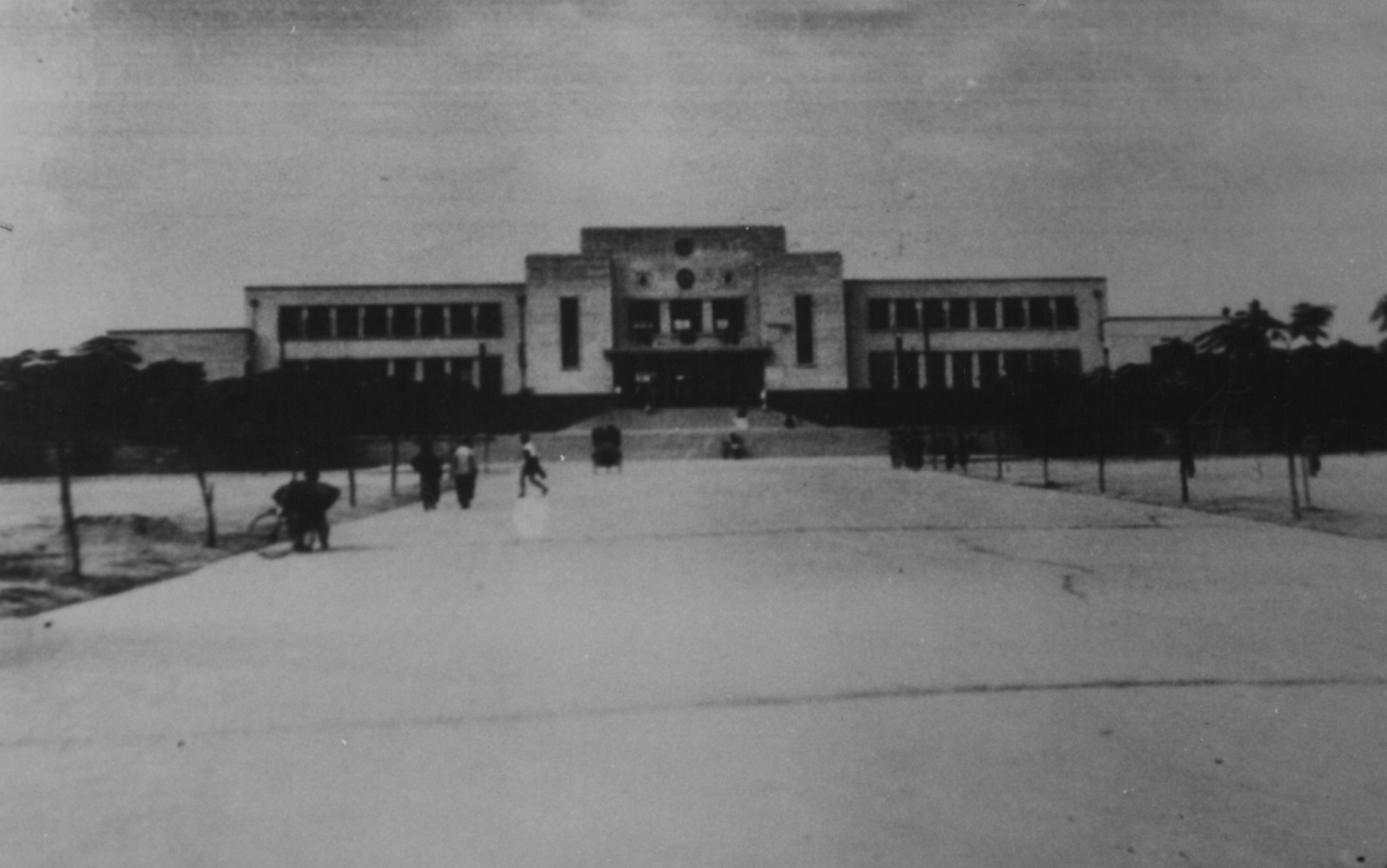
The station building in 1951

Nanning railway station (Chinese: 南宁站 / 南宁火车站; pinyin: Nánníng Zhàn / Nánníng Huǒchē Zhàn) is the main railway station serving the city of Nanning, the capital of Guangxi Zhuang Autonomous Region, China. It is located in the city centre, at 82 Zhonghua Road, in the district of Xixiangtang.

== Overview ==
The station opened in February 1951 and the upgrade of building and platforms, to allow high-speed train services also, was completed in December 2013. It is the junction point of the Nanning–Kunming railway, the Hunan–Guangxi railway, the Nanning–Fangchenggang railway, the Nanning–Guangzhou railway, the Liuzhou–Nanning Intercity railway, the Yunnan–Guangxi railway, and the Nanning–Pingxiang high-speed railway.

== Services ==
- Rapid transit: Nanning Metro lines 1 and 2 are both connected to the station.
- Regional services: the station is connected to Liuzhou, Guilin, Wuzhou, Guigang, Qinzhou, Fangchenggang, Beihai and others.
- National services: the station is connected to Beijing, Shanghai, Guangzhou, Chengdu, Kunming, Xiamen, Nanjing, Shenzhen, Wuhan, Xi'an, Qingdao, Changsha and other major cities. One of this services is the "Beijing-Nanning Through Train".
- International services: the station is served by the "Beijing-Nanning-Hanoi Through Train", that connects the Chinese and the Vietnamese national capitals. In long-term plan, the Nanning–Singapore economic corridor and of the Kunming–Singapore Rail Network, would connect Nanning Station to Cambodia, Malaysia and Singapore.

== Notable events ==
In February 2019, Nanning railway station was the scene of a viral video of North Korea's leader Kim Jong-un smoking a cigarette during a break on his way to the Hanoi Summit with then American president Donald Trump.

== See also ==
- Nanning Rail Transit
- Nanning Locomotive Depot
