= Litang, Guangxi =

Litang 黎塘镇
- Town
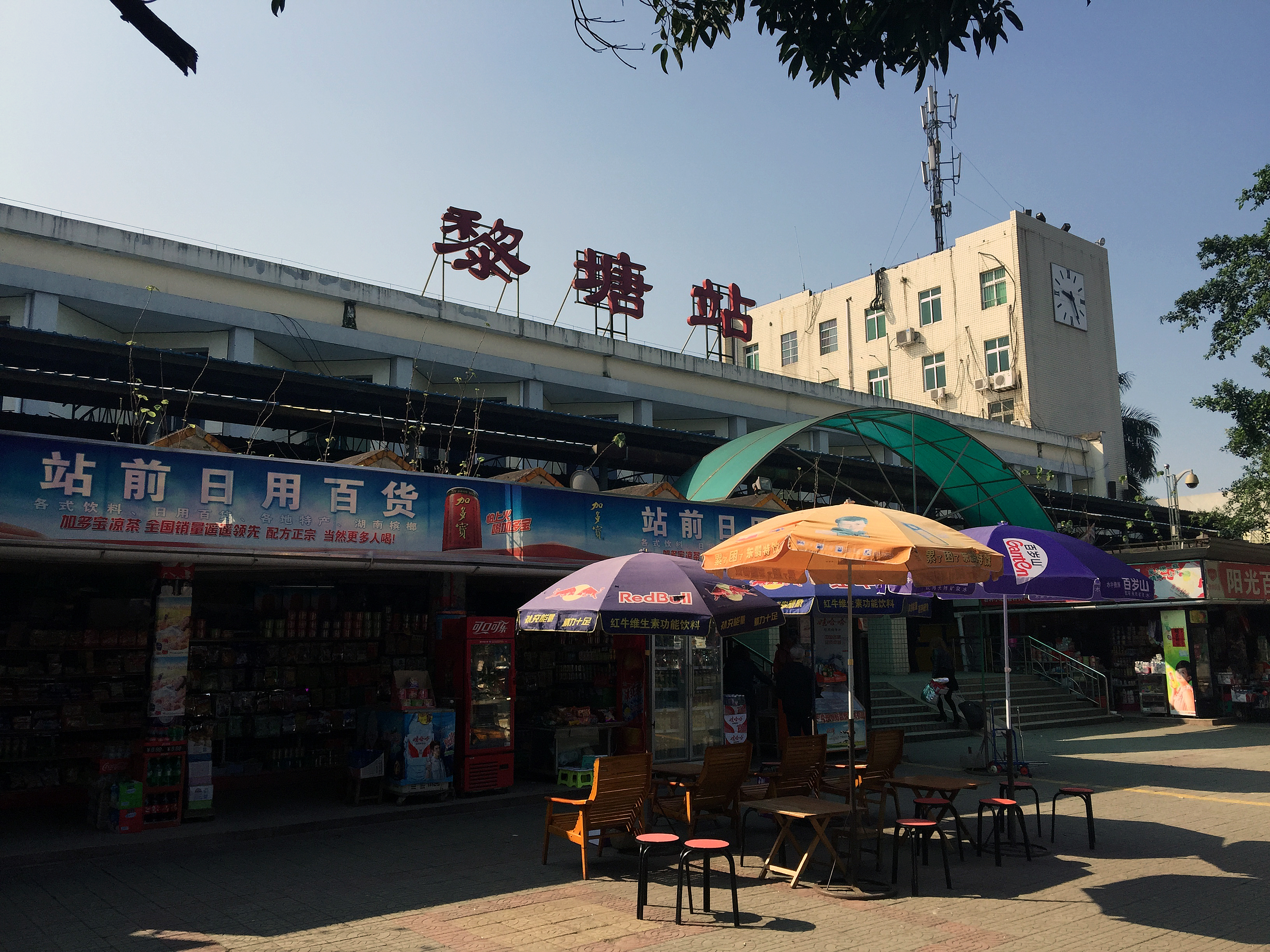
- Litang railway station

- Location in Guangxi
- Coordinates: 23°12′13″N 109°07′29″E
- Country: People's Republic of China
- Autonomous Region: Guangxi
- Prefecture-level city: Nanning
- County: Binyang County
- Time zone: UTC+8 (China Standard)

Litang (Chinese: 黎塘; pinyin: Lítáng) is a town in Binyang County, Guangxi Autonomous Region, China. As of 2018, it has 9 residential communities and 14 villages under its administration. It is a railway junction for the Hunan–Guangxi, Litang–Zhanjiang and Litang–Qinzhou Railways.
