= Hunan–Guangxi railway =

Railway line in southern China

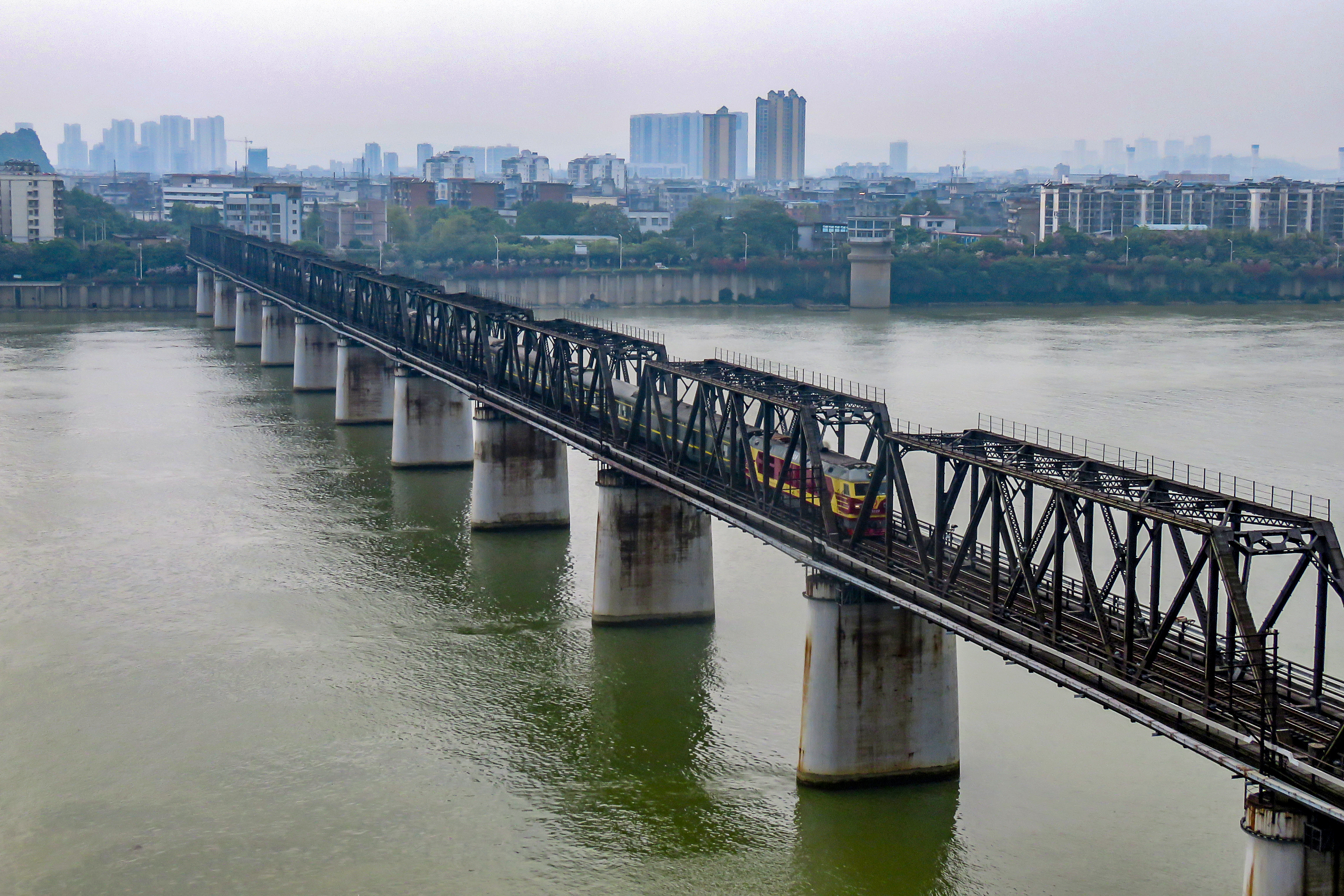
- Liu River bridge in Liuzhou

Overview
- Other name(s): Xianggui railway
- Native name: 湘桂铁路
- Status: Operational
- Owner: China Railway
- Locale: South Central China
- Termini: Hengyang; Friendship Pass
- Stations: 47

Service
- Type: High-speed rail; Inter-city rail; Freight rail
- System: China Railway High-speed (Hengyang–Liuzhou–Nanning); China Railway
- Operator(s): China Railway Guangzhou Group; China Railway Nanning Group

Technical
- Line length: 1,013 km (629 mi)
- Number of tracks: 2 (Liuzhou–Nanning); 1 (remainder)
- Track gauge: 1,435 mm (4 ft 8 1/2 in) standard gauge
- Electrification: 25 kV/50 Hz AC overhead catenary
- Operating speed: 120 km/h (75 mph)

The Hunan–Guangxi railway or Xianggui railway (simplified Chinese: 湘桂铁路; traditional Chinese: 湘桂鐵路; pinyin: xiāngguì tiělù), is a mostly electrified railroad in southern China that connects Hunan province and the Guangxi Zhuang Autonomous Region. The shortform name of the line, Xianggui, is named after the Chinese short names of Hunan, Xiang and Guangxi, Gui. The line runs 1,013 km (629 mi) from Hengyang in Hunan to Friendship Pass on Guangxi's border with Vietnam. Major cities along route include Hengyang, Yongzhou, Guilin, Liuzhou, Nanning, Pingxiang, and Friendship Pass.

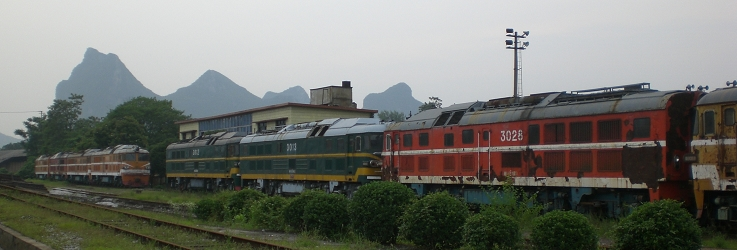
DF7D locomotives alongside the Hunan–Guangxi railway in Guilin

== History ==
The original single-track Xianggui Line was built in sections from 1937 to 1939 and 1950–1955.

In December 2008, construction began on a capacity-expansion project to a new pair of 723.7 km (450 mi) electrified tracks from Hengyang to Nanning, which would create a three-track line of 497.9 km (309 mi) between Hengyang and Liuzhou and a four-track line of 225.8 km (140 mi) between Liuzhou and Nanning. The expansion project was completed in December 2013. The new double-track from Hengyang to Liuzhou is called the Hengyang–Liuzhou intercity railway and the new double-track from Liuzhou to Nanning is called the Liuzhou–Nanning intercity railway.

As of May 2014, the southernmost section of the Xianggui Line, from Nanning to Pingxiang on the Vietnamese border, is undergoing capacity expansion to accommodate high-speed trains.

== Passenger service ==
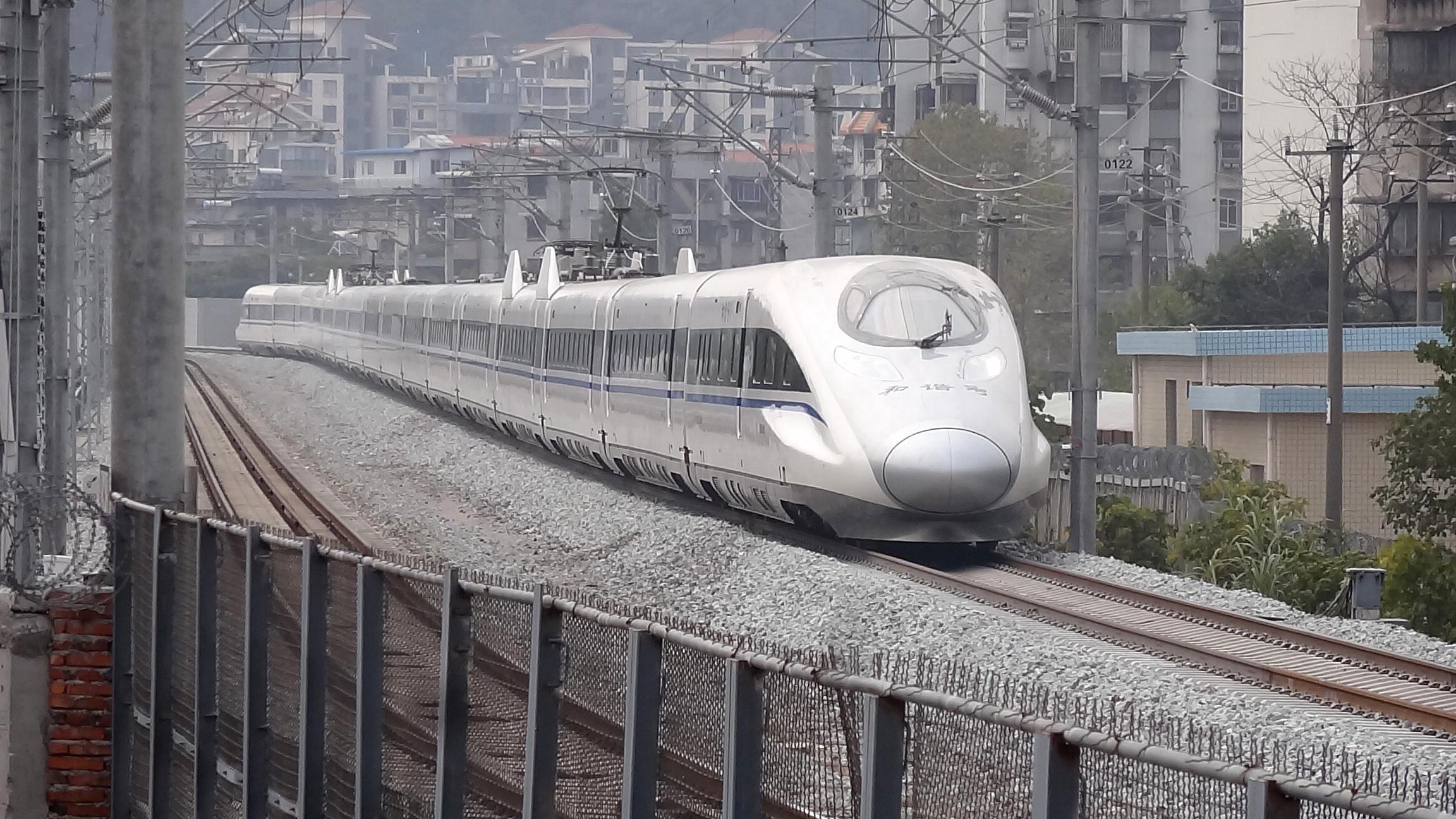
CRH380A high-speed train at Guilin

The Hunan–Guangxi railway is used by most trains traveling from Beijing, Shanghai, and other points in eastern China to Guangxi (Guilin, Nanning) and to the Vietnamese border. This includes the Beijing–Nanning–Hanoi through train.

At the end of 2013, high-speed passenger service was introduced on the Hunan–Guangxi railway as well. A direct G-series trains from Beijing makes it to Guilin in about 10.5 hours. D-series trains continue from Guilin to Nanning, taking less than 3 hours for the trip.

== Rail connections ==
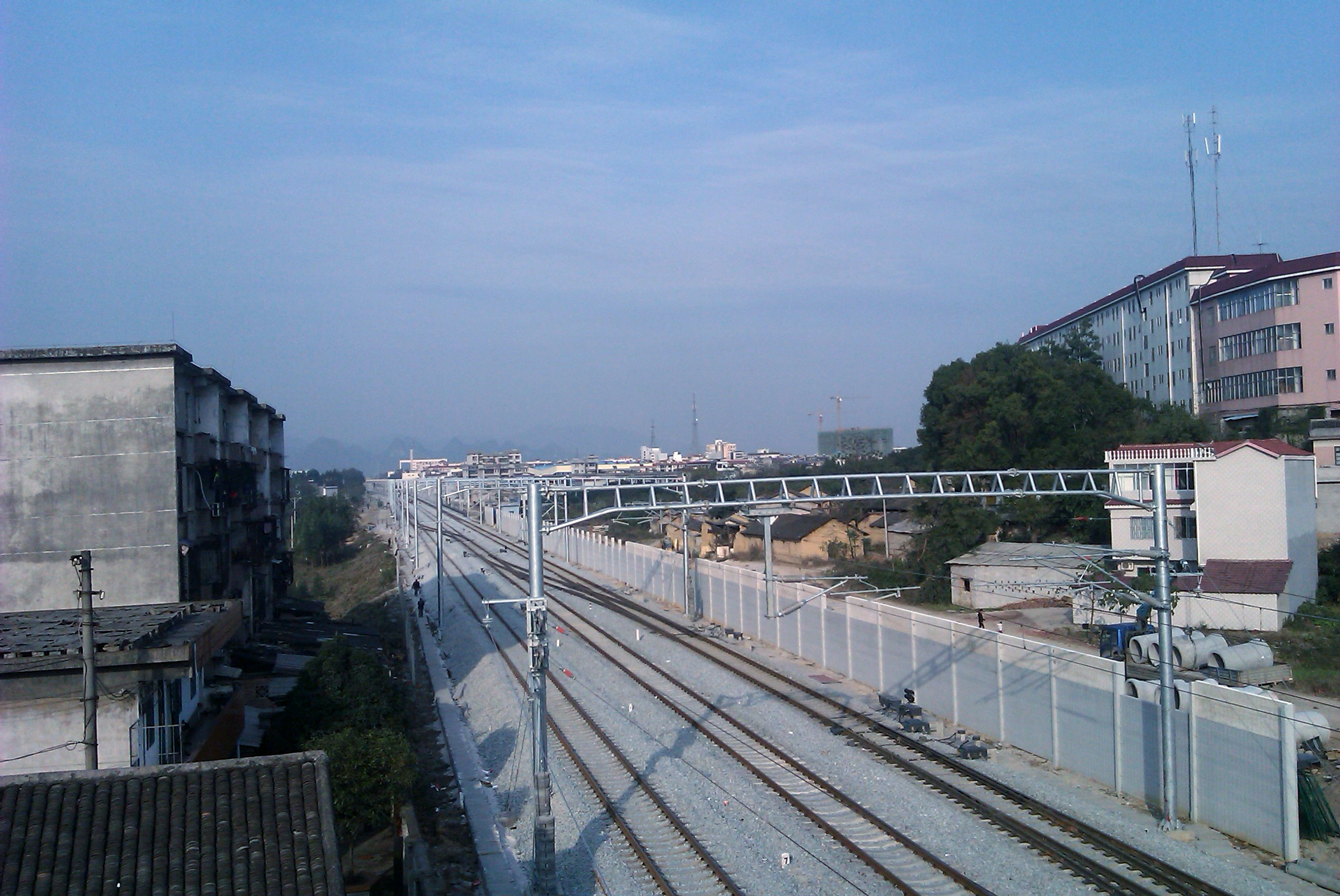
The electrified tracks of the Xianggui railway at Lingchuan County, north of Guilin, in Guangxi

- Hengyang: Beijing–Guangzhou railway
- Yongzhou: Luoyang–Zhanjiang railway
- Liuzhou: Jiaozuo–Liuzhou railway, Guizhou–Guangxi railway
- Litang Township: Litang–Zhanjiang railway, Litang–Qinzhou railway
- Nanning: Nanning–Kunming railway; branch line to Qinzhou and Beihai
- Pingxiang: Hanoi–Đồng Đăng Railway

== See also ==
- List of railways in China
