= Liuzhou–Nanning intercity railway =

Railway line in China

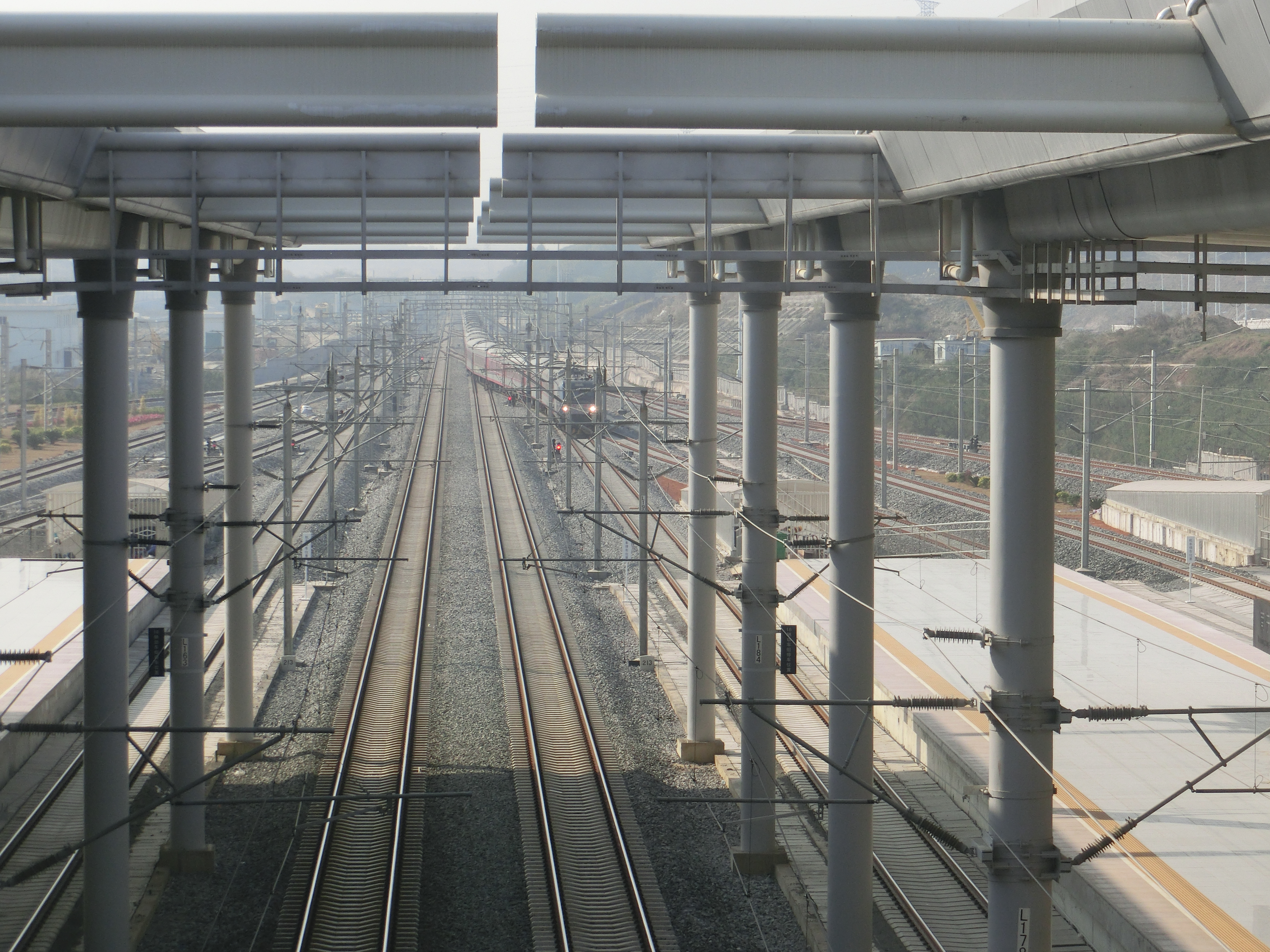
- Tracks of Liuzhou–Nanning intercity railway at Nanning East railway station

Overview
- Native name: 柳南城际铁路
- Status: Operational
- Locale: Liuzhou; Nanning
- Termini: Liuzhou; Nanning
- Stations: 5

Service
- Type: High-speed rail
- System: China Railway High-speed
- Services: 1
- Operator(s): CR Nanning

History
- Opened: 30 December 2013

Technical
- Line length: 226 km (140 mi)
- Character: CR Nanning
- Track gauge: 1,435 mm (4 ft 8 1/2 in) standard gauge
- Minimum radius: 5,500 m (3.4 mi)
- Electrification: 25 kV 50 Hz AC (Overhead line)
- Operating speed: 250 km/h (155 mph) (maximum)
- Maximum incline: 1.2%

Liuzhou–Nanning intercity railway is a high-speed railway in South-Western China. It connects the provincial capital of Nanning to the north east of Guangxi province. It also connects with the Hengyang–Liuzhou intercity railway, allowing for diverse connections with distant destinations, such as Wuhan, Shanghai, and Beijing.

== History ==
Construction commenced in 2009 and was completed in mid 2013. It was opened for service on 28 December 2013. It is part of a network of railways that opened on the same day, connecting Nanning to Beihai on the coast.

== Route ==
The 226 km (140 mi) route has a designed maximum speed of 250 km/h (155 mph).
