= China Railway Nanning Group =

Chinese railway operator

China Railway Nanning Group Co., Ltd.
- Company type: state-owned enterprise
- Industry: Railway operations
- Predecessor: Nanning Railway Administration
- Founded: 19 November 2017
- Headquarters: 21 Fuziling Road, Qingxiu, Nanning, Guangxi, China
- Area served: Guangxi; 2 railways in Guangdong
- Owner: Government of China
- Parent: China Railway
- Website: Official Weibo Website

China Railway Nanning Group
- Simplified Chinese: 中国铁路南宁局集团
- Traditional Chinese: 中國鐵路南寧局集團
Transcriptions
Standard Mandarin
- Hanyu Pinyin: Zhōngguó Tiělù Nánníng Jú Jítuán

Nanning Railway Administration
- Simplified Chinese: 南宁铁路局
- Traditional Chinese: 南寧鐵路局
Transcriptions
Standard Mandarin
- Hanyu Pinyin: Nánníng Tiělù Jú

CR Nanning
- Simplified Chinese: 宁铁
- Traditional Chinese: 寧鐵
Transcriptions
Standard Mandarin
- Hanyu Pinyin: Níngtiě

China Railway Nanning Group, officially abbreviated as CR Nanning or CR-Nanning, formerly, Nanning Railway Administration is a subsidiary group under the umbrella of the China Railway Group (formerly the Ministry of Railway). The railway administration was reorganized as a company in November 2017.

It is responsible for operations of the railway network within Guangxi and Guangdong provinces.

== History ==
- January 1, 1953, the establishment of the Liuzhou Railway Authority of Ministry of Railways of the People's Republic of China.
- August 29, 1958, Liuzhou Railway Administration changed the Liuzhou Railway Bureau.
- November 16, 2007, Liuzhou Railway Bureau officially renamed the Nanning Railway Bureau.

== Subordinate Agencies ==
=== Passenger segment ===
- Nanning passenger segment (Liuzhou passenger segment merged with Nanning passenger segment)

=== Depot ===
- Nanning Depot
- Nanning South Depot
- Liuzhou Depot

=== Locomotive Depot ===
==== Existing locomotive depot ====
- Liuzhou Locomotive Depot
- Nanning Locomotive Depot

==== Revoked locomotive depot ====
- Guilin Locomotive Depot (Incorporated into Liuzhou Locomotive Depot)
- Jinchengjiang Locomotive Depot (Incorporated into Liuzhou Locomotive Depot)
- Rong'an Locomotive Depot (Incorporated into Liuzhou Locomotive Depot)
- Yulin Locomotive Depot (Incorporated into Nanning Locomotive Depot)

== Hub stations ==
- Nanning
  - Nanning, Nanning South, Nanning East
- Liuzhou
  - Liuzhou, Liuzhou South
- Guilin
  - Guilin, Guilin North
