= 2020 in rail transport =

This article lists events related to rail transport that occurred in 2020.

Passenger rail ridership plummeted worldwide amid the COVID-19 pandemic; many services were reduced in frequency or discontinued outright.

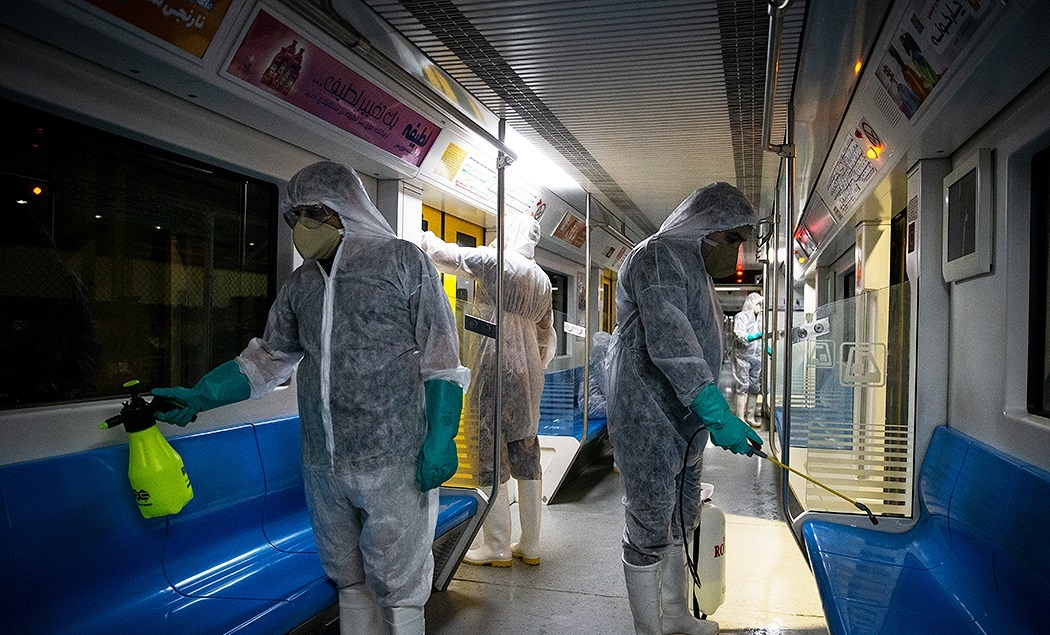
Workers disinfect a Tehran Metro carriage against COVID-19, February 2020

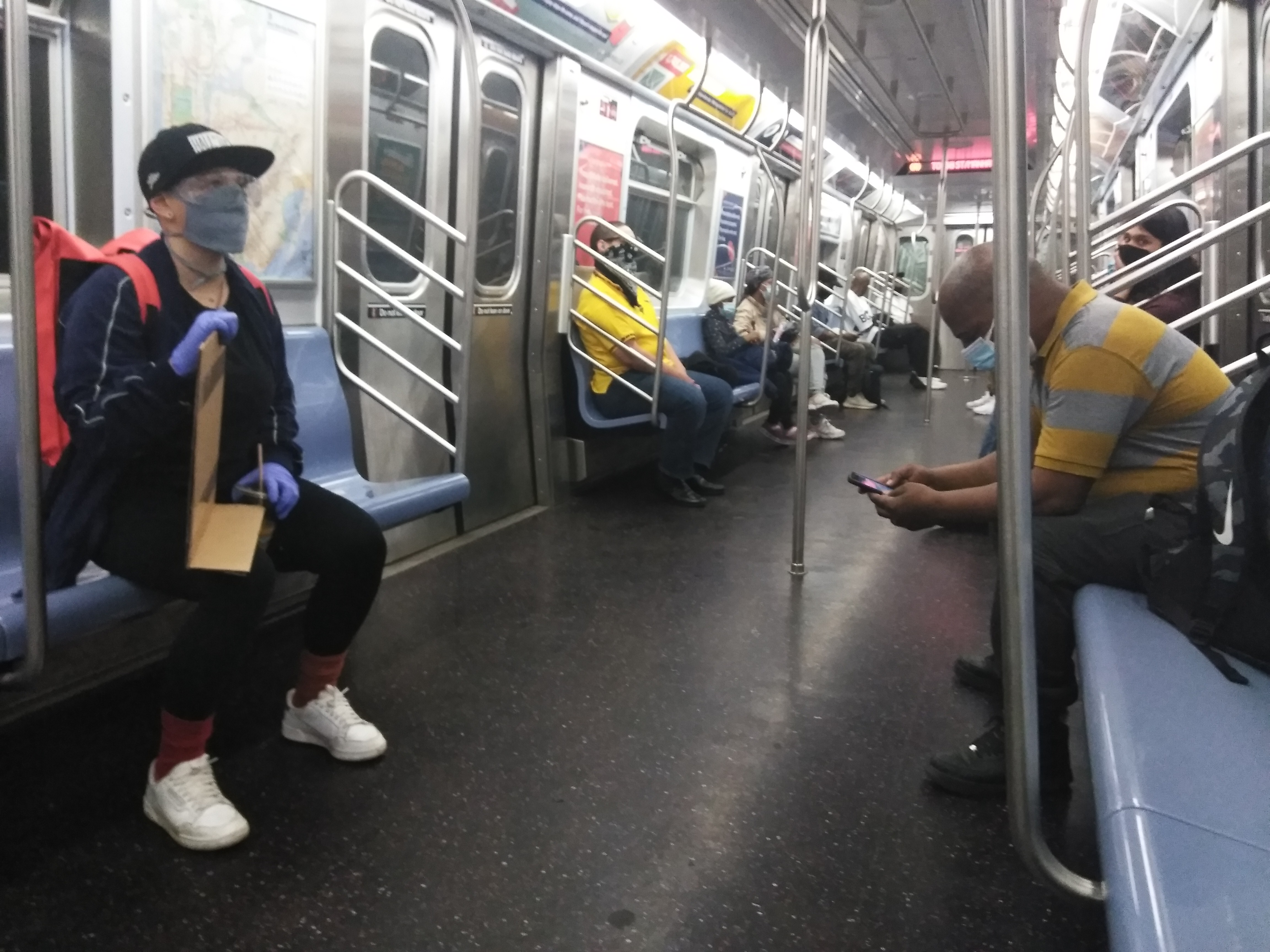
Social distancing on the New York City Subway, May 2020

== Events ==
=== January ===
- (Australia) January 5 – The Carlingford Line in Sydney was permanently closed after 132 years of service for conversion to light rail.
- January 10
  - (China) – The tracks connecting Changsha–Zhuzhou–Xiangtan intercity railway and Shimen–Changsha railway opened.
  - – Metro Express (Mauritius) is commercially opened, being the first tram system in the island state of Indian Ocean.
- (China) January 20 – Northern section of Shijiazhuang Metro Line 3 opened.
- (United States) January 26 – SEPTA temporarily discontinues the Girard Avenue Trolley in Philadelphia for a period of at least 18 months due to rolling stock maintenance issues as well as track repairs and highway expansion.
- (India) January 28 – Nagpur Metro's Aqua Line began service.
- January 29 – NZR V class steam locomotive no. 127 (built in Manchester, England, 1885) is recovered from the Ōreti River in New Zealand by the Lumsden Heritage Trust.
- January 31
  - (Singapore) – Thomson–East Coast MRT Line Stage 1 opened.
  - (Taiwan) – Opening of Taipei Metro Circular Line (First Section).

=== February ===
- (Italy) February 6 – Livraga derailment: A Frecciarossa train derails at speed at Ospedaletto Lodigiano on the Milan–Bologna line, killing two drivers and injuring 31 passengers.
- (Hong Kong) February 14 – Tuen Ma Line Phase 1 opened.
- (Australia) February 20 – Wallan derailment: An XPT derailed while passing a turnout near Wallan, Victoria. There were 2 fatalities and 39 injuries, 3 of which were serious injuries.
- February 29 – Luxembourg introduces free travel on internal public transport, including 2nd class on Société Nationale des Chemins de Fer Luxembourgeois rail services.

=== March ===
- March 1
  - (Japan) – 700 Series Shinkansen retired from the Tokaido Shinkansen.
  - (United Kingdom) – Northern Trains, a publicly owned operator of last resort, takes over the Northern passenger train operating franchise in England from Arriva Rail North.
- (France) March 5 – 2020 Ingenheim derailment.
- (Japan) March 13 – last day of operations for Super View Odoriko services. JR East phasing out the 251 series.
- March 14
  - (Japan) – Takanawa Gateway Station in Tokyo commences operation on the Yamanote and Keihin Tohoku Lines.
  - (Japan) – JR East begins Saphir Odoriko limited express services between Tokyo or Shinjuku and Izukyū Shimoda Station, using the new E261 series.
- (United Kingdom) March 22 – Manchester Metrolink Trafford Park Line opened.
- March 27
  - (Russia) – the northern section of the Nekrasovskaya line of the Moscow Metro opened, with 6 new stations.
  - (United States) – 2020 New York City Subway fire.
- (China) March 30 – Train T179 from Ji'nan to Guangzhou derailed in Chenzhou, Hunan after hitting a landslide rubble, causing 1 person dead and 127 persons injured.

=== April ===
- (Australia) April 3 – CBD and South East Light Rail Kingsford branch opened.
- (China) April 23 – Hangzhou Metro Line 16 and two extensions of Line 5 (Jinxing to Liangmulu, Shanxian to Guniangqiao) opened.
- (China) April 29 – First phase of Shenyang Metro Line 10 opened.

=== May ===
- (India) May 8 – Aurangabad railway accident.
- (Netherlands) May 22 – Hooghalen train crash.
- (Poland) – Agreement to operate steam locomotives from Wolsztyn expires – it was the final mainline passenger steam locomotive service left in the world.

=== June ===
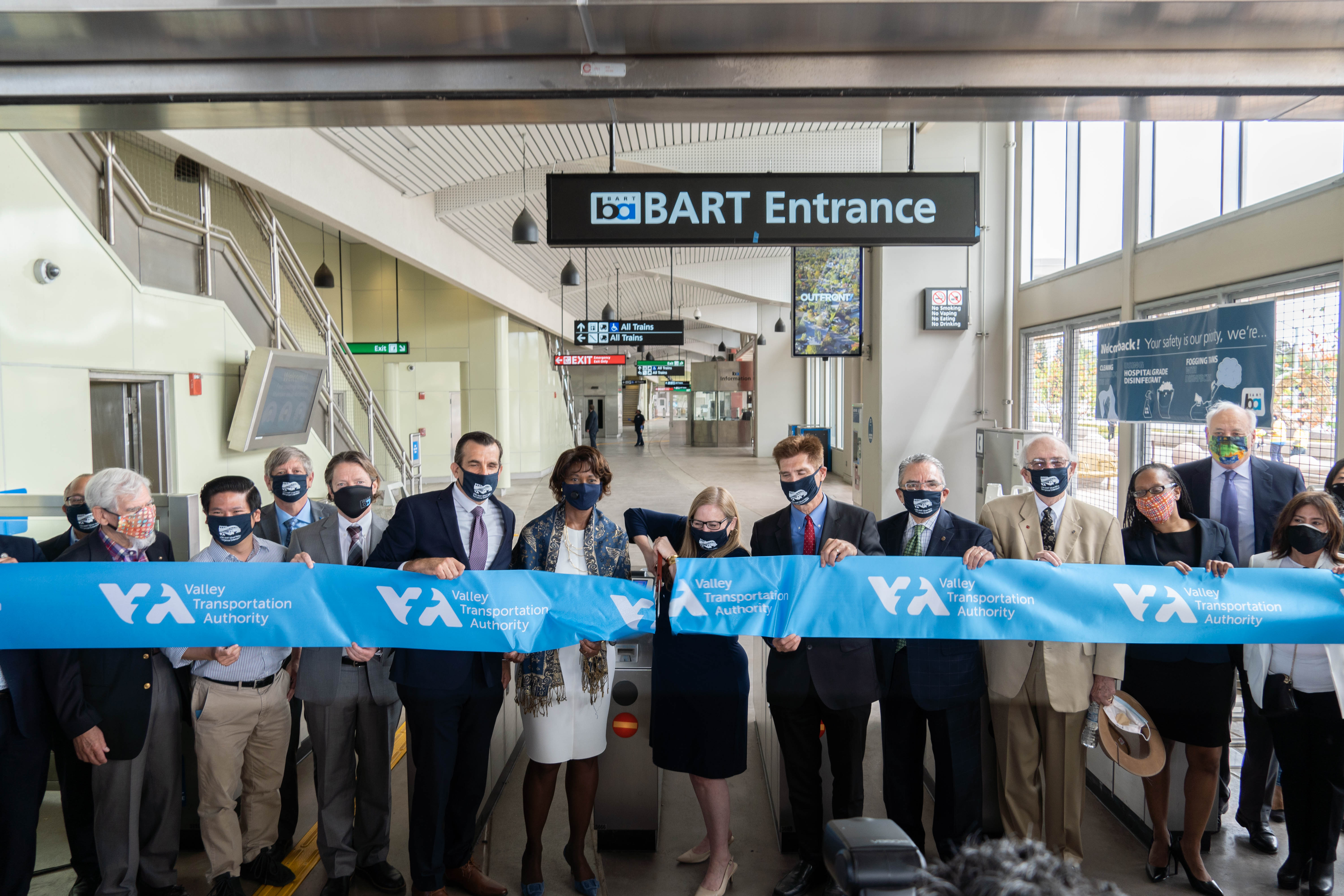
Masked dignitaries cut a ribbon to officially open the BART Berryessa/North San José station in San Jose, California, June 12, 2020.

- (United States) June 13 – The Berryessa segment of the Silicon Valley BART extension is opened to the public.
- June 28
  - (China) – Hefei – Hangzhou segment of the Shangqiu–Hangzhou high-speed railway opened to passenger services.
  - (China) – Line 3 and Line 5 of Changsha Metro opened to the public.
- June 30
  - (China) – Tongmi line service and the western extension of Sub-Central line service of Beijing Suburban Railway began operation.
  - (China) – Chifeng–Harqin Zuoyi high-speed railway and the Golmud–Korla railway Qinghai section began operation.

=== July ===
- July 1
  - (China) – Shanghai–Suzhou–Nantong railway began passenger and freight services.
  - (Japan) – N700S trains began operation on the Tokaido and Sanyo Shinkansen lines.

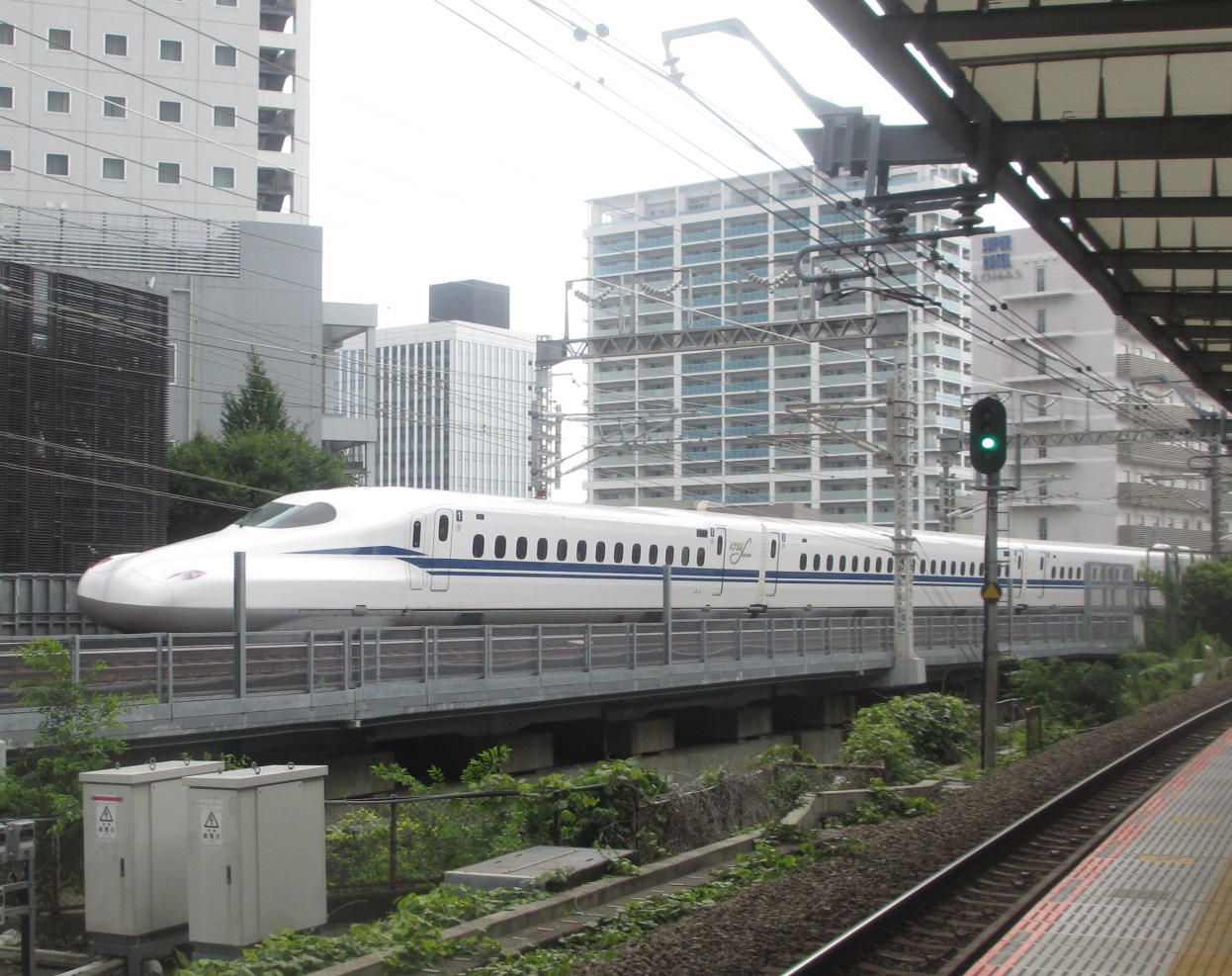
N700S Shinkansen trainset at Musashi-Kosugi Station, July 2020

- (Greece) July 7 – Three new stations open on the Athens Metro.
- (China) July 8 – Anshun–Liupanshui intercity railway opened to passenger services.
- (Czech Republic) July 7, July 15 – 2 train crashes with fatalities in one week.
- (Portugal) July 31 – Soure train crash.

=== August ===
- (South Korea) August 8 – Line 5 of the Seoul Subway is extended to Hanam Pungsan.
- (United Kingdom) (Scotland) August 12 – Stonehaven derailment.
- August 18
  - (China) – Line 6 and Line 10 of the Shenzhen Metro opened.
  - (China) – Phase 1 of Zhuji intercity railway (Zhuhai to Zhuhai Changlong section) opened.
- (Italy) August 19 – Carnate derailment.
- August 26
  - (China) – Line 2 of the Shijiazhuang Metro opened.
  - (Bulgaria) – Line 3 of the Sofia Metro opened.
  - (United Kingdom) (Wales) – Llangennech derailment.
- (Uzbekistan) August 29 – Two new stations of the Tashkent Metro open.
- (Uzbekistan) August 30 – The first section of the Circle line of the Tashkent Metro officially opens.

=== September ===
- (Switzerland) September 4 – Official opening of Ceneri Base Tunnel; further testing and certifications continue before full operations start in December.
- (Mexico) September 12 – Line 3 in the Guadalajara light rail system opened.
- (Romania) September 15 – Line M5 of the Bucharest Metro opened.
- (Brazil) September 16 – Two stations of Federal District Metro open, 106 Sul Cine Brasília and 110 Sul.
- September 22
  - (United States) – N Line commuter rail in Denver, Colorado opened.
  - (United Kingdom) – Transport Secretary, Grant Shapps, announces that DfT is abolishing Passenger Rail Franchising.
- (China) September 23 – Line 4 and Line 6 (Phase 2) of the Kunming Metro opened.
- September 27
  - (China) – Line 18 of Chengdu Metro (South Railway Station to Sancha section) opened.
  - (China) – The remaining section of Line 3 (Yinfeng line) of Ningbo Rail Transit opened.

=== October ===
- (China) October 1 – Line 2 of the Hohhot Metro opened.
- (Russia) October 3 – passenger train arrives at Pereslavl-Zalessky for the very first time.
- (United States) October 5 – Amtrak begins reducing frequencies on most long-distance routes from daily to tri-weekly.
- (Pakistan) October 25 – The first line of the Lahore Metro, the Orange Line, opened for revenue service. It is the first metro system in the country.
- (Germany) October 26 – Berlin Brandenburg Airport railway station opens to passengers.
- (Spain) October 27 – The Madrid–Galicia high-speed rail line is opened to passengers between Zamora and Pedralba de la Pradería (110 km).
- October 28
  - (China) – The Shenzhen Metro opens the east extension of Line 2, the southern extension of Line 3, the northern extension of Line 4 and the Phase 1 of Line 8.
  - (China) – The Wuxi Metro opens the Line 3 (Sumiao–Shuofang Airport segment).
  - (Turkey) – Opening of the Istanbul Metro Line M7.

=== November ===
- November 2 – De Akkers metro station crash: an empty metro train on the Rotterdam Metro crashed through the buffer stop at De Akkers metro station in the city of Spijkenisse, the Netherlands. The lead car of the train came to rest partially on the sculpture of a whale's tale erected in front of the station, preventing the train from falling to the street below.
- (Belarus) November 7 – The Zelenaluzhskaya line of the Minsk Metro opens, with automated Stadler trains.
- (Taiwan) November 15 – Danhai light rail extension to Tamsui Fisherman's Wharf.

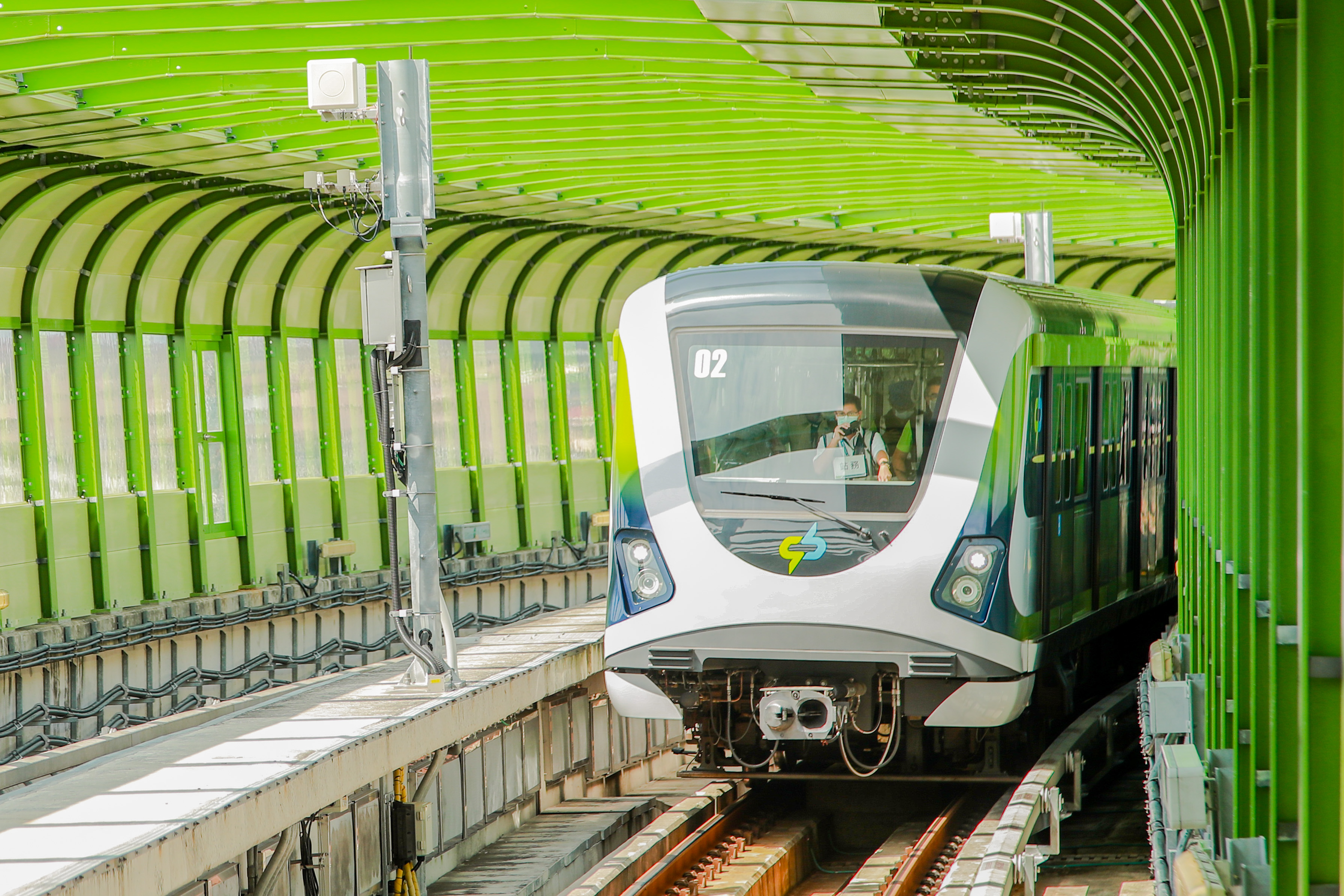
Taichung MRT Green line testing, September 2020

- (Taiwan) November 16 – Taichung MRT Green line opens, though service is temporarily shut down on November 22 due to faulty couplers.
- (China) November 23 – The Nanning Metro opened extension segment of Line 2 and Line 4.
- (China) November 26 – Opening of the northern extension of Line 8 of Guangzhou Metro.
- (China) November 28 – The Xuzhou Metro opens Line 2.
- (China) November 30 – The Guangdong Intercity Railway opens Guangzhou–Qingyuan intercity railway (Huadu–Qingcheng segment) and Guangzhou–Foshan circular intercity railway (Huadu–Baiyun Airport North segment).
- (United Kingdom) November – The Wales & Borders franchise introduces the Class 769 Flex multiple unit into passenger service, the first tri-mode to operate in the UK.

=== December ===
- (China) December 1 – The Yanqing Branch of Beijing–Zhangjiakou intercity railway begins operation, the Badaling–Yanqing segment of Beijing Suburban Railway Line S2 resumed its operation.
- (Germany) December 4 – U5 and U55 lines of Berlin U-Bahn merge with three new stations opening.
- (China) December 11 – The southern segment of Lianyungang–Zhenjiang high-speed railway begins operation.
- (China) December 12 – The Taiyuan–Jiaozuo high-speed railway begins operation.

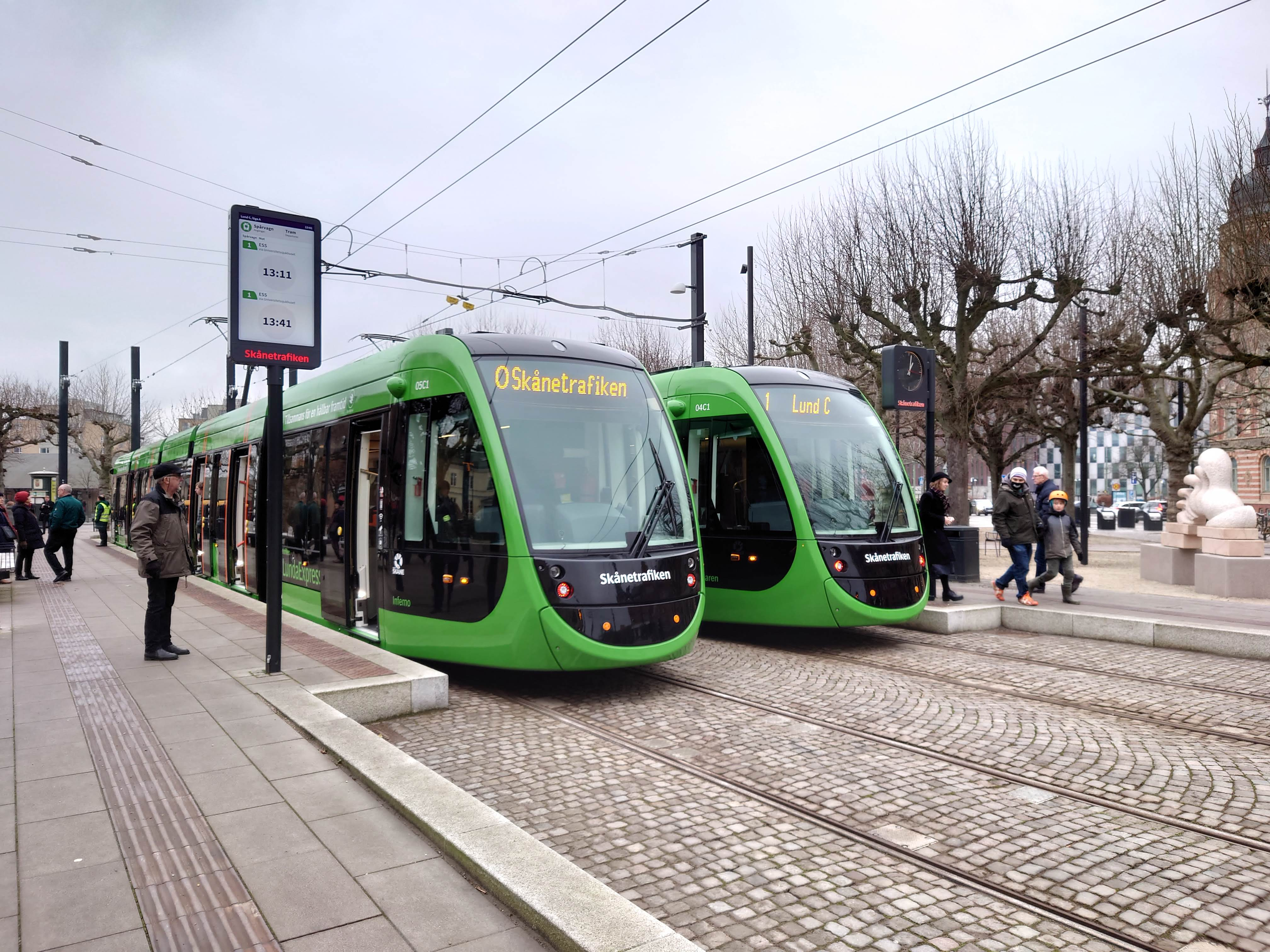
Two Lund tramway CAF Urbos 3 vehicles on the first day of traffic in Lund, 13 December 2020.

- December 13
  - (Sweden) - Lund tramway opened.
  - (Sweden) – SJ Öresund takes over operation of the Øresundståg from Transdev
- December 14
  - (France) – First segment of the Grand Paris Express opened, as Paris Métro Line 14 is extended to Saint-Ouen.
  - – Open-access operators able to start passenger operations in Spain.
- (Thailand) December 16 – Gold Line (Bangkok) opened.
- (China) December 18 – Chengdu Metro opens Line 6, Line 8, Line 9, Line 17 and the extension of Line 18.
- (Japan) December 21 – E235 series trains enter service on the Sōbu Rapid and Yokosuka Lines.
- (China) December 22 – The Hefei–Anqing segment of Hefei–Jiujiang high-speed railway begins operation.
- (China) December 23 – The Ningbo Rail Transit opens Line 4.
- (China) December 24 – The Qingdao Metro opens Line 1 and Line 8.
- December 26
  - (China) – Shanghai Metro Line 10 (Phase 2) and the first section of Line 18, Taiyuan Metro Line 2, Nanchang Metro Line 3, Zhengzhou Metro Line 3 and Line 4, Hefei Metro Line 5 opens.
  - (China) – Wuzhong to Xi'an North segment of Yinchuan–Xi'an high-speed railway, Fuzhou–Pingtan railway and Wuhan–Xiantao intercity railway begins operation.
- (China) December 27 – The southern segment of Beijing–Xiong'an intercity railway, and the southern extension of Fuzhou Metro Line 1 begin operation.
- (China) December 28 – The Xi'an Metro opens Line 5, Line 6, Line 9; The extension of Guangzhou Huangpu Tram Line 1 began operation.
- December 29 - The Flinders line in South Australia begins operation, having been extended from Tonsley.
- (China) December 30 – The Dali–Lincang railway begins operation, the Hangzhou Metro opened the Line 1 extension to Hangzhou Xiaoshan International Airport, Line 6 and Line 7.
- December 31
  - (Russia) – Elektrozavodskaya (Bolshaya Koltsevaya line) in Moscow opens as a one-station extension of Nekrasovskaya line.
  - (Canada) – The Deux-Montagnes line closes to be converted from commuter rail to light metro as part of the Reseau express metropolitain network.
  - (United States) – Deadline for mainline American railroads to implement positive train control systems on their networks.

== Industry awards ==
=== Japan ===
Awards presented by Japan Railfan Club

- 2020 Blue Ribbon Award: Seibu Railway 001 series Laview
- 2020 Laurel Prize: JR Shikoku 2700 Series

=== North America ===
Awards presented by Railway Age magazine

- 2020 Railroader of the Year: Patrick J. Ottensmeyer (KCS)

== Deaths ==
=== October ===
- October 18 – Alan S. Boyd, First United States Secretary of Transportation (1967–1969) and later President of Amtrak until 1982 (born 1922).
