= Line 3 (Nanning Metro) =

Metro line in Nanning, China

- 3
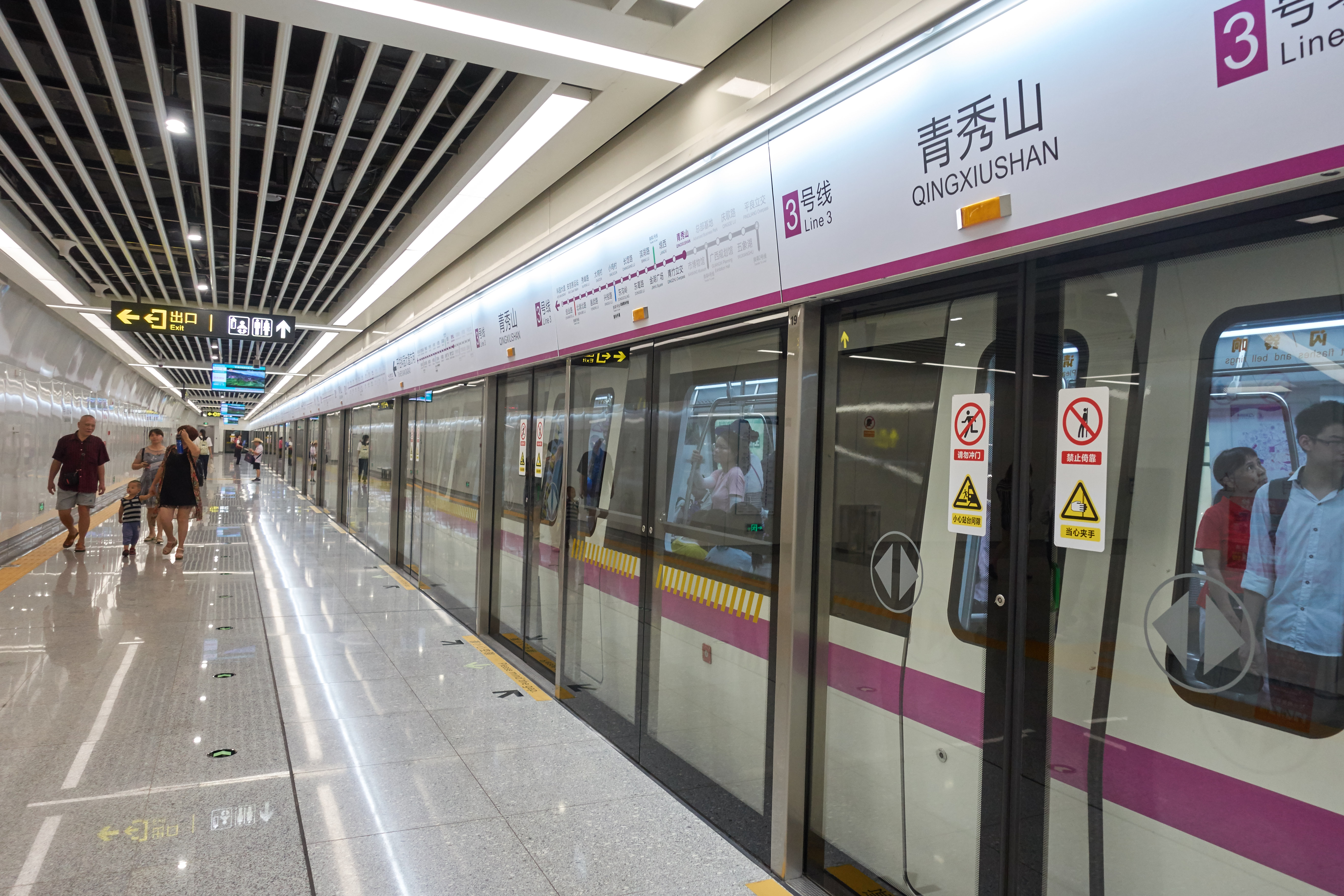
- Qingxiushan station

Overview
- Status: Operational
- Owner: Nanning
- Locale: Nanning, Guangxi, China
- Termini: Keyuan Dadao; Pingliang Overpass
- Stations: 23

Service
- Type: Rapid transit
- System: Nanning Metro
- Services: 1
- Operator(s): Nanning Rail Transit Corporation
- Rolling stock: 6-car Type B

History
- Opened: June 6, 2019; 5 years ago

Technical
- Line length: 27.9 km (17.34 mi)
- Number of tracks: 2
- Character: Underground
- Track gauge: 1,435 mm (4 ft 8 1/2 in)

Line 3

Chinese name
- Simplified Chinese: 南宁地铁3号线
- Traditional Chinese: 南寧地鐵3號線
Transcriptions
Standard Mandarin
- Hanyu Pinyin: Nánníng Dìtiě Sān Hào Xiàn

Zhuang name
- Zhuang: Nanzningz Didez 3 Hauhsienq

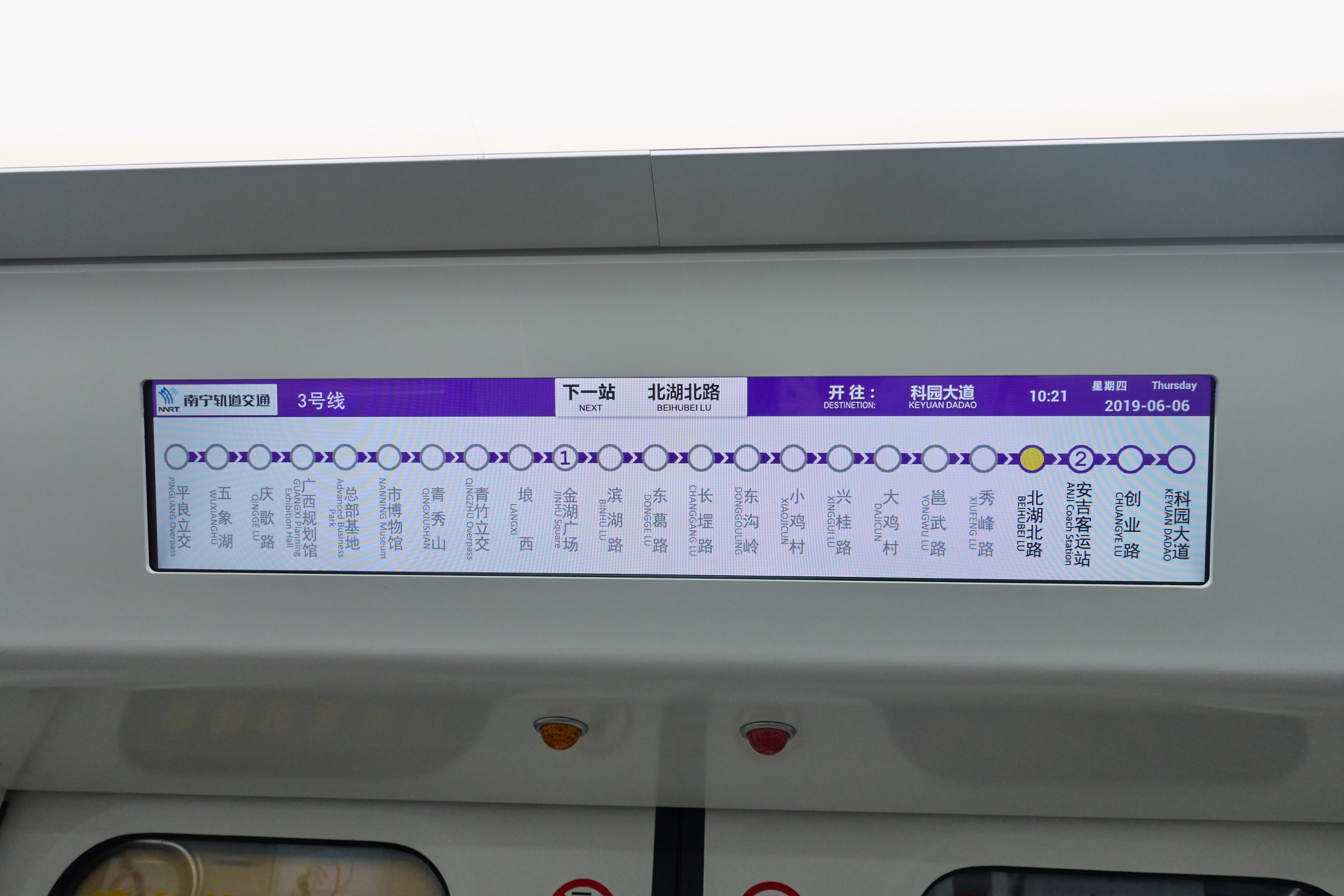
Line 3 train LCD

Line 3 of the Nanning Metro is a rapid transit line in Nanning. The line opened on 6 June 2019. The line is 27.9 km long with 23 stations.

== Opening timeline ==
Segment	Commencement	Length	Station(s)	Name
Keyuan Dadao — Pingliang Overpass	6 June 2019	27.9 km (17.34 mi)	22	
Donggouling	10 September 2020	Infill station	1	

== Stations ==
Station name			Transfer	Distance km	Location
English	Chinese	Zhuang	Transfer	Distance km	Location
Keyuan Dadao	科园大道	Daihloh Gohyenz			Xixiangtang
Chuangye Lu	创业路	Roen Cangyez			Xixiangtang
Anji Coach Station	安吉客运站	Camh Yinhhek Anhgiz	2		Xixiangtang
Beihubei Lu	北湖北路	Roen Baek Bwzhuz			Xixiangtang
Xiufeng Lu	秀峰路	Roen Siufungh			Xixiangtang
Yongwu Lu	邕武路	Roen Yunghvuj			Xixiangtang / Xingning
Dajicun	大鸡村	Dagihcunh			Xingning
Xinggui Lu	兴桂路	Roen Hinghgvei			Xingning
Xiaojicun	小鸡村	Siujgihcunh	5		Xingning
Donggouling	东沟岭	Dungruhlingj			Xingning
Changgang Lu	长堽路	Roen Cangzgangh			Xingning
Dongge Lu	东葛路	Roen Dunghgoz			Qingxiu
Binhu Lu	滨湖路	Roen Binhhuz			Qingxiu
Jinhu Square	金湖广场	Ginhhuz Gvangjcangz	1		Qingxiu
Langxi	埌西	Langsih			Qingxiu
Qingzhu Overpass	青竹立交	Cinghcuz Lizgyauh			Qingxiu
Qingxiushan	青秀山	Cinghsiusanh			Qingxiu
Nanning Museum	市博物馆	Si Bozvuzgvanj			Liangqing
Advanced Business Park	总部基地	Cungjbu Gihdi	4		Liangqing
Guangxi Planning Exhibition Hall	广西规划馆	Gvangjsih Gveihva’gvanj			Liangqing
Qingge Lu	庆歌路	Roen Ginggoh			Liangqing
Wuxianghu	五象湖	Vujsienghuz			Liangqing
Pingliang Overpass	平良立交	Bingzliengz Lizgyauh	2		Liangqing
