= Nanning Metro =

Rapid transit system in Nanning, China

Overview
- Locale: Nanning, Guangxi, China
- Transit type: Rapid Transit
- Number of lines: 5
- Number of stations: 106
- Daily ridership: 791,100 (2021 daily avg.) 1.4326 million (31 December 2020 record)
- Annual ridership: 289 million (2021)
- Website: http://www.nngdjt.com/

Operation
- Began operation: June 15, 2016; 10 years ago
- Operator: Nanning Rail Transport Limited
- Number of vehicles: 72 (2023)

Technical
- System length: 132.1 km (82.1 mi)
- Track gauge: 1,435 mm (4 ft 8 1/2 in)
System map
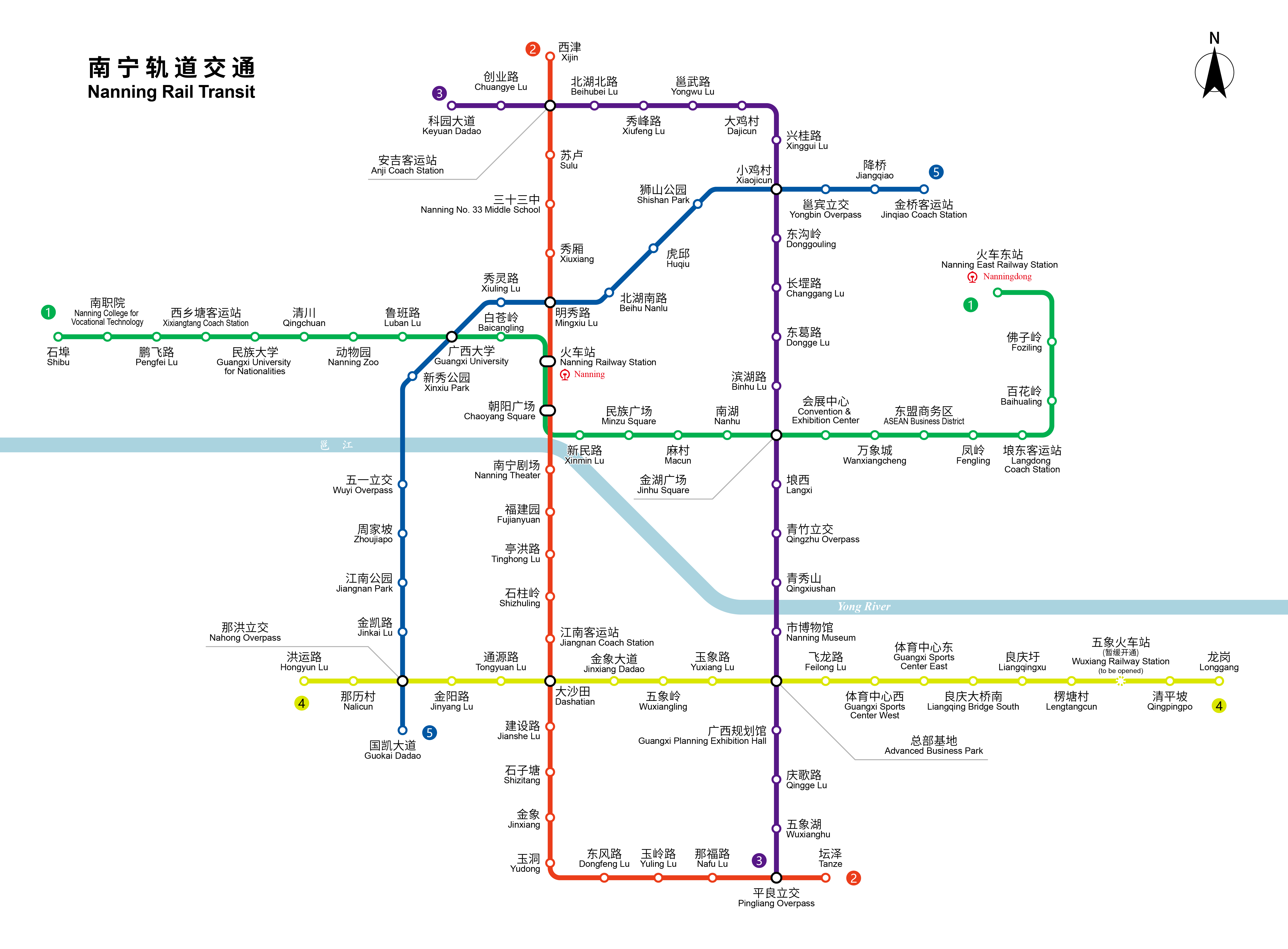

Nanning Rail Transit

Chinese name
- Simplified Chinese: 南宁轨道交通
- Traditional Chinese: 南寧軌道交通
Transcriptions
Standard Mandarin
- Hanyu Pinyin: Nánníng Guǐdào Jiāotōng

Alternative Chinese name
- Simplified Chinese: 南宁地铁
- Traditional Chinese: 南寧地鐵
Transcriptions
Standard Mandarin
- Hanyu Pinyin: Nánníng Dìtiě

Zhuang name
- Zhuang: Nanzningz Didez

Nanning Metro or Nanning Rail Transit (NNRT) is a rapid transit system in Nanning, the capital of Guangxi Zhuang Autonomous Region in China.

== History ==
Line 1 officially started construction on December 29, 2011. The first 11.2 km section, from Nanhu to Nanning East railway station, began operation on June 28, 2016. The line opened fully on December 28, 2016. It is 32.1 km long, with 25 stations. Line 2 started construction in 2012 and was completed on December 28, 2017. Line 3 opened in June 2019. Line 4 opened in November 2020. Line 5 opened on December 16, 2021.

With the opening of Line 5, Nanning became the seventh city in China, and the first in Southern China to open and operate a fully automated subway line.

== Lines in operation ==
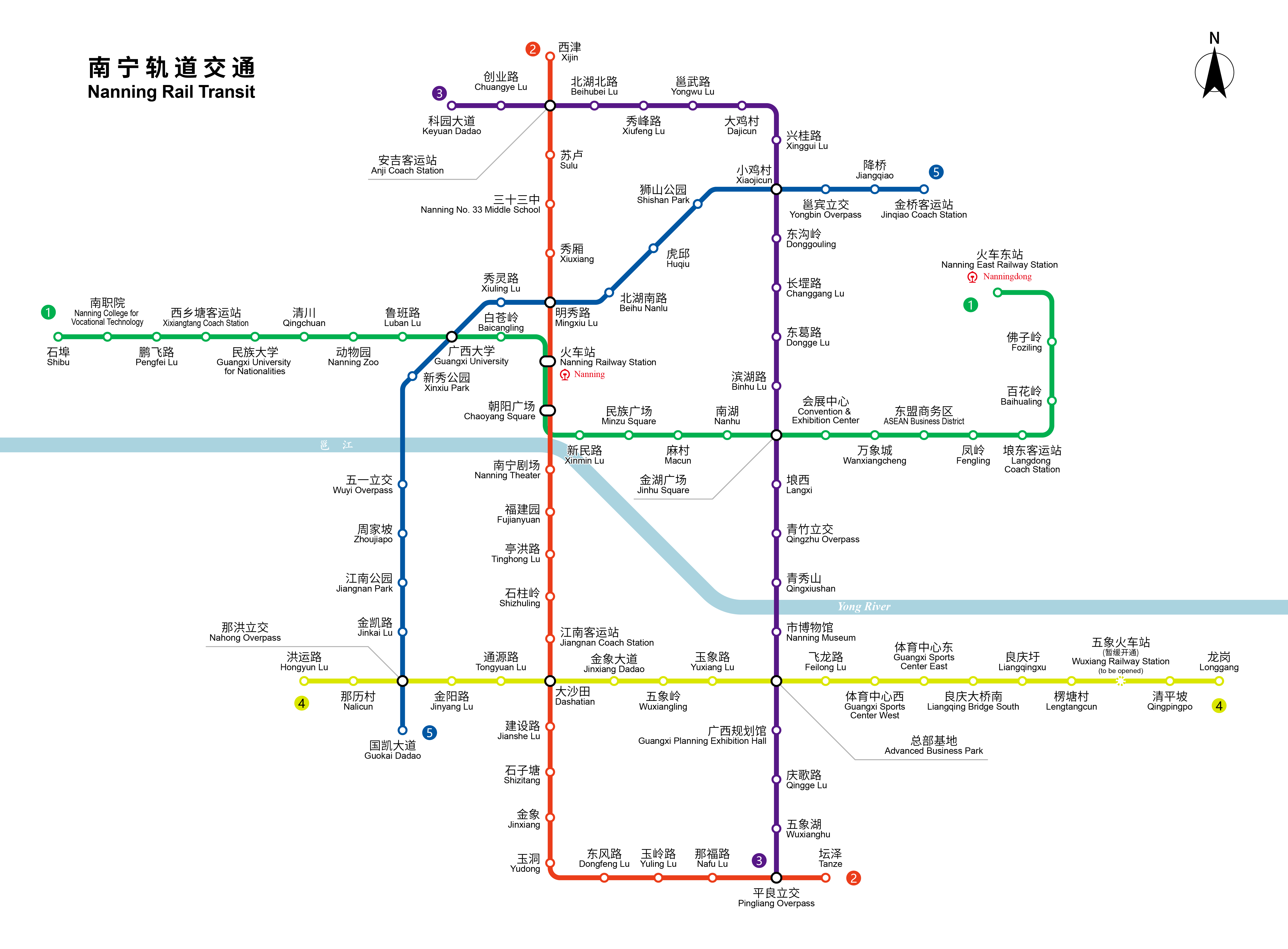

Line	Terminals (District)		Commencement	Newest Extension	Length km	Stations
1	Shibu (Xixiangtang)	Nanning East railway station (Qingxiu)	June 28, 2016	December 28, 2016	32.1	25
2	Xijin (Xixiangtang)	Tanze (Liangqing)	December 28, 2017	November 23, 2020	27.3	23
3	Keyuan Dadao (Xixiangtang)	Pingliang Overpass (Liangqing)	June 6, 2019	—	27.9	23
4	Hongyun Lu (Jiangnan)	Longgang (Liangqing)	November 23, 2020	September 26, 2025	24.6	18
5	Guokai Dadao (Jiangnan)	Jinqiao Coach Station (Xingning)	December 16, 2021		20.2	17
Total					132.1	106

== Future expansion ==
Line 6 Phase 1 started construction on December 26, 2023. Line 6 Phase 1 is an east-west crosstown line that is 27.9 km long with 21 stations, and will open in 2028.

It is planned that there will be four vertical and four horizontal lines totaling 252 km of subway. The system is projected to carry over 5 million passengers per day.

== See also ==
- List of metro systems
- Urban rail transit in China
