= Line 1 (Nanning Metro) =

Metro line in Nanning, China

- 1
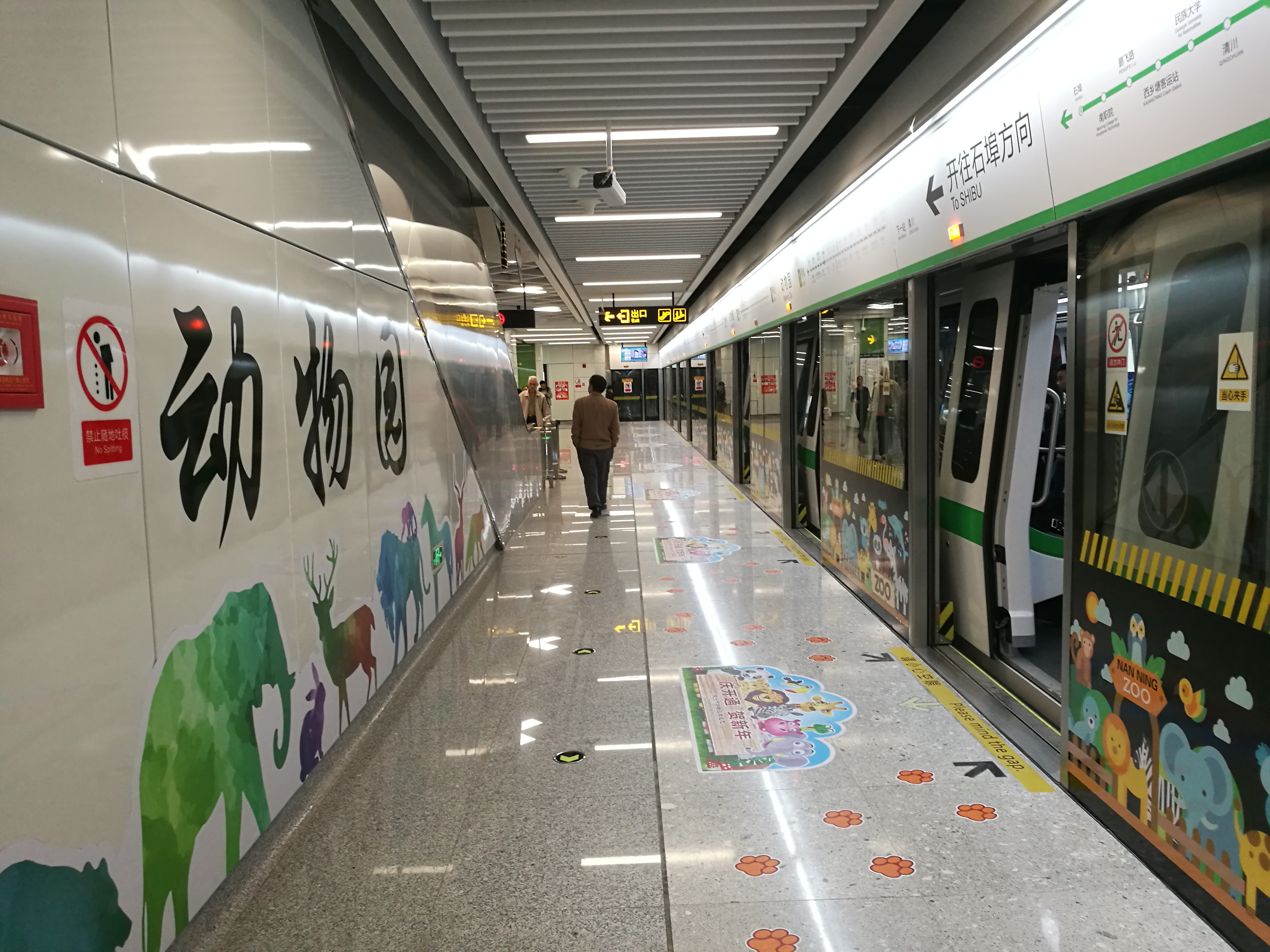
- Nanning Zoo station

Overview
- Status: In Operation
- Owner: Nanning
- Locale: Nanning, Guangxi, China
- Termini: Shibu; Nanning East Railway Station
- Stations: 25

Service
- Type: Rapid transit
- System: Nanning Metro
- Services: 1
- Operator(s): Nanning Rail Transit Corporation

History
- Opened: 28 June 2016; 8 years ago

Technical
- Line length: 32.1 km (19.95 mi)
- Number of tracks: 2
- Character: Underground
- Track gauge: 1,435 mm (4 ft 8 1/2 in)

Line 1

Chinese name
- Simplified Chinese: 南宁地铁1号线
- Traditional Chinese: 南寧地鐵1號線
Transcriptions
Standard Mandarin
- Hanyu Pinyin: Nánníng Dìtiě Yī Hào Xiàn

Zhuang name
- Zhuang: Nanzningz Didez 1 Hauhsienq

Line 1 of the Nanning Metro a rapid transit line running from west to east Nanning. It opened on the 28 June 2016. This line is currently 32.1 km long with 25 stations.

== Opening timeline ==
Segment	Commencement	Length	Station(s)	Name
Nanhu — Nanning East Railway Station	28 June 2016	11.2 km (6.96 mi)	10	Phase 1 (western section)
Shibu — Nanhu	28 December 2016	20.9 km (12.99 mi)	15	Phase 1 (eastern section)

== Stations ==
Station name			Transfer	Distance km		Location
English	Chinese	Zhuang	Transfer	Distance km		Location
Shibu	石埠	Sizbu		0.00	0.00	Xixiangtang
Nanning College for Vocational Technology	南职院	Nanzciyenz		1.83	1.83	Xixiangtang
Pengfei Lu	鹏飞路	Roen Bungzfaih		1.02	2.85	Xixiangtang
Xixiangtang Coach Station	西乡塘客运站	Camh Yinhhek Sihyanghdangz		1.81	4.66	Xixiangtang
Guangxi University for Nationalities	民族大学	Minzcuz Dayoz		1.44	6.10	Xixiangtang
Qingchuan	清川	Cinghconh		2.24	8.34	Xixiangtang
Nanning Zoo	动物园	Dungvuzyenz		1.46	9.80	Xixiangtang
Luban Lu	鲁班路	Roen Lujbanh		1.64	11.44	Xixiangtang
Guangxi University	广西大学	Gvangjsih Dayoz	5	0.77	12.21	Xixiangtang
Baicangling	白苍岭	Bwzcanghlingj		1.87	14.08	Xixiangtang
Nanning Railway Station	火车站	Hojcehcan	2 NNZ	1.42	15.50	Xixiangtang
Chaoyang Square	朝阳广场	Cauzyangz Gvangjcangz	2	0.94	16.44	Xingning
Xinmin Lu	新民路	Roen Sinhminz		0.93	17.37	Qingxiu
Minzu Square	民族广场	Minzcuz Gvangjcangz		0.94	18.31	Qingxiu
Macun	麻村	Mazcunh		1.16	19.47	Qingxiu
Nanhu	南湖	Nanzhuz		1.59	21.06	Qingxiu
Jinhu Square	金湖广场	Ginhhuz Gvangjcangz	3	0.97	22.03	Qingxiu
Convention and Exhibition Center	会展中心	Veicanj Cunghsinh		1.14	23.17	Qingxiu
Wanxiangcheng	万象城	Vansiengcwngz		0.88	24.05	Qingxiu
ASEAN Business District	东盟商务区	Dunghmungz Sanghvugih		0.73	24.78	Qingxiu
Fengling	凤岭	Funglingj		1.15	25.93	Qingxiu
Langdong Coach Station	埌东客运站	Camh Yinhhek Langdungh		0.88	26.81	Qingxiu
Baihualing	百花岭	Bwzvahlingj		1.35	28.16	Qingxiu
Foziling	佛子岭	Fuzswjlingj		1.50	29.66	Qingxiu
Nanning East Railway Station	火车东站	Hojceh Dunghcan	NFZ	1.70	31.36	Qingxiu
