= Line 5 (Nanning Metro) =

Metro line in Nanning China

- 5
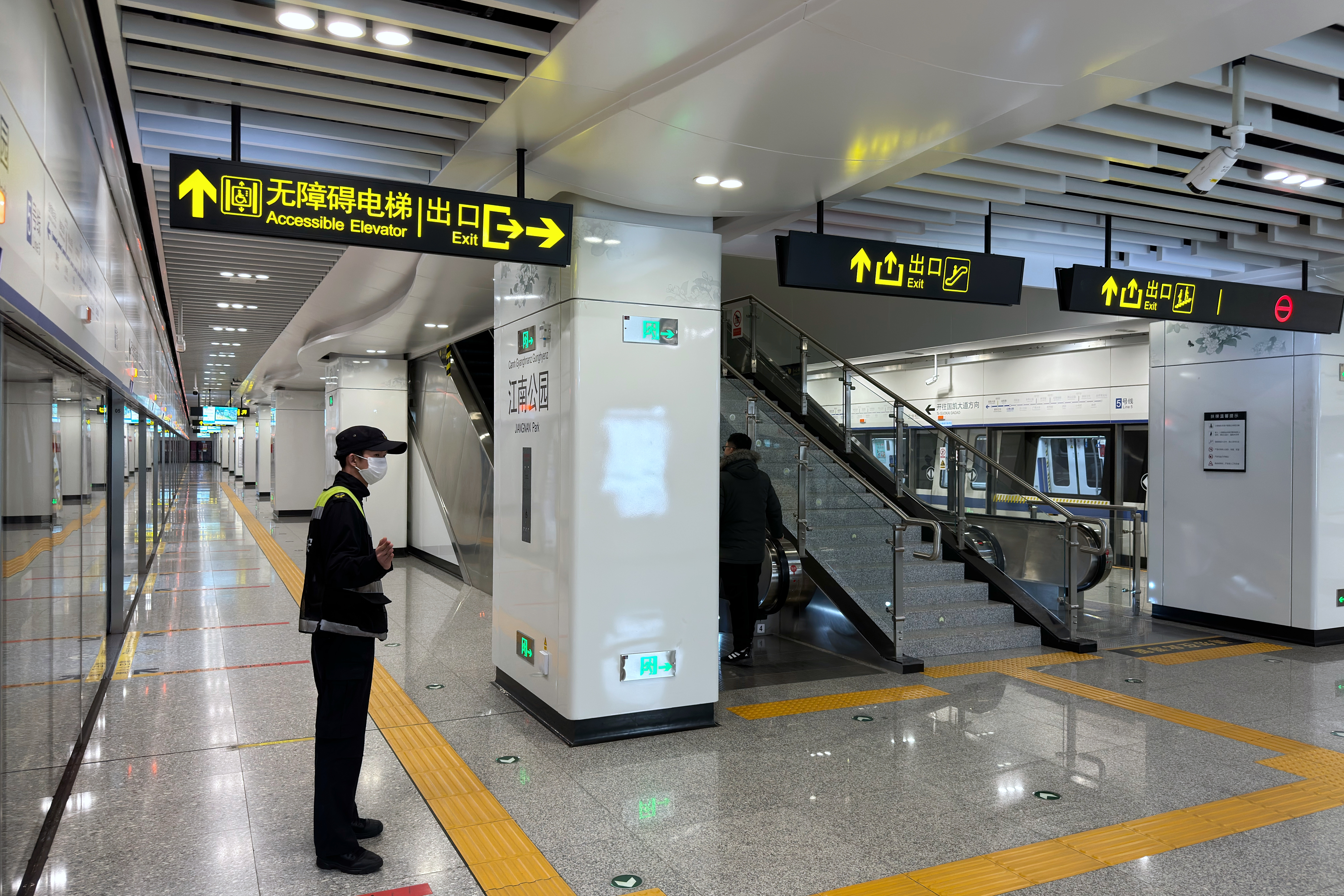
- Jiangnan Park station

Overview
- Status: Operational
- Owner: Nanning
- Locale: Nanning, Guangxi, China
- Termini: Guokai Dadao; Jinqiao Coach Station
- Stations: 17

Service
- Type: Rapid transit
- System: Nanning Metro
- Services: 1
- Operator(s): Nanning Rail Transit Corporation
- Rolling stock: 6-car Type B

History
- Opened: December 16, 2021; 3 years ago

Technical
- Line length: 20.2 km (12.55 mi)
- Number of tracks: 2
- Character: Underground
- Track gauge: 1,435 mm (4 ft 8 1/2 in)

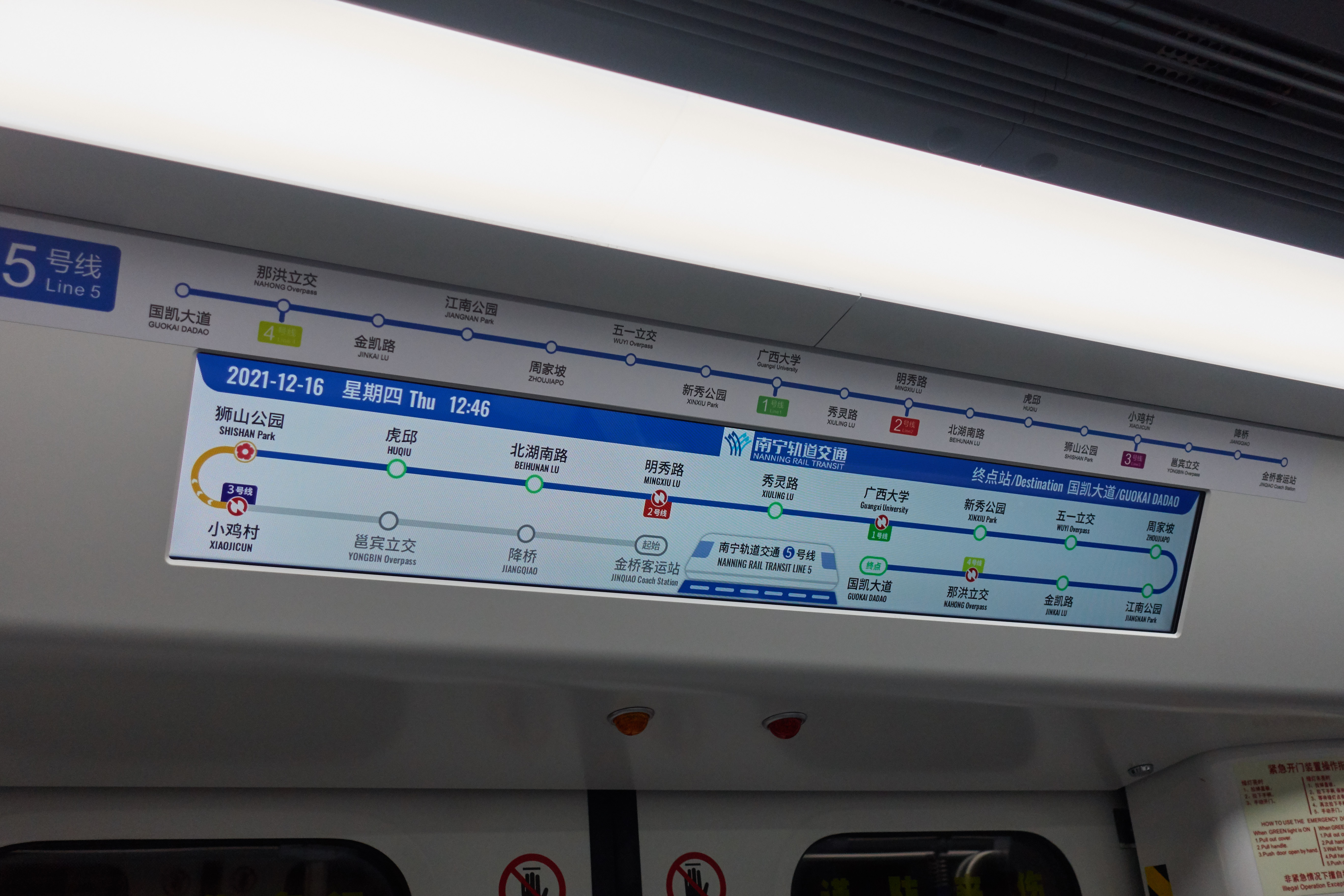
Line 5 train interior LCDs

Line 5 of the Nanning Metro is a rapid transit line in Nanning which opened on 16 December 2021. The line is 20.2 km long with 17 stations and uses driverless 6-car Type B trains.

== Opening timeline ==
| Segment | Commencement | Length | Station(s) | Name |
|---|---|---|---|---|
| Guokai Dadao — Jinqiao Coach Station | 16 December 2021 | 20.2 km (12.55 mi) | 17 | Phase 1 |

== Stations ==
| Station name | | | Transfer | Distance km | | Location |
| English | Chinese | Zhuang | Transfer | Distance km | | Location |
|---|---|---|---|---|---|---|
| Guokai Dadao | 国凯大道 | Daihloh Gozgaij | | 0 | 0 | Jiangnan |
| Nahong Overpass | 那洪立交 | Nazhungz Lizgyauh | 4 | | | Jiangnan |
| Jinkai Lu | 金凯路 | Roen Ginhgaij | | | | Jiangnan |
| Jiangnan Park | 江南公园 | Gyanghnanz Gunghyenz | | | | Jiangnan |
| Zhoujiapo | 周家坡 | Couhgyahboh | | | | Jiangnan |
| Wuyi Overpass | 五一立交 | Vujyiz Lizgyauh | | | | Jiangnan |
| Xinxiu Park | 新秀公园 | Sinhsiu Gunghyenz | | | | Xixiangtang |
| Guangxi University | 广西大学 | Gvangjsih Dayoz | 1 | | | Xixiangtang |
| Xiuling Lu | 秀灵路 | Roen Siulingz | | | | Xixiangtang |
| Mingxiu Lu | 明秀路 | Roen Mingzsiu | 2 | | | Xixiangtang |
| Beihu Nanlu | 北湖南路 | Roen Namz Bwzhuz | | | | Xixiangtang |
| Huqiu | 虎邱 | Hujgiuh | | | | Xingning |
| Shishan Park | 狮山公园 | Swhsanh Gunghyenz | | | | Xingning |
| Xiaojicun | 小鸡村 | Siujgihcunh | 3 | | | Xingning |
| Yongbin Overpass | 邕宾立交 | Yunghbinh Lizgyauh | | | | Xingning |
| Jiangqiao | 降桥 | Gyanggyauz | | | | Xingning |
| Jinqiao Coach Station | 金桥客运站 | Camh Yinhhek Ginhgyauz | | | | Xingning |
