= Line 2 (Nanning Metro) =

Metro line in Nanning, China

- 2
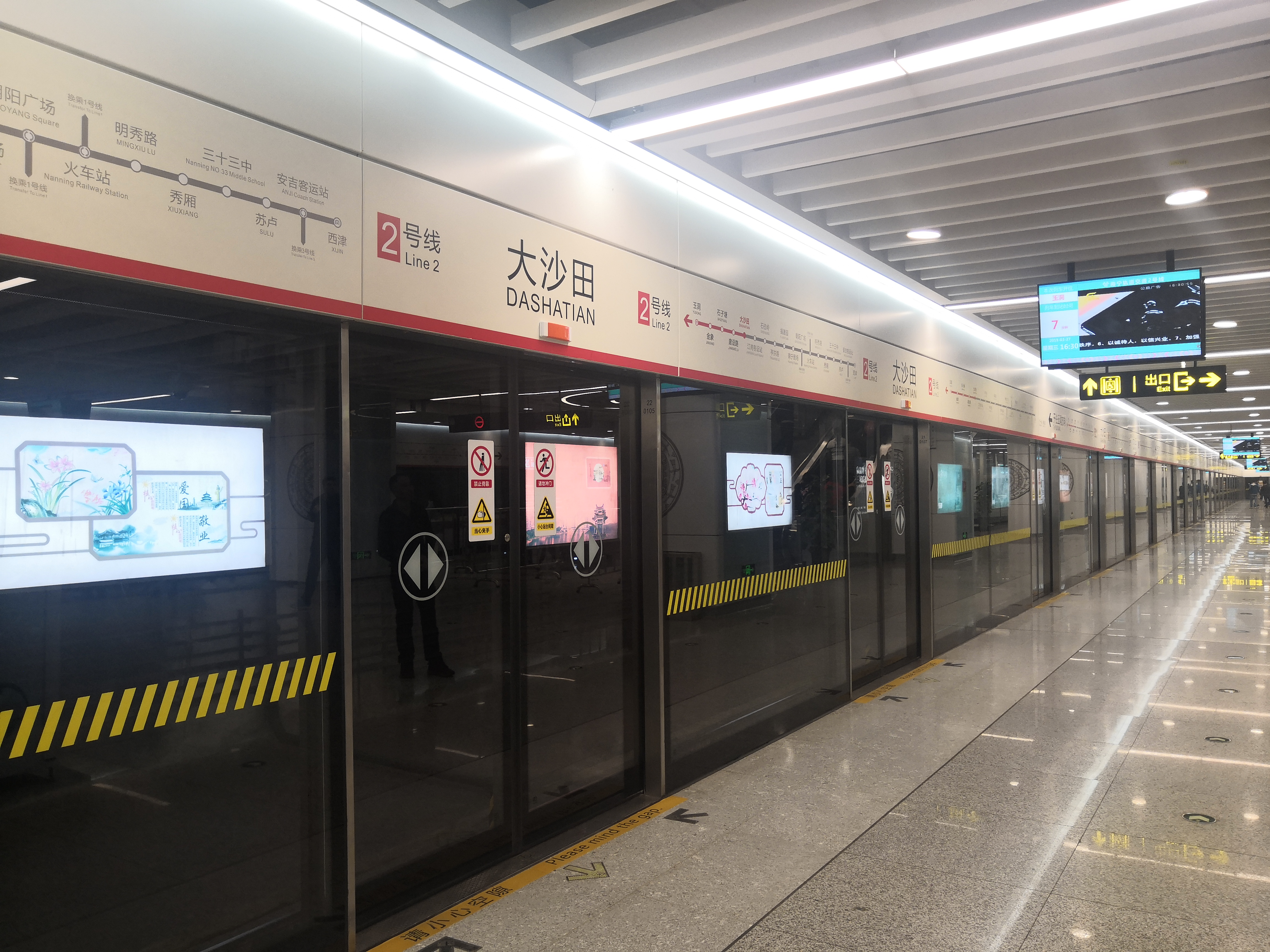
- Dashatian station

Overview
- Status: In Operation
- Owner: Nanning
- Locale: Nanning, Guangxi, China
- Termini: Xijin; Tanze
- Stations: 23

Service
- Type: Rapid transit
- System: Nanning Metro
- Services: 1
- Operator(s): Nanning Rail Transit Corporation

History
- Opened: 28 December 2017; 7 years ago

Technical
- Line length: 27.5 km (17.09 mi)
- Number of tracks: 2
- Character: Underground
- Track gauge: 1,435 mm (4 ft 8 1/2 in)

Line 2

Chinese name
- Simplified Chinese: 南宁地铁2号线
- Traditional Chinese: 南寧地鐵2號線
Transcriptions
Standard Mandarin
- Hanyu Pinyin: Nánníng Dìtiě Èr Hào Xiàn

Zhuang name
- Zhuang: Nanzningz Didez 2 Hauhsienq

Line 2 of the Nanning Metro a rapid transit line running from north to south Nanning. It opened on the 28 December 2017. The eastern extension opened on 23 November 2020.

== Opening timeline ==
Segment	Commencement	Length	Station(s)	Name
Xijin — Yudong	28 December 2017	21.2 km (13.17 mi)	18	Phase 1
Yudong — Tanze	23 November 2020	6.3 km (3.91 mi)	5	Eastern extension

== stations ==
Station name			Transfer	Distance km		Location
English	Chinese	Zhuang	Transfer	Distance km		Location
Xijin	西津	Sihcinh		0.00	0.00	Xixiangtang
Anji Coach Station	安吉客运站	Camh Yinhhek Anhgiz	3			Xixiangtang
Sulu	苏卢	Suhluz				Xixiangtang
Nanning No. 33 Middle School	三十三中	Samcibsam Cungh				Xixiangtang
Xiuxiang	秀厢	Siusiengh				Xixiangtang
Mingxiu Lu	明秀路	Roen Mingzsiu	5			Xixiangtang
Nanning Railway Station	火车站	Hojcehcan	1 NNZ			Xingning
Chaoyang Square	朝阳广场	Cauzyangz Gvangjcangz	1			Xingning
Nanning Theater	南宁剧场	Nanzningz Gicangz				Jiangnan
Fujianyuan	福建园	Fuzgenyenz				Jiangnan
Tinghong Lu	亭洪路	Roen Dingzhungz				Jiangnan
Shizhuling	石柱岭	Sicuilingj				Jiangnan
Jiangnan Coach Station	江南客运站	Camh Yinhhek Gyanghnanz				Jiangnan
Dashatian	大沙田	Dasahdenz	4			Liangqing
Jianshe Lu	建设路	Roen Gensez				Liangqing
Shizitang	石子塘	Sizswjdangz				Liangqing
Jinxiang	金象	Ginhsieng				Liangqing
Yudong	玉洞	Yidung				Liangqing
Dongfeng Lu	东风路	Roen Dunghfungh				Liangqing
Yuling Lu	玉岭路	Roen Yilingj				Liangqing
Nafu Lu	那福路	Roen Nazfuz				Liangqing
Pingliang Overpass	平良立交	Bingzliengz Lizgyauh	3			Liangqing
Tanze	坛泽	Danzcwz				Liangqing
