= Santang =

Santang could refer to the following towns in China:

- Santang, Anhui (三堂镇), town in Taihe County

Written as "三塘镇":

- Santang, Guangxi, in Xingning District, Nanning
- Santang, Zhijin County, Guizhou
- Santang, Hengnan (三塘镇), a town of Hengnan County, Hunan.
- Santang, Xiangyin, a town of Xiangyin County, Hunan
- Santang, Yugan County, Jiangxi
