= Line 4 (Nanning Metro) =

Metro line in Nanning China

- 4
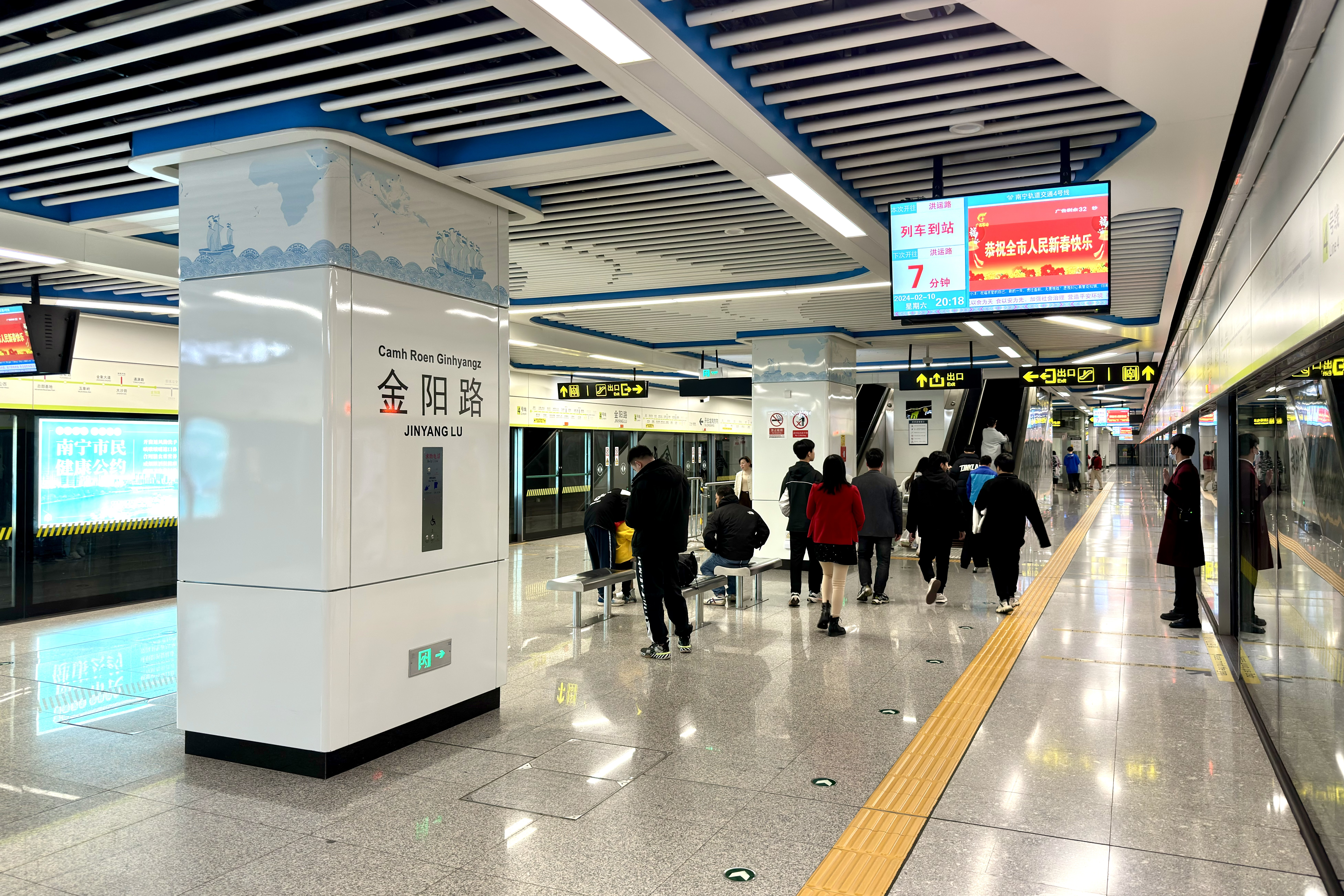
- Jinyang Lu station

Overview
- Status: Operational
- Owner: Nanning
- Locale: Nanning, Guangxi, China
- Termini: Hongyun Lu; Longgang
- Stations: 19 (18 in operation)

Service
- Type: Rapid transit
- System: Nanning Metro
- Services: 1
- Operator: Nanning Rail Transit Corporation
- Depot: Wuxiang Depot
- Rolling stock: 6-car Type B

History
- Opened: November 23, 2020; 5 years ago

Technical
- Line length: 24.6 km (15.29 mi)
- Number of tracks: 2
- Character: Underground
- Track gauge: 1,435 mm (4 ft 8 1/2 in)

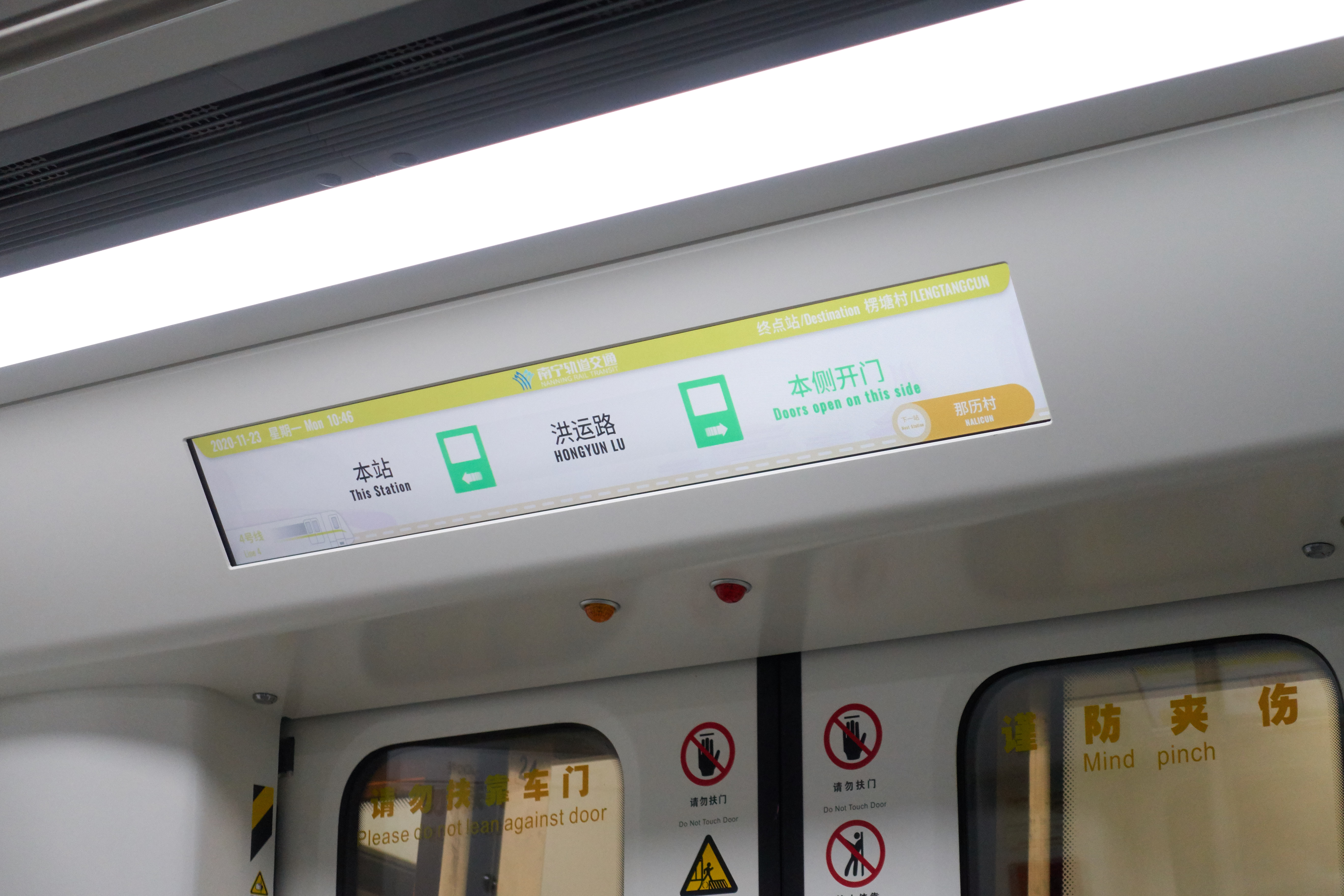
Line 4 train interior LCDs

Line 4 of the Nanning Metro is a rapid transit line in Nanning. Construction started on June 30, 2016, and the line opened on 23 November 2020. The line is 24.6 km long with 18 stations.

== Opening timeline ==
Segment	Commencement	Length	Station(s)	Name
Hongyun Lu — Lengtangcun	23 November 2020	20.7 km (12.86 mi)	16	
Lengtangcun — Longgang	26 September 2025	3.9 km (2.42 mi)	2	Phase 1

== Operating hours ==
Operating hours: 6:30-23:00 from Sunday to Thursday, will be extended to 24:00 on Fridays and Saturdays. At normal time, the train interval is 8 minutes. At peak hours on weekdays (7:30-9:00, 17:30-19:30), the train interval are 5 minutes. On weekends, the peak is flat all day, and the driving interval is 7 minutes.

== Stations ==
Station name			Transfer	Distance km	Location
English	Chinese	Zhuang	Transfer	Distance km	Location
Hongyun Lu	洪运路	Roen Hungzyin			Jiangnan
Nalicun	那历村	Nazlizcunh			Jiangnan
Nahong Overpass	那洪立交	Nazhungz Lizgyauh	5		Jiangnan
Jinyang Lu	金阳路	Roen Ginhyangz			Jiangnan
Tongyuan Lu	通源路	Roen Dunghyenz			Jiangnan
Dashatian	大沙田	Dasahdenz	2		Liangqing
Jinxiang Dadao	金象大道	Daihloh Ginhsieng			Liangqing
Wuxiangling	五象岭	Vujsienglingj			Liangqing
Yuxiang Lu	玉象路	Roen Yisieng			Liangqing
Advanced Business Park	总部基地	Cungjbu Gihdi	3		Liangqing
Feilong Lu	飞龙路	Roen Feihlungz			Liangqing
Guangxi Sports Center West	体育中心西	Baihsae Dijyuz Cunghsinh			Liangqing
Guangxi Sports Center East	体育中心东	Baihdoeng Dijyuz Cunghsinh			Liangqing
Liangqing Bridge South	良庆大桥南	Baihnamz Liengzging Daihgiuz			Liangqing
Liangqingxu	良庆圩	Liengzginghih			Liangqing
Lengtangcun	楞塘村	Lwngzdangzcunh			Liangqing
Wuxiang Railway Station	五象火车	Camh Vusieng Hojcehcan			Liangqing
Qingpingpo	良庆圩	Camh Cinghbongzboh			Liangqing
Longgang	龙岗	Camh Lungzgangh			Liangqing
