= Rotterdam metro crash =

Rail accident in Spijkenisse, Netherlands

De Akkers metro crash
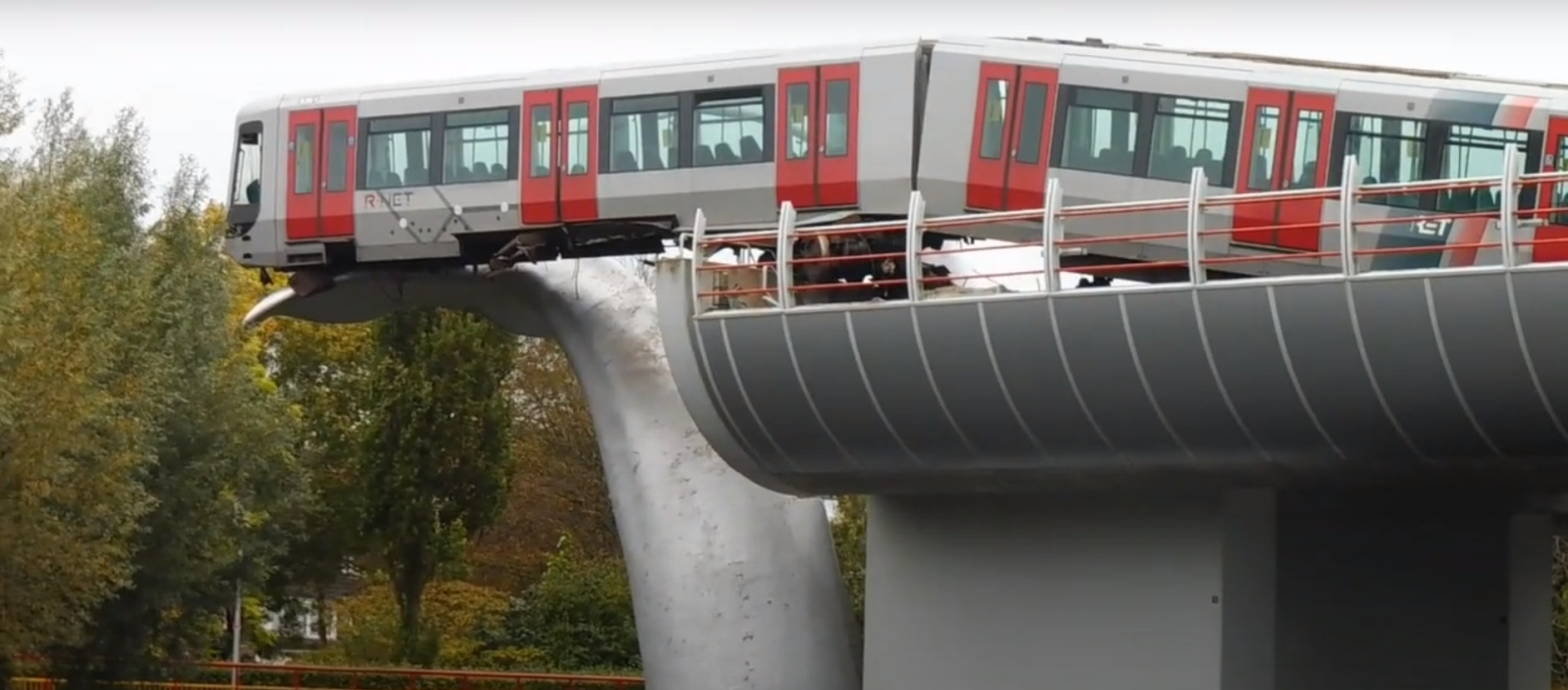
- The derailed metro hanging on the sculpture

- Location of the accident in South Holland

Details
- Date: 2 November 2020
- Location: Near De Akkers, Spijkenisse, Netherlands
- Coordinates: 51.8322°N 4.3120°E
- Country: Netherlands
- Line: Rotterdam Metro C and D
- Operator: Rotterdamse Elektrische Tram (RET)
- Incident type: Overrun
- Cause: Wheel slide on wet rail

On 2 November 2020, an empty train of the Rotterdam Metro overran a buffer stop just after midnight near De Akkers station in Spijkenisse, Netherlands. The metro was driving to the dead-end siding located after the station, but was unable to stop in time before crashing into the buffers. The train came to a stop on top of a whale sculpture at the end of the tracks, which prevented it from falling 10 metres (33 ft) into the ditch below. The driver was the only person present on the train and escaped without injury.

The accident was investigated by the operator, Rotterdamse Elektrische Tram (RET), itself under the supervision of the Human Environment and Transport Inspectorate. The investigation found that the speed limit of 70 kilometres per hour (43 mph) was too high for use as a siding and differed from the other sidings of the network. While the driver was not going too fast, two automatic systems intervened before he started manually braking. Due to drizzle, the track was slippery at the time, causing the wheels to slide before the train impacted the buffers at 45 kilometres per hour (28 mph).

The speed limit at the siding was reduced following the accident, with the crash causing around €1 million in damage. Images of the metro hanging on top of the whale sculpture went viral and garnered international media coverage. Five years after the crash in 2025, the local municipality of Nissewaard proposed to commemorate the accident with an additional artwork on the site.

== Background ==
De Akkers metro station in Spijkenisse is the final stop of lines C and D of the Rotterdam Metro. After the station, there is a dead-end siding used to store metro units throughout the night, also called a staartspoor (transl. tail track) in Dutch. Architect Maarten Struijs, who worked for the municipality of Rotterdam for decades, was tasked with designing the stations of the new Line C of the metro network in the early 2000s. During a public consultation session with the locals at De Akkers, he presented a single whale tail at the end of the tracks on a scale model to symbolize the term and it was included as a joke. When the tail was missing during the second session, the locals noticed and said they were promised a tail. In the end, Struijs decided to design two tails with differing height instead. The two statues, named Walvisstaarten (transl. Whale's Tails), were made from reinforced polyester and erected in 2002. It is the only artwork ever created by Struijs, located 476 metres (1,562 ft) after the platform at De Akkers. Despite being a siding, the track was configured as a main line, allowing a maximum speed of 70 kilometres per hour (43 mph) instead of the 35 kilometres per hour (22 mph) limit used on other sidings of the Rotterdam Metro.

== Accident ==
On 2 November 2020 at 00:17 CET (23:17 UTC), the metro arrived at De Akkers station to end the driver's shift of the day. At the terminus, the train was withdrawn from service to be stored overnight. After all passengers exited the metro, the driver continued towards the siding and accelerated up to 57 kilometres per hour (35 mph). The speed limit gradually decreased to around 20 kilometres per hour (12 mph) as the train approached the buffer stop. However, the driver did not brake soon enough to follow the decreasing limit, causing the train protection system to intervene with an automatic brake application. The automatic brake caused the wheels to slide; the track was slippery as it was drizzling at the time. The wheel slide protection system (WSP) intervened to correct the slide, later followed by a manual application of the brakes by the driver. Despite this, the metro was unable to stop in time and crashed into the buffer with a speed of around 45 kilometres per hour (28 mph). The buffer broke loose due to the impact and ended up underneath the train together with a sand container, detaching the wheel sets and causing the metro to be pushed upwards and over the edge of the viaduct. The first carriage slid across the top of the lower statue of Walvisstaarten and came to rest hanging 10 metres (33 ft) from the viaduct. The driver was unharmed and was able to escape the metro on his own.

== Investigation ==
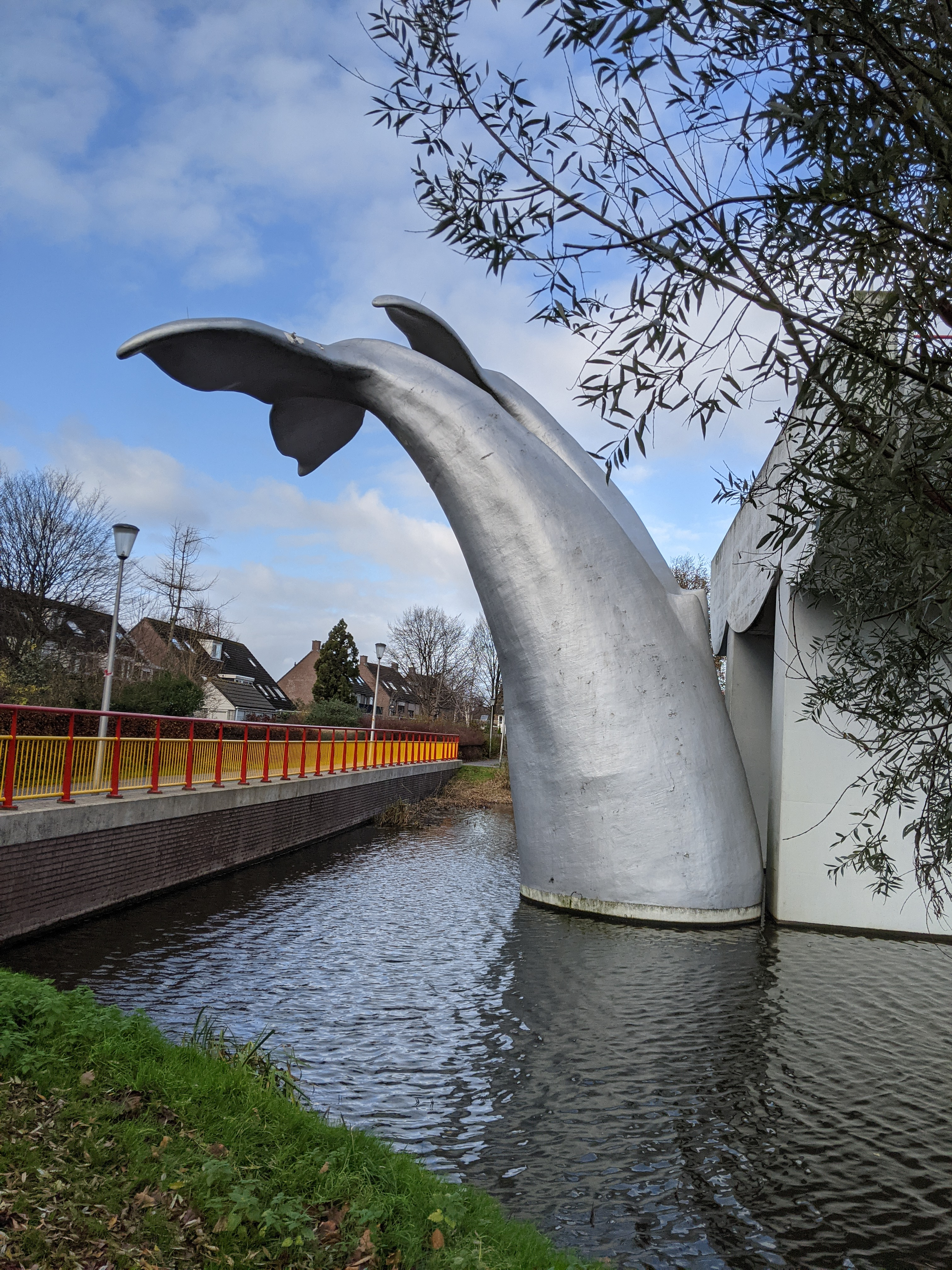
The lower tail received minor damage following the accident

Following the accident, the driver was arrested for questioning and released shortly after. A breathing test and saliva test were also conducted, which, according to police, was standard procedure in such cases. On 12 November, it was announced that the accident would be investigated by the Rotterdamse Elektrische Tram (RET) itself under supervision of the Human Environment and Transport Inspectorate, as the Dutch Safety Board did not see any reason to take action. The train's event recorder, camera footage from the vehicle and platform, and logging from the railway safety system and the traffic control processor were reviewed during the investigation.

In July 2021, the RET concluded its investigation on the crash and released a summary of the report. An important factor was the permitted speed of the area being inappropriate for the use of the track as a siding. While the train was going within the speed limit, the driver did not anticipate the slippery conditions and only applied braking after two automatic systems had already intervened. WSP prevented the train from excessive sliding, but did not provide sufficient deceleration to stop the train in time. The metro unit was not equipped with magnetic track brakes, which could have prevented the collision. Additionally, the buffer stop at the end of the track was only designed to withstand a collision speed of 15 kilometres per hour (9.3 mph). There was a buffer calculated for 50 kilometres per hour (31 mph) at the location prior to 2002, but investigators were unable to determine why it was replaced. Following the conclusion of the RET's investigation, the public prosecutor did not see the driver as a suspect anymore and ceased the ongoing criminal investigation.

Struijs has said that the statues were not meant to be an additional safety measure in case of an overshooting. If the train was traveling on the adjacent track, it would have collided with the higher tail instead of sliding across the top of the lower tail, which could have been fatal. He was surprised that the ageing plastic was strong enough to support the metro, although it was later revealed that only 5 t (11,000 lb) of the 50 t (110,000 lb) vehicle was resting on the statue itself, with the rest of the train still being supported by the viaduct.

== Aftermath ==
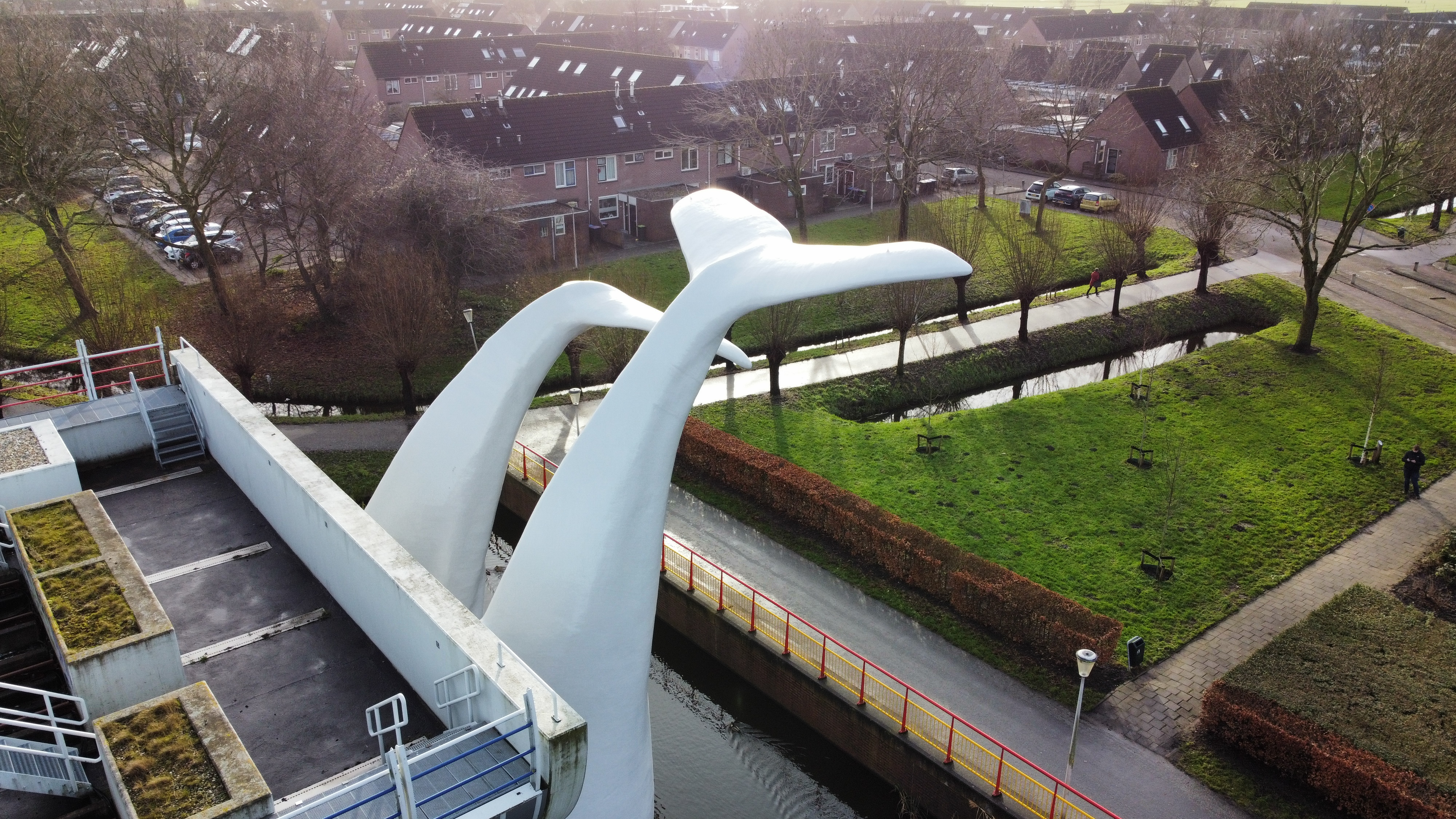
The repaired track and tails 2 years after the accident

Preparations to remove the train from the location started within hours after the accident. The metro was planned to be hoisted up and removed with cranes. Access to the site was limited to a small pathway, with several trees being cut and a ditch being dried up to allow for the cranes to reach the location. Two homes were preemptively evacuated as they were within the reach of the cranes. The hanging front unit was removed in the evening of 3 November and transported to the Waalhaven Depot with a low-loader. The rear unit, which was still on the rails, was hoisted down the following morning. The driver involved in the accident was temporarily suspended and received re-instruction. He returned to work at the RET in January 2021—before the investigation was finalized—as it was already concluded that he was not driving too fast. According to a colleague, however, the accident kept following him around, and that he "felt bullied out" of the company. Speaking of the accusations, the RET only commented that the driver had resigned on his own. The speed limit of the tail track at De Akkers was reduced following the investigation. There were no other tail tracks found with a high speed limit. The cost of the accident was reported to be €1 million.

Footage from the accident went viral around the world, with international publications reporting on the surreal sight of the metro hanging on top of the tail. The site attracted many visitors despite the COVID-19 restrictions in place in the Netherlands. There were calls to include the derailed metro on top of the tail as a new art piece on social media, as well as from some members in the municipal council of Nissewaard. This was rejected by the Metropoolregio Rotterdam–Den Haag (MRDH), the commissioning party for public transport in the area, as it would be too traumatic for the driver. In January 2025, it was announced that the Stratford Underground station was set to get a new art piece called the Saved by the Whale's Tail, Saved by Art as part of the Art on the Underground program, inspired by the whale tails that prevented the De Akkers train from crashing into the canal. Created by Ahmet Öğüt, the artwork was unveiled in September. On the five-year anniversary of the accident, local politicians again wanted to commemorate the accident with an artwork, as the driver had told via his lawyer that he did not have any objections. The MRDH said that it was awaiting a proposal from the municipality.

== See also ==
- O'Hare station train crash: A Chicago Transit Authority train operator fell asleep at the throttle and overshot the buffers at the Chicago O'Hare International Airport station
- Moorgate tube crash: A London Underground train overshot the buffers at Moorgate tube station
