= Liangqing, Nanning =

Liangqing 良庆区 · Liengzcing Gih
- District
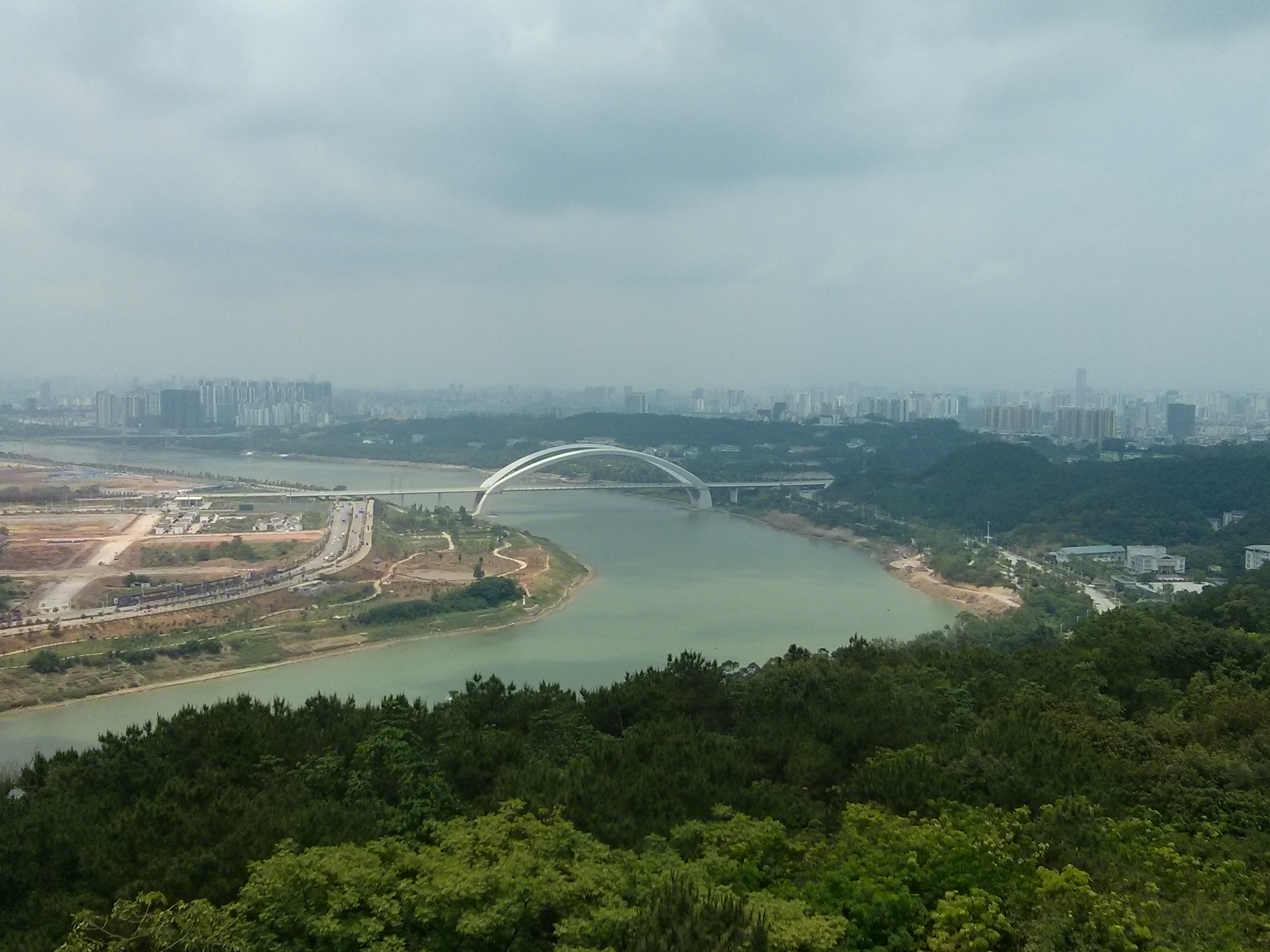

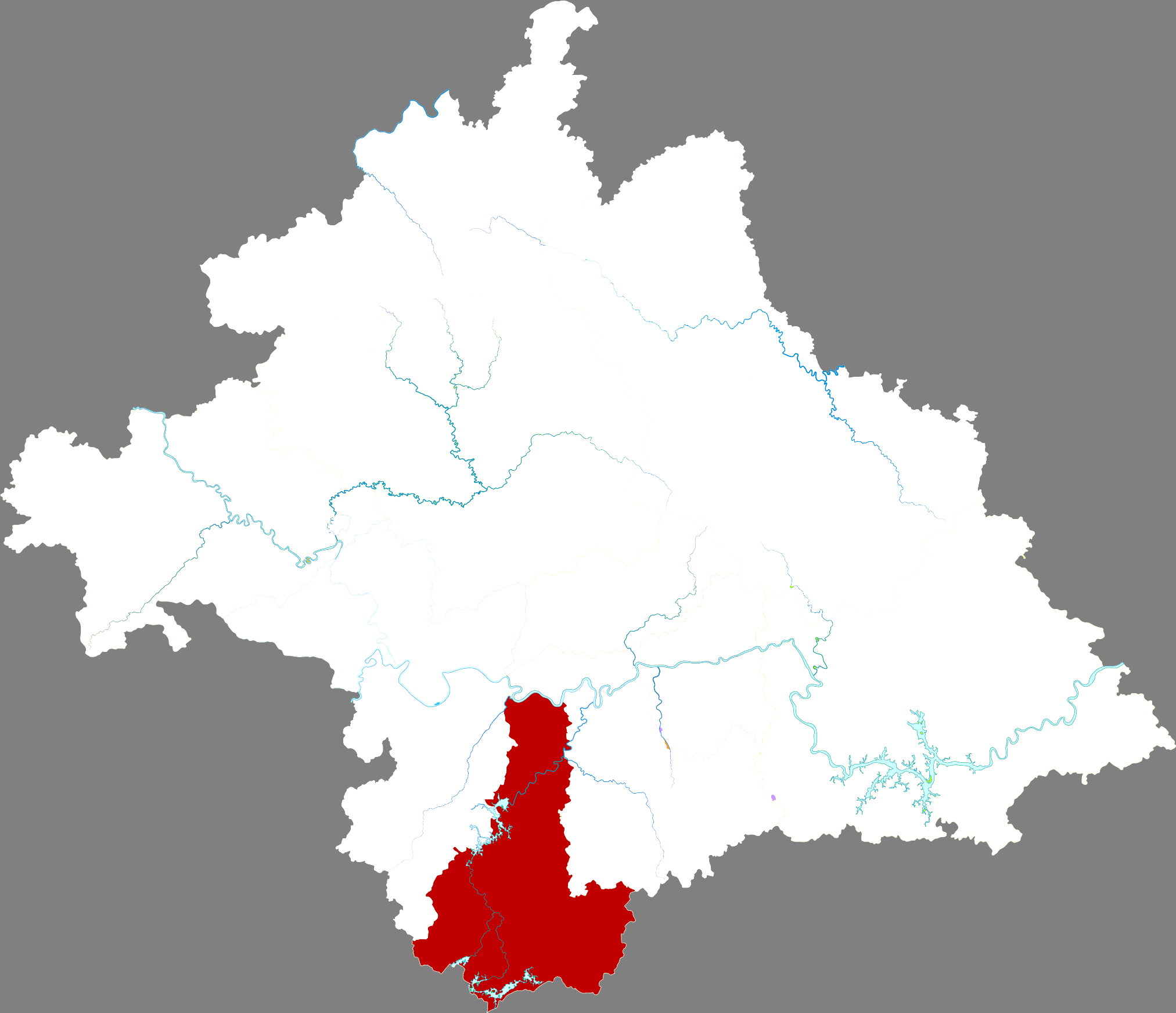
- Location in Nanning

- Location in Guangxi
- Coordinates: 22°44′32″N 108°19′41″E
- Country: China
- Autonomous region: Guangxi
- Prefecture-level city: Nanning

Area
  - Total: 1,369 km^{2} (529 sq mi)

Population (2020)
  - Total: 323,200
  - Density: 236.1/km^{2} (611.5/sq mi)
- Time zone: UTC+8 (China Standard)

Liangqing District (simplified Chinese: 良庆区; traditional Chinese: 良慶區; pinyin: Liángqìng Qū; Standard Zhuang: Liengzcing Gih) is one of 7 districts of the prefecture-level city of Nanning, the capital of Guangxi Zhuang Autonomous Region, South China. The district was approved to establish from parts of the former Yongning County (邕宁县) by the Chinese State Council on September 15, 2004.

== Administrative divisions ==
Liangqing District is divided into 2 subdistricts and 5 towns:

subdistricts

- Dashatian 大沙田街道
- Yudong 玉洞街道

towns

- Liangqing 良庆镇
- Nama 那马镇
- Nachen 那陈镇
- Datang 大塘镇
- Nanxiao 南晓镇
