= Xixiangtang, Nanning =

Xixiangtang 西乡塘区 · Sihsienghdangz Gih
- District
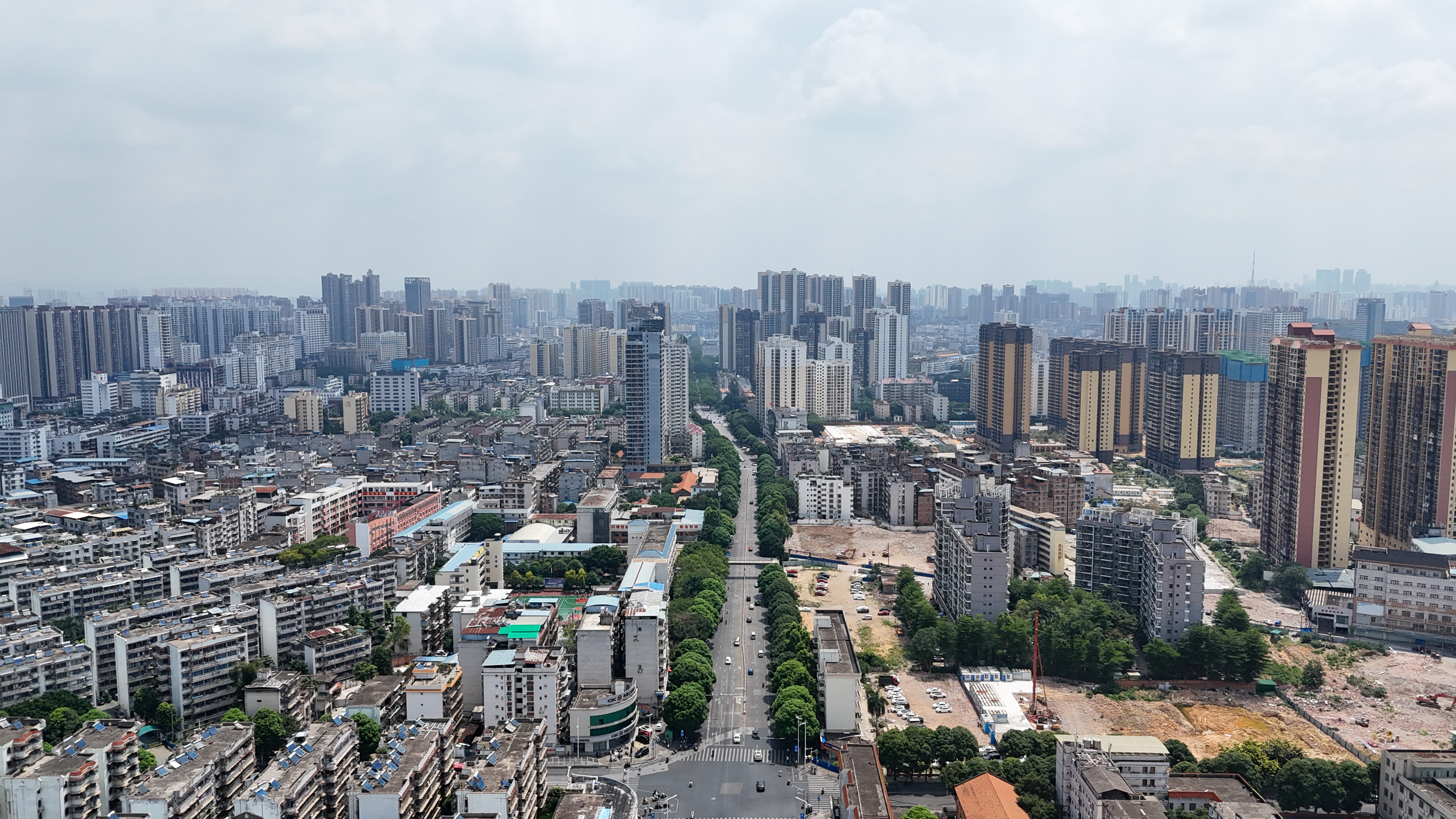

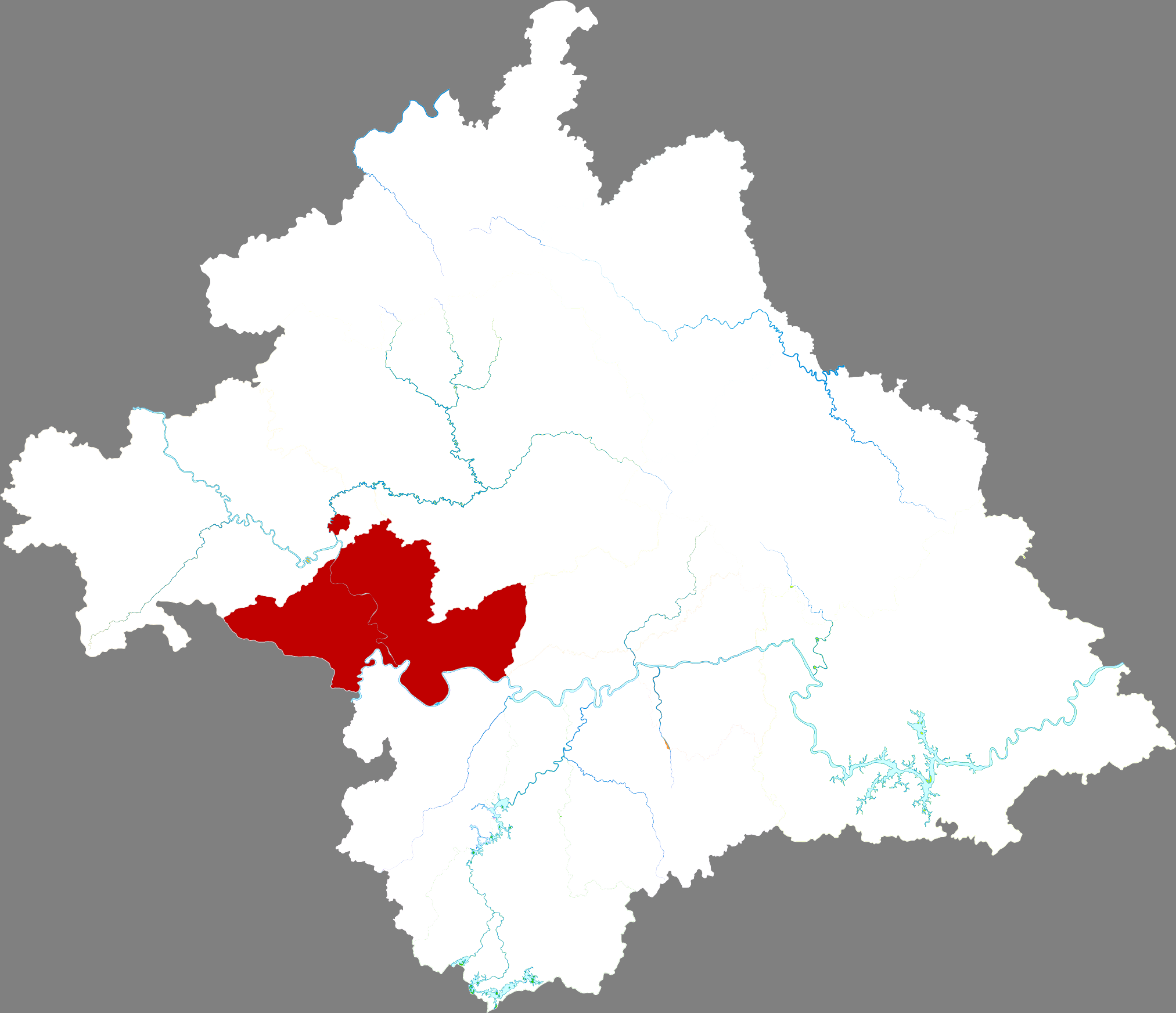
- Location in Nanning

- Location in Guangxi
- Coordinates: 22°50′25″N 108°18′29″E
- Country: China
- Autonomous region: Guangxi
- Prefecture-level city: Nanning

Area
  - Total: 1,154 km^{2} (446 sq mi)

Population (2020)
  - Total: 1,262,600
  - Density: 1,094/km^{2} (2,834/sq mi)
- Time zone: UTC+8 (China Standard)

Xixiangtang District (simplified Chinese: 西乡塘区; traditional Chinese: 西鄉塘區; pinyin: Xīxiāngtáng Qū; Standard Zhuang: Sihsienghdangz Gih) is one of 7 districts of the prefecture-level city of Nanning, the capital of Guangxi Zhuang Autonomous Region, South China. The district was approved to establish by merging the former two districts of Yongxin (永新区, excluding 10 villages of Jaingxi Town) and Chengbei (城北区) by the Chinese State Council on September 15, 2004.

== Administrative divisions ==
Xixiangtang District is divided into 10 subdistricts and 3 towns:

subdistricts

- Hengyang 衡阳街道
- Beihu 北湖街道
- Xixiangtang 西乡塘街道
- Anji 安吉街道
- Huaqiang 华强街道
- Xinyang 新阳街道
- Shangyao 上尧街道
- Anning 安宁街道
- Shibu 石埠街道
- Xinxu 心圩街道

towns

- Jinling 金陵镇
- Shuangding 双定镇
- Tanluo 坛洛镇

== See also ==
- Nanning Railway Station
