= Xingning, Nanning =

Xingning 兴宁区 · Hinghningz Gih
- District
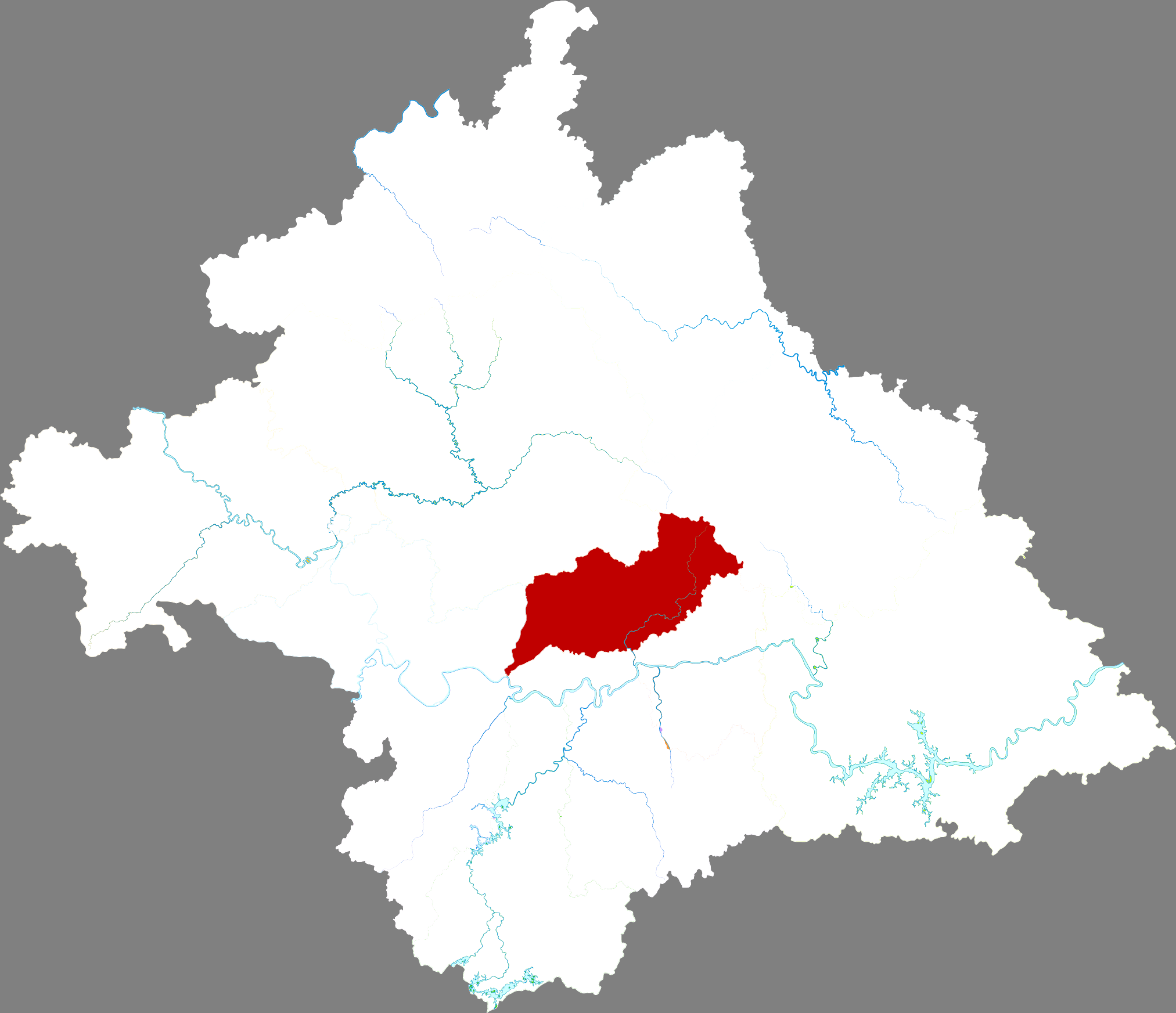
- Location in Nanning

- Location in Guangxi
- Coordinates: 22°48′58″N 108°19′09″E
- Country: China
- Autonomous region: Guangxi
- Prefecture-level city: Nanning
- District seat: Xidong Subdistrict

Area
  - Total: 751 km^{2} (290 sq mi)

Population (2020)
  - Total: 615,485
  - Density: 820/km^{2} (2,120/sq mi)
- Time zone: UTC+8 (China Standard)
- Website: www.nnxn.gov.cn

Xingning District (simplified Chinese: 兴宁区; traditional Chinese: 興寧區; pinyin: Xīngníng Qū; Zhuang: Hinghningz Gih) is one of 7 districts of the prefecture-level city of Nanning, the capital of Guangxi Zhuang Autonomous Region, South China.

== Administrative divisions ==
Xingning District is divided into 3 subdistricts and 3 towns:

- Minsheng Subdistrict (民生街道, Minzswngh Gaihdau)
- Zhaoyang Subdistrict (朝阳街道, Cauzyangz Gaihdau)
- Xindong Subdistrict (兴东街道, Hinghdungh Gaihdau)
- Santang Town (三塘镇, Sanhdangz Cin)
- Wutang Town (五塘镇, Vujdangz Cin)
- Kunlun Town (昆仑镇, Gunhlunz Cin)
