= Line S11 (Chengdu Metro) =

Rapid transit line under construction in Sichuan Province

Chengdu Metro Line S11
- S11

Overview
- Owner: City of Chengdu
- Locale: Chengdu & Deyang, Sichuan Province
- Termini: Weijianian; Deyang Railway Station
- Stations: 16

Service
- Type: Rapid transit
- System: Chengdu Metro
- Operator: Chengdu Metro Corporation

History
- Planned opening: 2028 (Planned)

Technical
- Line length: 71 km (44.1 mi)
- Num of tracks: 2
- Character: underground and elevated
- Electrification: overhead lines, 1,500 V DC
- Operating speed: 160 km/h

Chengdu Metro Line S11, also named as Chengdu - Deyang Line. It has 16 stations (10 underground and 6 elevated), and is 71 km long. Line S11 starts at Weijianian in Jinniu District, Chengdu, ends at Deyang Railway Station in Deyang. This line started construction on 30 March 2023, and anticipates to open in 2027.

== Progress ==
- On 15 Feb 2023, Line S11 was approved by Sichuan Development and Reform Commission.
- On 30 March 2023, Line S11 started construction. The line is expected to open at 2026. It consists of 70.84 km route of 45.30 km elevated section, 23.91 km underground section, and 1.63 km at-grade section.
- On 6 September 2023, Line S11 started construction in Banzhuyuan Station in Xindu.

== Stations ==
Line S11 Station Details
Chinese	English	Opening	Distance (km)	Total Distance (km)	Type		Transfer	Location
Chinese	English	Opening	Distance (km)	Total Distance (km)	Location	Platform style	Transfer	Location
德阳站	Deyang Railway Station	2028	0	0	Underground	Island Platform	西成客运专线 宝成铁路	Jingyang, Deyang
文庙广场	Wenmiao Square	2028	4.5	4.5	Underground	Island Platform		Jingyang, Deyang
五洲广场	Wuzhou Square	2028	2.9	7.4	Underground	Island Platform		Jingyang, Deyang
大学	University	2028	1.3	8.7	Underground	Island Platform		Jingyang, Deyang
德阳南站	Deyang South Railway Station	2028	6.2	14.9	Elevated	Side Platform	西成客运专线	Jingyang, Deyang
金轮	Jinlun	2028	3.9	18.8	Elevated	Side Platform		Guanghan, Deyang
南丰	Nanfeng	Reserved station	(Unknown)	(Unknown)	Elevated	Side Platform		Guanghan, Deyang
三星堆	Sanxingdui	2028	12.3	31.1	Elevated	Side Platform		Guanghan, Deyang
濛阳	Mengyang	2028	11.5	42.6	Elevated	Island Platform		Pengzhou, Chengdu
马家	Majia	2028	11	53.6	Elevated	Side Platform		Xindu, Chengdu
斑竹园	Banzhuyuan	2028	5	58.6	Underground	Island Platform		Xindu, Chengdu
聚虹路	Juhong Road	2028	2.3	60.9	Underground	Island Platform		Jinniu, Chengdu
杜家碾	Dujianian	2028	2.9	63.8	Underground	Island Platform	5	Jinniu, Chengdu
大天路	Datian Road	2028	1.3	65.1	Underground	Island Platform		Xindu, Chengdu
凤凰山	Fenghuangshan	2028	3.1	68.2	Underground	Doubled Island Platform		Jinniu, Chengdu
韦家碾	Weijianian	2028	1.7	69.9	Underground	Island Platform	1 27	Jinniu, Chengdu
