= Jingdong Subdistrict =

Jingdong Subdistrict 旌东街道
- Subdistrict
- Location in Sichuan
- Coordinates: 31°6′41″N 104°24′23″E
- Country: China
- Province: Sichuan
- Prefecture-level city: Deyang
- District: Jingyang District
- Time zone: UTC+8 (China Standard Time)

Jingdong Subdistrict (Chinese: 旌东街道; pinyin: Jīngdōng Jiēdào) is a subdistrict under the jurisdiction of Jingyang District, Deyang City, Sichuan Province, People's Republic of China. As of 2020, it administers the following eight residential communities:

- Yihe Community (沂河社区)
- Dongshan Community (东山社区)
- Chunjin Community (春锦社区)
- Tianshan Community (天山社区)
- Longjing Community (龙井社区)
- Jinghu Community (旌湖社区)
- Le'an Community (乐安社区)
- Tuojiang Community (沱江社区)

== See also ==
- List of township-level divisions of Sichuan
