= Cold sizing =

Cold sizing is a squeezing operation performed at temperatures significantly below the melting point to finish the surface of a workpiece to ensure better dimensional accuracy and surface finish.

The sizing operation is a squeezing operation that minimizes the thickness of the metal. Sizing is performed in an open die and only the surface where the die and workpiece touch will be sized. Many ferrous metal castings are sized to sharpen corners and flatten holes around piercings. Sizing pressure is determined by area to be sized, the metal used, and the change in metal thickness from the operation. Sizing is usually performed on semi-finished parts or parts that require an accurate finish. Stop blocks are used to ensure close tolerances.

Cold sizing, like all other cold forming processes, has a hot process counterpart. In addition to semi-finished parts, cold forming may be used on metal stock, sheet, bar, and rod stock. Cold sizing can be performed on various metals, both ferrous and non-ferrous, and even materials like polymers and plastics. Sizing is related to other squeezing operations like swaging, coining, hobbing, staking and riveting, thread rolling, and extruding.

Although the whole workpiece may be inserted into the die, the sizing operation can give dimensional accuracy to a portion of the part based on the contact with the die. Sizing is mostly used to give a forged or cast part better dimensional accuracy. Mated surfaces between touching parts like gears are often sized. The sizing operation also provides a better surface hardness and finish to the workpiece. Also, the sized surface of the workpiece gets denser and stronger when the operation is performed. The dimensional tolerance of the operation is about 0.025 millimetres (0.00098 in). Primary pressing or a compacting die are typically used when sizing small batches of compact. To keep costs down, larger batches of compact usually have a specialized die made specifically for the operation.

== Troubleshooting ==
This process is designed to achieve the desired dimensional tolerances of the forged parts. Elastic die deflection has been a problem in this operation so two solutions were developed. One solution is to make corrections in the die based on the elastic die deflection. It can be determined how much the workpiece distorted from the desired shape using a finite element analysis (FEA). This analysis is the basis the corrections are made on. The other solution is to apply a counter pressure by inserting an elastomer ring into the lower die in order to compensate the elastic die deflection.
