= Xinjin railway station =

Railway station in Chengdu, China

Xinjin 新津站
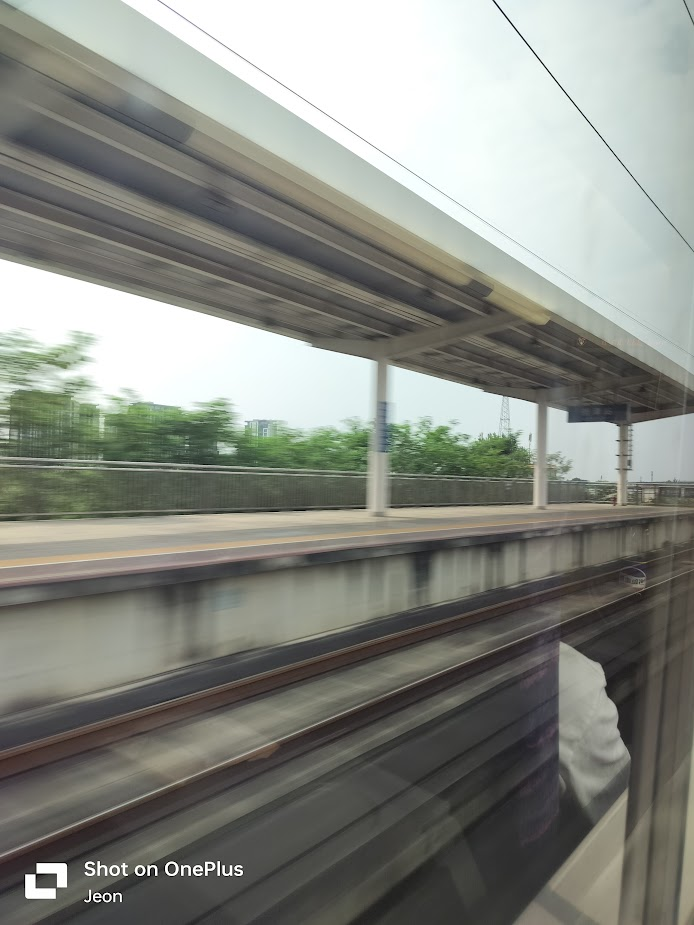

General information
- Location: Xinjin District, Chengdu, Sichuan; China
- Coordinates: 30.468019°N 103.868228°E
- Operator: Chengdu Railway Bureau, China Railway Corporation
- Lines: Chengdu–Guiyang high-speed railway Chengdu–Mianyang–Leshan intercity railway

Other information
- Station code: Telegraph code: IRW; Pinyin code: XJI

History
- Opened: 20 December 2014
Location
- Location within Sichuan Location within China

Xinjin railway station (Chinese: 新津站) is a railway station located in Xinjin District, Chengdu, Sichuan Province, China. It is a station on the Chengdu–Mianyang–Leshan intercity railway. The station opened on 20 December 2014 for Chengdu-Leshan train services.

== Chengdu Metro ==
Xinjin Railway Station 新津站
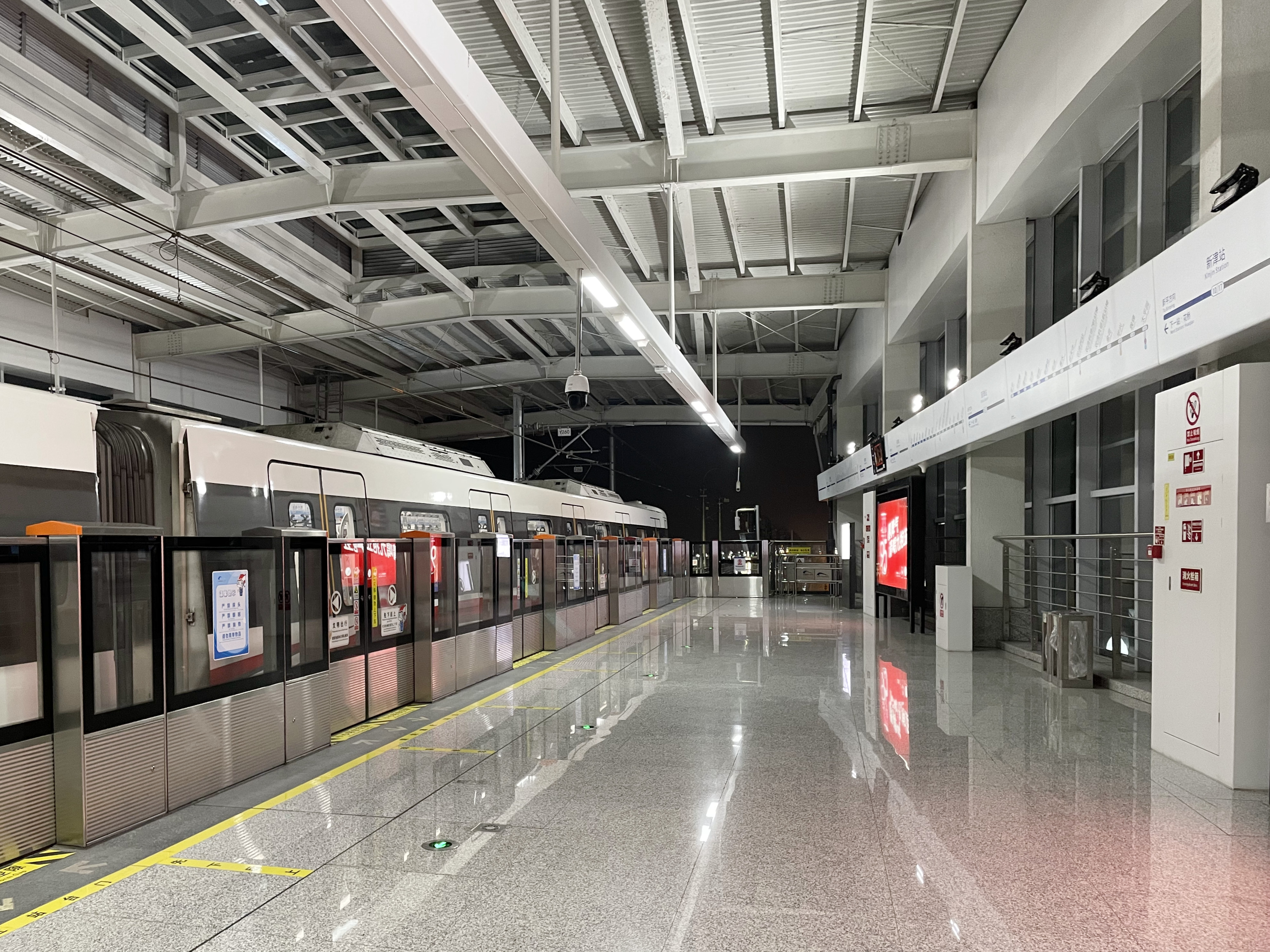

General information
- Location: Xinjin District, Chengdu, Sichuan; China
- Operator: Chengdu Metro Limited
- Line: Line 10
- Platforms: 2 (2 side platforms)

Other information
- Station code: 1017

History
- Opened: 27 December 2019
- Former names: Xinjin Station

Services
Preceding station	Chengdu Metro	Following station
Huayuan towards Wuhou Shrine	Line 10	Huaqiao towards Xinping
Location

It is served by Line 10 of the Chengdu Metro. The station was previously named Xinjin Station.
