= Jingyang =

Jingyang may refer to several places in China:

- Jingyang County (泾阳县), of Xianyang, Shaanxi
- Jingyang District (旌阳区), Deyang, Sichuan
- Jingyang, Jingde County (旌阳镇), town in Jingde County, Anhui
- Jingyang, Fuqing (镜洋镇), town in Fuqing, Fujian
