= Deyang railway station =

Railway station

Deyang railway station 德阳站
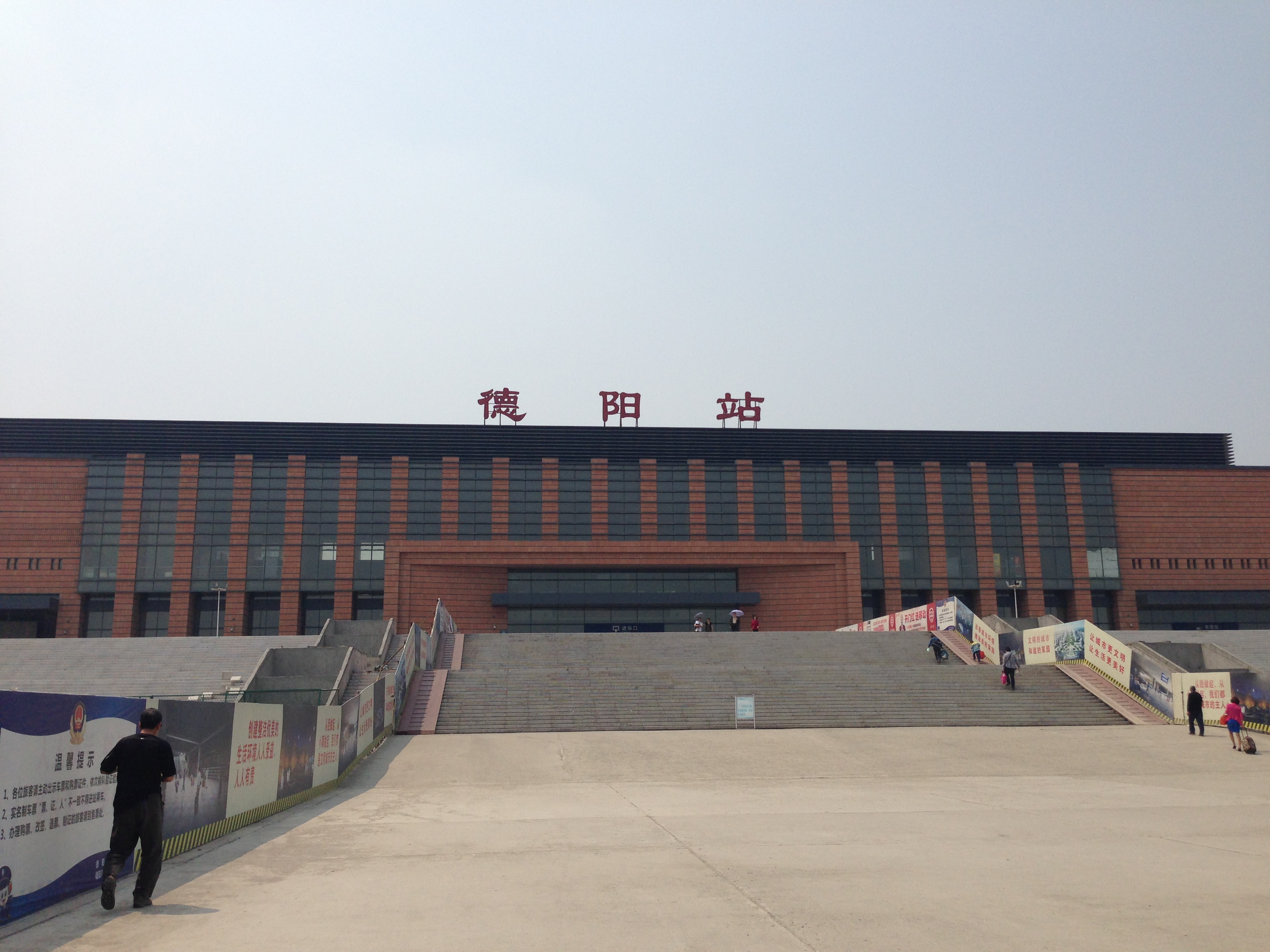

General information
- Location: China
- Coordinates: 31.1683°N 104.3871°E
Location

Deyang railway station (Chinese: 德阳站) is a second-class railway station in Deyang. It was built in 1952. It is on the Xi'an–Chengdu high-speed railway and Baoji–Chengdu railway.

== History ==
Work to rebuild the station began in November 2009. The station reopened on 22 March 2011.

Preceding station	China Railway	Following station
Mianyang towards Baoji	Baoji–Chengdu railway	Chengdu Terminus
Preceding station	China Railway High-speed	Following station
Luojiang East towards Xi'an North	Xi'an–Chengdu high-speed railway	Guanghan North towards Chengdu East
