= Forging temperature =

Temperature at which a metal softens

Forging temperature is the temperature at which a metal becomes substantially more soft, but is lower than the melting temperature, such that it can be reshaped by forging. Bringing a metal to its forging temperature allows the metal's shape to be changed by applying a relatively small force, without creating cracks. For most metals, forging temperature is approximately 70% of the absolute temperature (usually measured in kelvins) of its melting point.

Selecting the maximum forging temperature allows metals to be forged more easily, lowering the forging pressure and thus the wear on metal-forming dies. The temperature at which a metal is forged can affect the homogeneity in microstructure and mechanical properties of forged products, which can highly affect the performance of products used in manufacturing.

Material	Forging Temperature		Melting point (Note: The temperatures of alloys vary depending on the ration of metals mixture)
Material	Celsius	Fahrenheit	°C
Carbon steel - 0.50% carbon content	1230	2246	~1425-1540
Stainless steel (nonmagnetic)	1150	2102	~1400-1530
Stainless steel (magnetic)	1095	2003	~1400-1530
Nickel	1095	2003	1453
Titanium	955	1751	1660
Copper	900	1652	1083
Brass (25 alloy types with varying ratios of copper and zinc)	815	1499	~900-940
Commercial bronze (90% copper and 10% tin)	900 to 419.53	1652 to 787.154	~950
Aluminium	300 - 480	600 - 900	660
Zinc	419.53	787.154	420
Lead	25	77	327
Iron	1371	2500	1535
Tin	231.93	449.474	232

== See also ==
- Plasticity
- Tammann temperature and Hüttig temperature – Chemical properties of materials
