= Guanghan North railway station =

Railway station in Guanghan, China

Coordinates: 31.0116°N 104.2734°E

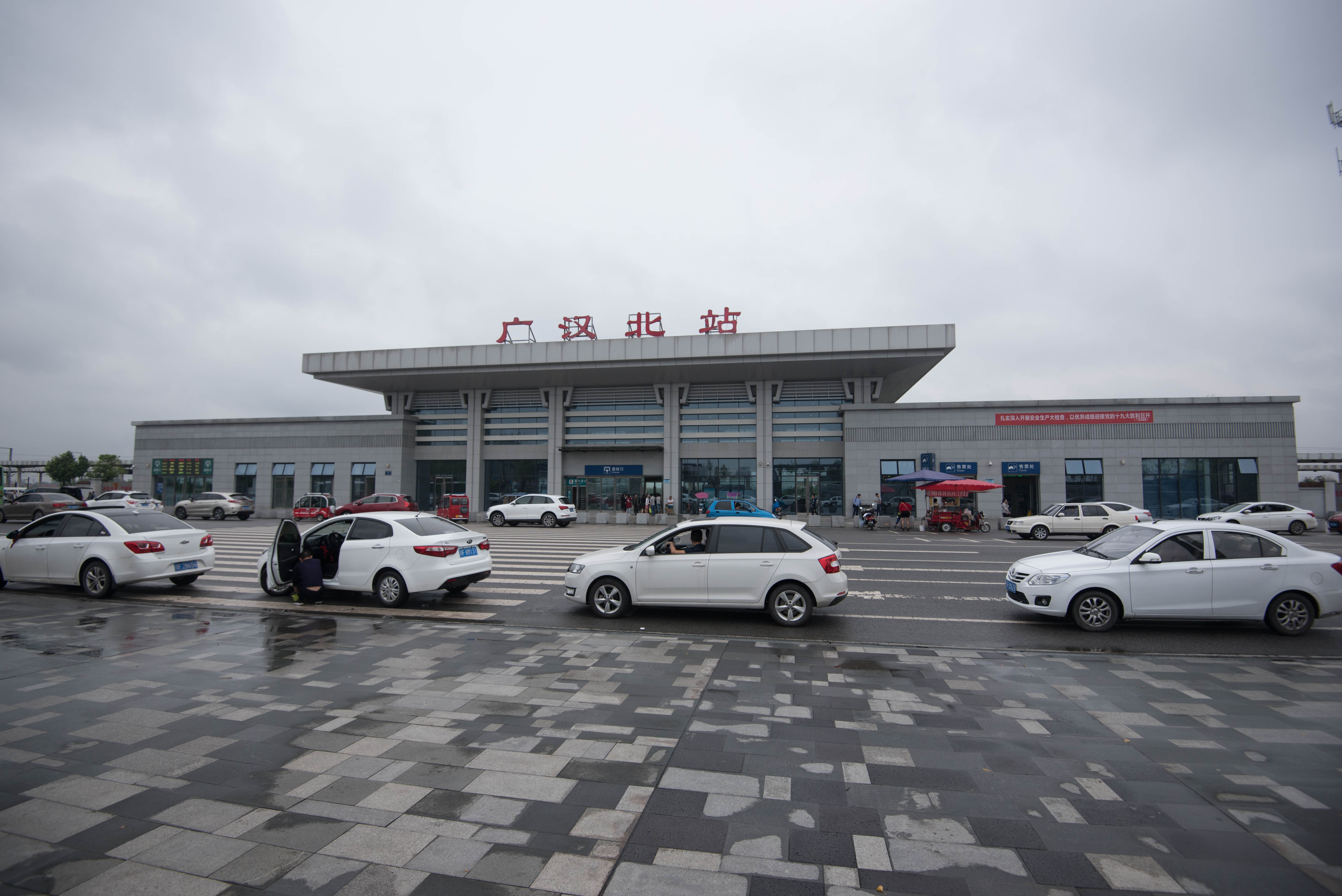

Guanghan North railway station (Chinese: 广汉北站) is a railway station in Guanghan on the Chengdu–Mianyang–Leshan intercity railway and Xi'an–Chengdu high-speed railway.
