= Swaging =

Metalworking process

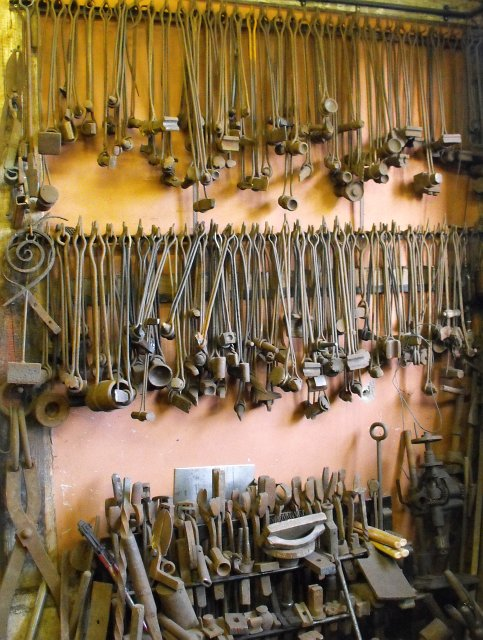
A selection of blacksmithing swages

Swaging (/ˈsweɪdʒɪŋ/) is a forging process in which the dimensions of an item are altered using dies into which the item is forced. Swaging is usually a cold working, but sometimes a hot working, process.

The term swage may apply to the process (verb) or to a die or tool (noun) used in that process.

== Origin ==
The term swage comes from the Old French term souage, meaning "decorative groove" or "ornamental moulding". Swages were originally tools used by blacksmiths to form metal into various shapes too intricate to make with a hammer alone. These have handles for holding or pegs for attaching to an anvil, and often a flat head for striking with a hammer. Swage blocks are anvil-like dies with various shapes forged into them, which are also used for forming metal. Swages called fullers are specific to making grooves in swords and knives.

Swage is most often pronounced /ˈsweɪdʒ/ (AHD format: swāj). Another (less common) pronunciation sometimes heard in the metalworking industries is /ˈswɛdʒ/ (AHD format: swĕj) (perhaps influenced by sledge as in sledgehammer).

== Process ==
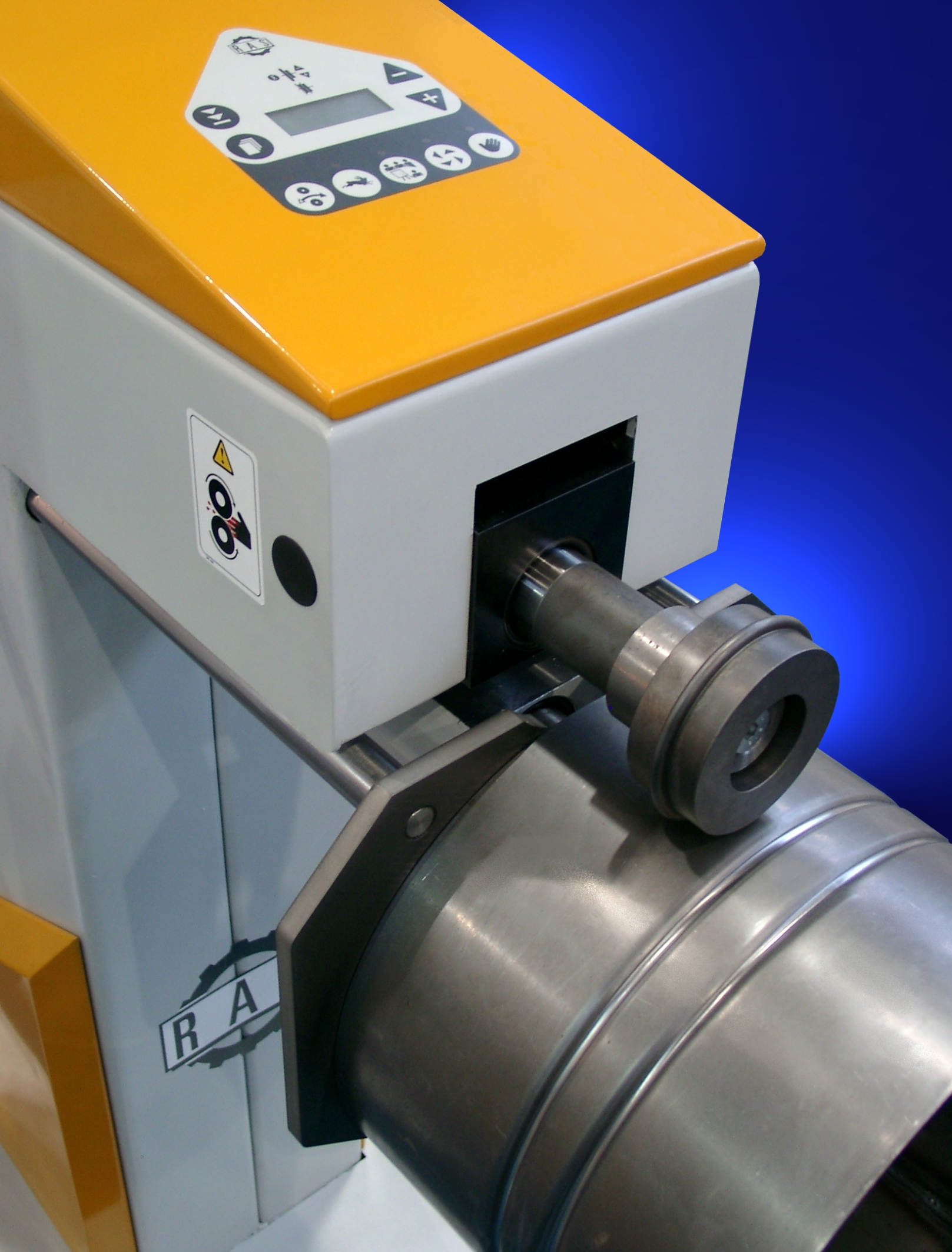
Rotary swaging machine

As a general manufacturing process swaging may be broken up into two categories:

- The first category of swaging involves extrusion of the workpiece, forcing it through a confining die to reduce its diameter, similar to the process of drawing wire. This may also be referred to as "tube swaging".
- The second category involves two or more dies used to hammer a round workpiece into a smaller diameter. This process is usually called "rotary swaging" or "radial forging".

Tubes may be tagged (reduced in diameter to enable the tube to be initially fed through the die to then be pulled from the other side) using a rotary swager, which allows them to be drawn on a draw bench. Swaging is normally the method of choice for precious metals since there is no loss of material in the process.

Rotary swaging is usually a cold working process, used to reduce the diameter, produce a taper, or add a point to a round workpiece. It can also impart internal shapes in hollow workpieces through the use of a mandrel (the shape must have a constant cross-section). Swaging a bearing into a housing means either flaring its groove's lips onto the chamfer of the housing, or flaring the housing's material over the edge of the bearing. The flaring is done with a pair of rolls that travel around the hole and are fed down into the part, deforming the metal in a controlled, predicted way. Grease is often used to lubricate this swaging process, which is also called roller swaging.

A swaging machine works by using two or four split dies which separate and close. This action is achieved by mounting the dies into the machine's spindle which is rotated by a motor. The spindle is mounted inside a cage containing rollers (looks like a roller bearing). The rollers are larger than the cage so as the spindle spins the dies are pushed out to ride on the cage by centrifugal force, as the dies cross over the rollers they push the dies together because of their larger size. On a four-die machine, the number of rollers cause all dies to close at a time; if the number of rollers do not cause all pairs of dies to close at the same time then the machine is called a rotary forging machine, even though it is still a swaging process.

A variation of the rotary swager is the creeping spindle swaging machine where both the spindle and cage revolve in opposite directions, this prevents the production of fins between the dies where the material being swaged grows up the gap between the dies.

There are two basic types of rotary swaging machine, the standard (also known as a tagging machine), and the butt swaging machine. A butt swaging machine works by having sets of wedges that close the dies onto the workpiece by inserting them between the annular rollers and the dies, normally by the use of a foot pedal. A butt swaging machine can allow a workpiece to be inserted without the dies closing on it, for example a three-foot (90 cm) workpiece can be inserted 12 inches (30 cm) and then the dies closed, drawn through until 12 inches (30 cm) remain and the dies are then released, the finished workpiece would then, for example, be four feet (120 cm) but still of its initial diameter for one foot (30 cm) at each end.

== Uses ==
=== Blacksmithing ===
Swages are used for shaping the metal in various ways, to enhance its beauty or its fit for a desired purpose.

=== Electronics ===
In printed circuit board assembly individual connector pins are sometimes pressed/swaged into place using an arbor press. Some pins have a hollow end that is pressed over by the arbor's tool to form a mushroom-shaped retaining head. Typical pin diameter range from 0.017 to 0.093 inches (0.43 mm to 2.36 mm) or larger. The swaging is an alternative or supplement to soldering.

=== Plastics ===
Heat swaging is a similar process to heat staking, but it involves rolling or reforming a wall (typically a perimeter) of a plastic part to retain another part or component.

=== Pipes and cables ===
The most common use of swaging is to attach fittings to pipes or cables (also called wire ropes); the parts loosely fit together, and a mechanical or hydraulic tool compresses and deforms the fitting, creating a permanent joint. In a Swagelok tube connector, tightening the connector's nut with a wrench swages part of the connector permanently to the tubing. Once swaged on, the connection can be unmated and remated.

Pipe flaring machines are another example. Flared pieces of pipe are sometimes known as "swage nipples", "pipe swages", or "reducing nipples". In furniture, legs made from metal tubing (particularly in commercial furniture) are often swaged to improve strength where they come in contact with the ground, or casters.

=== Saw blade teeth ===
In sawmills, a swage is used to flare large bandsaw or circle saw teeth, which increases the width of the cut, called the kerf. A clamp attaches a mandrel and die to the tooth and the eccentric die is rotated, swaging the tip. A much earlier version of the same operation used a hardened, shaped swage die and a hand held hammer. Saw teeth formed in this way are sometimes referred to as being "set". A finishing operation, shaping, cold works the points on the tooth sides to flats. It might be considered as a side swage. This slightly reduces the tooth width but increases the operating time between "fittings". Swaging is a major advance over filing as the operation is faster, more precise and greatly extends the working life of a saw.

=== Manufacturing ===
When dealing with rubber components with mold bonded metal sleeves, swaging provides a more controlled and cost-effective alternative to 'shooting' the rubber part into a metal sleeve, where an intensive and less dependable secondary operation is needed to finish the product. A metal can with a bonding component (such as phosphate) is painted to the inside diameter, and molten rubber is injected into the metal sleeve. This creates a product that when cooled may be swaged to the desired size. The second reason for this is that the product is more reliable, and during the swaging process the rubber is more relaxed when the outside can to which the rubber is bonded has its diameter reduced, changing the springrate (K) values and damping coefficient (C) of the rubber. After swaging, any inconsistencies in the metal and rubber have been minimized.

=== Firearms ===
In internal ballistics, swaging describes the process of the bullet entering the barrel and being squeezed to conform to the rifling. Most firearm bullets are made slightly larger than the inside diameter of the rifling, so that they are swaged to engage the rifling and form a tight seal upon firing.

In ammunition manufacture, swaged bullets are bullets manufactured by compressing metal at room temperature into a die to form it into the shape of a bullet. The other common manufacturing method is casting, which uses molten metals poured into a mold. Since metals expand when heated and contract when cooled, cast bullets must be cast with a mold slightly larger than the desired finish size, so that as the molten metal cools, it will harden at just the right point to shrink to the desired size. In contrast, swaged bullets, since they are formed at the temperature at which they will be used, can be formed in molds of the exact desired size. This means that swaged bullets are generally more precise than cast bullets. The swaging process also leads to fewer imperfections, since voids commonly found in casting would be pressed out in the swaging process. The swaging process in reference to cold flow of metals into bullets is the process not of squeezing the metals into smaller forms but rather pressing smaller thinner items to form into shorter and slightly wider shapes.

Individuals who make their own bullets usually are not aware of available manual specialized equipment and dies required for swaging bullets, and thus choose to make cast bullets. To get high precision results, it is common to cast the bullets slightly oversized, then swage the resulting castings through a die to do the final forming. Since the amount of pressure required to size the bullet is far less than that required to form a bullet, a simple mechanical press can be used, often the same press used for handloading ammunition.

All of the larger manufacturers of reloading equipment have abandoned making or marketing bullet swaging equipment due to the downturn in the popularity of the manual methods and the subsequent loss of sales. Currently there are only a few die makers who manufacture and market bullet swaging equipment. Four die and equipment makers, CH/4D, RCE, Corbin, and Custom Maker Kaine Dies, manufacture the bulk of bullet swaging equipment in the United States.

=== Medicine ===
In surgery, the thread used in sutures is often swaged to an eyeless needle in order to prevent damage as the needle and suture thread are drawn through the wound.

=== Musical instrument repair ===
In musical instrument repair the usual term on both sides of the Atlantic is swedging, not swaging, though it is generally acknowledged that the former derives from the latter. Keyed instruments such as the clarinet, bassoon, oboe and flute need swedging when years of key movement has worn or compressed the metal of the hinge tube they swivel on and made it slightly shorter, so that the key can travel along the rod it is mounted on instead of being held firmly between the posts attaching the rod to the body of the instrument. This gives rise to floppy keys and a poor air-seal and needs to be corrected by lengthening (swedging) the hinge tube. This is a job that needs to be done by hand, and swedging pliers with highly polished oval holes in the jaws to fit common sizes of hinge tubes are often used to achieve this, though various proprietary designs of swedging tools are available to do the same job more efficiently.

In piano technology, swaging happens in several areas: key leads, underlever leads, and bass strings. Key leads which, in the piano's earliest history, were actually made using lead, are soft, round chunks that are inserted into holes drilled into the side of piano keys as a means of balancing actions. Key leads vary in size, generally small, medium, and large. Basically, key leads help to make a keyboard's touch light enough to play. Over time, fluctuations in humidity and aging of wood in piano key-sticks and underlevers causes space to develop around leads, causing them to rattle, tick, or knock. Loose leads in underlevers tend to be the most annoying to pianists because it's difficult to pinpoint where the noise (often a "tick" sound) is coming from. The remedy for the noise is swaging—squashing the leads with a short steel rod. Swaging the lead fills the void and eliminates the noise.

Bass strings in pianos are generally constructed with round—sometimes hexagonal—drawn-steel cores, over which copper is wound. Especially on round core wire, the last several inches of the area where the winding terminates is often flattened—swaged—to create a grabbing point for the copper winding material.

=== Car styling ===
As swaging is a technique in which cold metal is formed over a grooved tool or swage, the term was adopted in the field of automotive styling to describe when two panels were brought together, an edge of one panel was swaged so to overlap the other to create the impression of one continuous surface.

The term is now often used generically to refer to any similar designs.

=== Lockbolts ===
A lockbolt is a fastener similar to a bolt in appearance and function. However, instead of using screw threads which connect to a nut using a turning motion, a lockbolt has annular grooves around the shaft of the bolt (pin). After placing the lockbolt in a hole, a threadless collar is forced at high pressures around the annular grooves, deforming the collar and permanently locking it into place around the grooves. Swaging is the generic term for setting a lockbolt and collar assembly. During the installation cycle of a lockbolt, the collar is deformed around the pin with locking grooves using special tooling. The tool engages onto the pintail, which is an extra portion of pin material protruding past the collar that the tool grabs and pulls. This force on the pintail pushes the joint together, and the conically-shaped cavity of the tooling is forced down the collar, which reduces its diameter and progressively swages the collar material into the grooves of the harder pin.

As the force required for swaging increases during the process, the installation is finalised when the pintail breaks off. Lockbolts could be viewed as a heavy-duty cousin of structural blind rivets ("pop rivets" in some regions), though the way the collar material's plastic deformation is achieved is different. Some tools are capable of "setting" both variants, as in both cases traction is applied to a sacrificial pintail.

== See also ==
- Crimp (joining) – Joining two materials by deforming one or both to hold the other
- Flare fitting – Type of compression fitting used with metal tubing
- Swaged sleeve – Connector crimped to grip the inserted component
- Swaged socket – Terminal with tubular part plasticly deformed to grip the wire

== Bibliography ==
- Degarmo, E. Paul; Black, J T.; Kohser, Ronald A. (2003). Materials and Processes in Manufacturing (9th ed.). Wiley. ISBN 978-0-471-65653-1..
- Sullivan, Gary & Crawford, Lance, "The Heat Stake Advantage". Plastic Decorating Magazine. January/February 2003 Edition. ISSN 1536-9870. (Topeka, KS: Peterson Publications, Inc.). Section: Assembly: pages 11–12, covers Sullivan & Crawford's article.
