= China National Erzhong Group =

Chinese state-owned machinery company

- Native name: 中国第二重型机械集团公司
- Company type: State-owned
- Industry: Heavy machinery
- Headquarters: Deyang, Sichuan, China
- Area served: Worldwide
- Products: Forgings, etc.
- Number of employees: 12,650 (2008)
- Website: www.china-erzhong.com

China National Erzhong Group is a Chinese state-owned heavy machinery company, which makes smelting and forging equipment, with its headquarters in Deyang, Sichuan. In 2015, it defaulted on interest payments after a local court accepted a restructuring request from one of its creditors.

As of 2008, it had 12,650 employees.

== Overview ==
Erzhong is a manufacturer of numerous aggregates for Chinese infrastructure, including critical one. It includes nuclear power plants projects, crankshafts for cargo ships, hydroelectric power turbines blades. Yet one of its unique achievements is a 22,000-ton steel hydraulic press forge that is used for production of bulkheads, landing gear, engine parts for China's Air Force and commercial passenger planes. It was suggested it can be used for aircraft carriers production, armor plating, spacecraft, and high-pressure mining tools.
