= Hammerscale =

Byproduct of iron forging

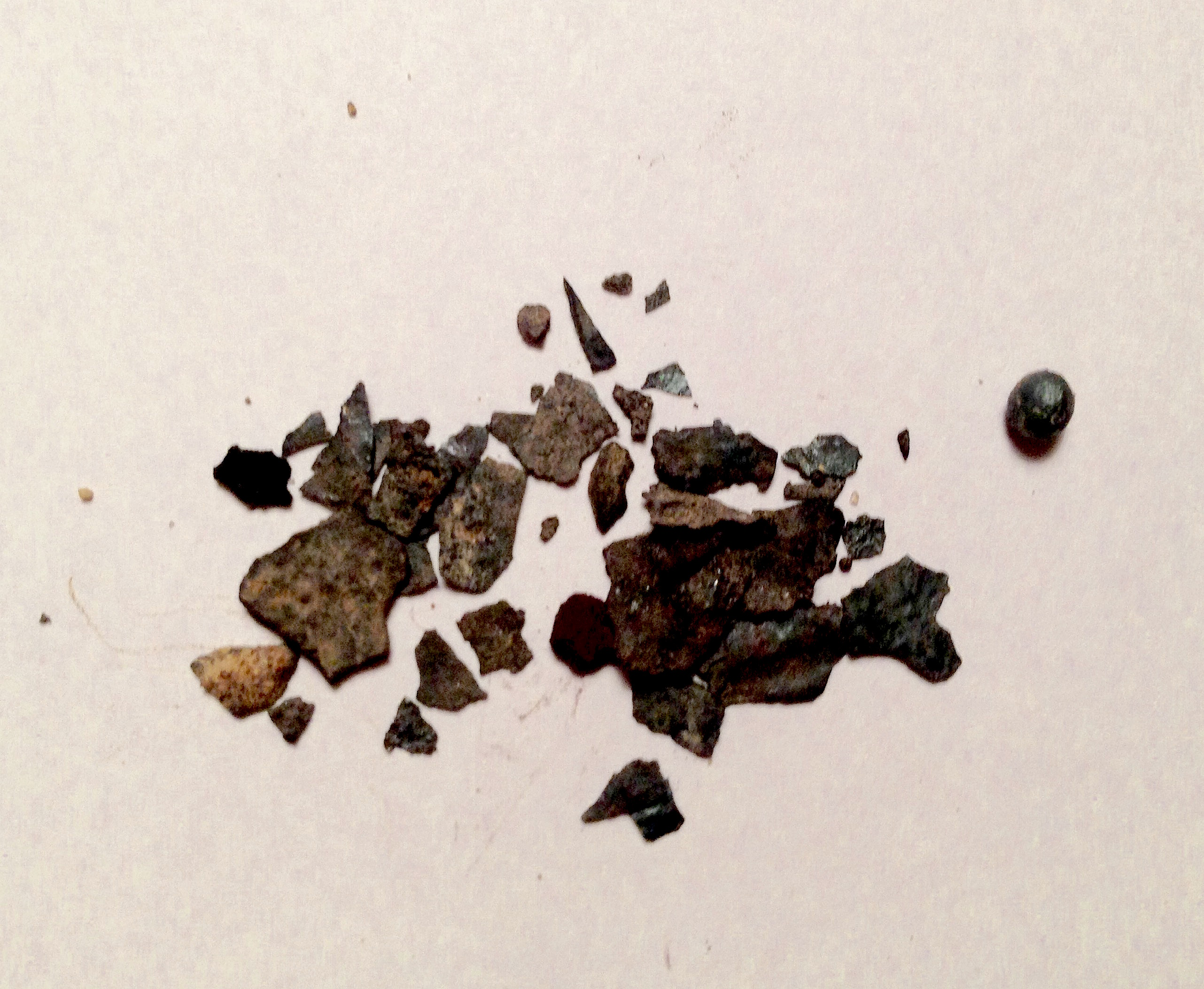
Flake hammerscale with a spheroid

Hammerscale, also written hammer scale, is a flaky or spheroidal byproduct of the iron forging process (for modern equivalent, see mill scale). Hammerscale is almost universally recovered from archaeological excavations in areas where iron ore was refined and forged. Hammerscale’s magnetic character also aids in its recovery and in mapping larger features by means of magnetic susceptibility surveys. Hammerscale can provide vital information about an archeological site such as the function of the feature.

== Description ==
=== Physical attributes ===
Hammerscale appears in two forms: flakes and hollow spheroids. The flakes can vary greatly in appearance and size; however, their color ranges from a dark black to a lustrous blue or grey and their thickness from one to five millimeters. Like the flakes, the spheroids are also quite small but their size can vary. Their color tends to range from grey to a dark black or blue.

=== Chemical composition ===
The chemical composition of hammerscale is disputed and varies greatly. Most sources agree that hammerscale is composed of some form of iron oxide. Magnetite is a generally accepted form, giving hammerscale its notable magnetic character. However, hammerscale’s chemical composition can change depending on from which stage in the iron purification process it derives; for flakes and spheroids from early stages, the composition will be largely mixed whereas flakes from late stages will be purer iron oxide forms. Ultimately, some still argue that the chemical components of hammerscale besides iron vary widely beyond ionized oxygen to form a metal oxide.

== Production ==
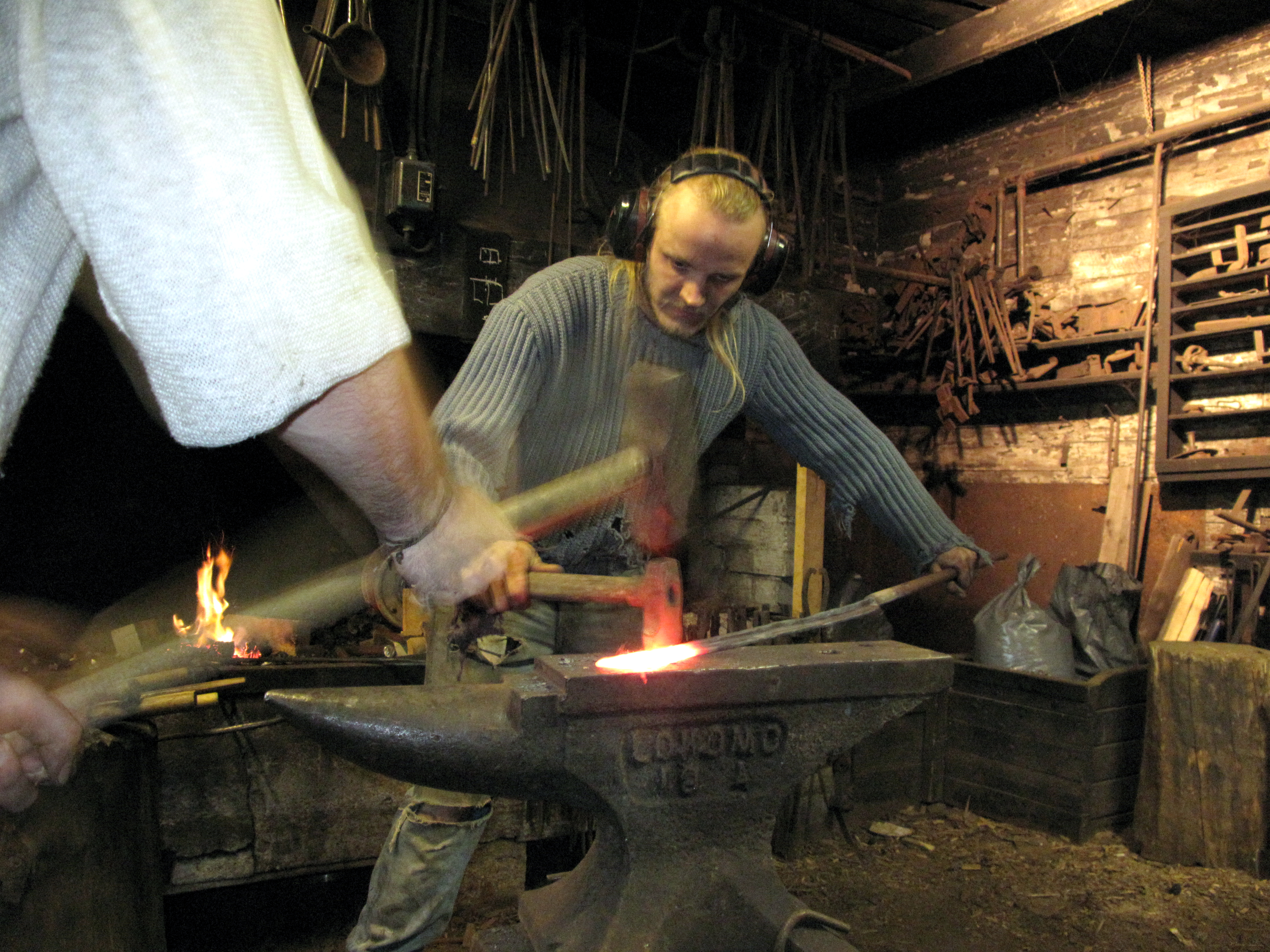
A modern blacksmith in Finland practicing ironworking in a manner similar to more archaic methods that resulted in the production of hammerscale

Flake hammerscale forms due to the rapid oxidation of hot iron in air. A heated piece of iron will develop an external layer of iron oxide which then may separate from the original piece due to a hammer strike or differential thermal contraction.

Flake hammerscale is produced in large quantities during multiple stages of the smithing process. To create the pure iron necessary for forging, a smith must first purify the iron ore. The smelting of ore creates a "bloom", a porous mixture of slag and metal. The smith then repeatedly heats and hammers the bloom to remove impurities. This technique creates hammerscale of varying composition. As the purification process continues, the hammerscale’s iron content increases.

Additional hammerscale is produced during the forging of the pure iron from the heating and hammering necessary to shape the piece. The scale produced at this stage is characterized by its blue-black color and tends to be slimmer and darker due to its high iron oxide content.

Archeologists believe that spheroidal hammerscale is produced primarily during the process known as fire welding. Also known as forge welding, this technique is used to connect two pieces of metal by heating them to a high temperature and forcing them together with a hammer or other tool. For this method to be successful, the surface of each piece of metal must be molten. As the smith hammers the pieces together, some metal is forced out from between them, often in the form of a molten jet which cools in the air to form spheroidal hammer scale.

It is also possible for spheroidal hammerscale to form during the purification of bloom steel. Iron oxide can combine with silica, from the raw ore, to form slag. As the bloom is forged and refined, the molten slag is driven out. Once the slag cools, spheroidal hammerscale is formed.

== Use in archaeology ==
=== Ironworking ===
Due to the high volume of hammerscale flakes and spheroid shells produced during regular ironworking processes, archaeologists often use its presence to identify iron smithies and smelters. Hammerscale is easily detected due to its composition and magnetic nature, which allows for it to be easily extracted with a magnet. In addition, again due to its magnetic nature, it is very useful when completing a magnetic susceptibility survey of a site. And, although both finished iron objects and slag are also frequently recovered at former locations of ironworking, hammerscale is arguably a more reliable indicator. Due to their size, iron objects and slag finds are more likely to have been removed or reused, whereas the small hammerscale flakes or spheres were most likely not removed.

In addition, the distribution of hammerscale within an archaeological feature can be used to partially determine the function of each region of the feature. In particular, areas with higher concentrations of hammerscale flakes suggest the presence of an anvil of a hearth as flakes were produced during either the hammering of the iron objects or broken off while heating iron at different stages of purity. In contrast, the presence of large amounts of slag within a confirmed smithy or smelter is less conclusive, though it might indicate waste piles.

Beyond the distribution, the chemical composition and physical characteristics of specific samples of hammerscale can aid archaeologists in determining the purpose of an ironworking feature. In particular, certain samples, such as spheroidal hammerscale, are only produced during certain earlier stages of the iron purification process, providing evidence of smelting activities. The more recognizable, lustrous, and larger flake forms arise almost exclusively from hammering of completed iron objects. By studying the different types of hammerscale present and its prevalence, a trained metallurgist can map out both the purpose of each area of the feature as well as the larger purpose of the entire feature (i.e. smithy or smelter).

=== Collection techniques ===
Due its small size and often darker color, hammerscale is difficult to discover while carrying out simple archaeological processes, such as dry or wet sieving. Instead, when there is clear evidence that a site, such as a pit-house, involved some form of ironworking, archaeologists are advised to form a grid and collect soil from the site for further analysis. This allows for trained metallurgists to analyze the type of hammerscale and their prevalence within the structure. This is still a rare practice for lack of time or expertise, but nevertheless recommended and if untenable, soil samples should still be run over with a magnet so as to collect hammerscale flakes on site.

=== History and sample excavations ===
Seeing as it is a seemingly natural part of earlier ironworking techniques, hammerscale finds have been noted at numerous archaeological excavations in numerous world regions such as Northern Europe, Great Britain, and the Levant.

The earliest mention of hammerscale in an archaeological context derived from a 1941 study of Roman-built fort in Great Britain, located on Hadrian’s wall. An excavation in 1960 of a Roman ironworking site in Norfolk also yielded hammer scale. In more recent excavations, hammerscale recovery has been conducted in a more systematic manner, using the grid method noted above. For example, in an excavation in 1992, by means of establishing a grid and collecting local samples, the former location of a hearth and an anvil was determined despite the lack of the direct remains of either. Arne Jouttijärvi writes of three sites at which hammerscale deposits and concentration were used to map the areas of smithies in Viking Age pithouses in modern-day Denmark and Norway. For example, he writes how the "blacksmith himself shielded the floor where he stood, leaving a 'shadow' in the distribution of hammer scale." Therefore, the distribution of hammerscale is not only able to aid in the location items within a workshop, but can also inform scholars of where the smiths themselves stood.

Smithy discoveries involving hammerscale are well documented and generally a high presence of hammerscale is considered sufficient to identify a find as a smithy. There is even evidence of hammerscale at a Bronze Age site in Upper Bucklebury, West Berkshire, suggesting early ironworking in Britain.
