= Four-die forging device =

Tool used in forging

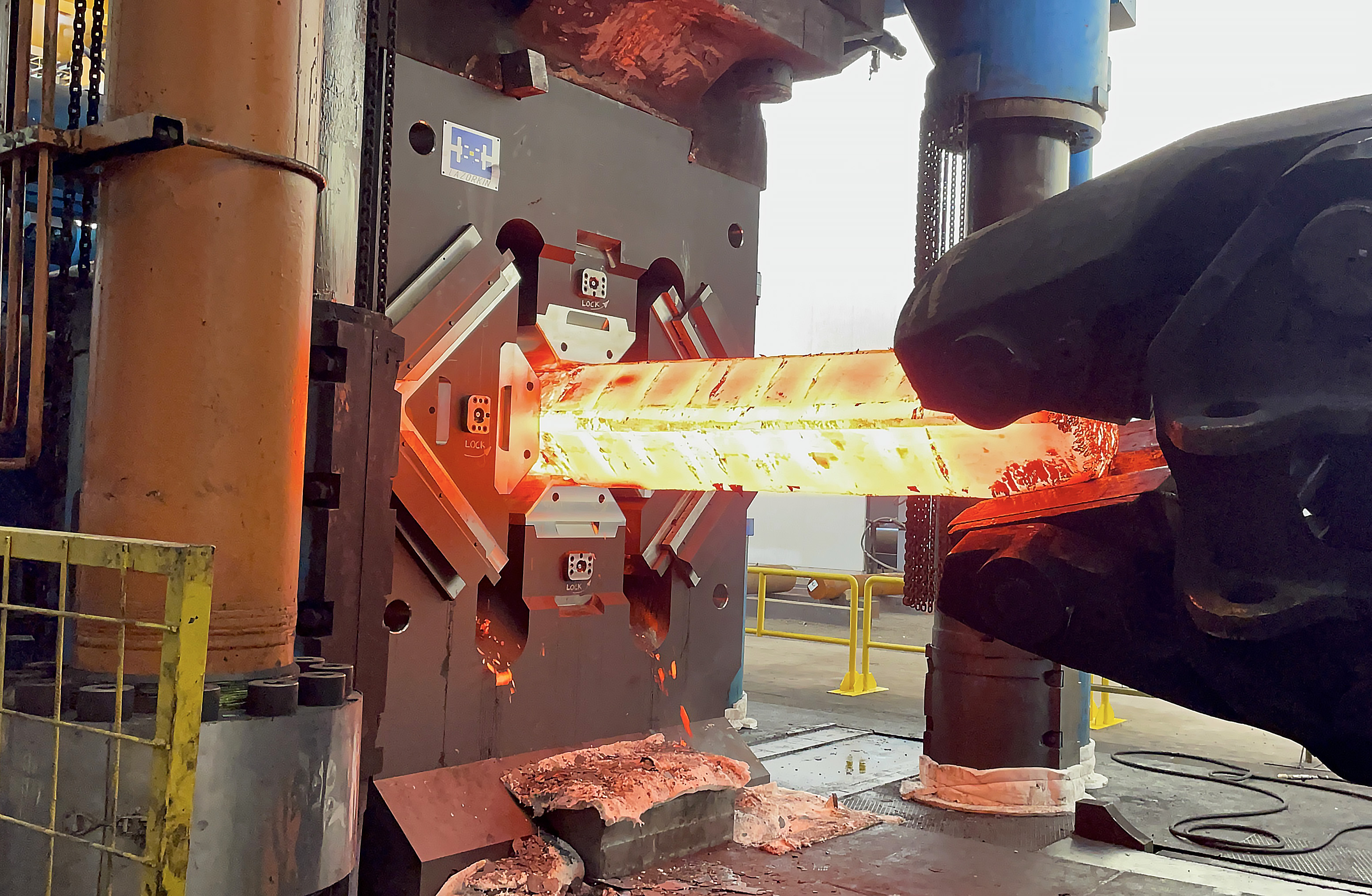
Four-die forging device

Four-die forging device (FDFD) is a special forging tool designed for manufacturing forgings with long axis by four-side radial forging method in conventional open-die hydraulic forging press. A similar stand-alone machine is known as a radial forging machine.

The device is used for deformation treatment of ingots and blanks from ordinary and high-alloy steels and alloys, including hard-to-deform ones, in wide range of shapes and grades to obtain various solid and hollow forgings, including round, square and polygonal forged bars of constant and variable cross-section, blanks of smooth and stepped shafts, axles, thick-wall pipes, mechanical tube, shells, etc.

== Design and Operation ==
The device consists of the upper case and the lower case with the upper die and the lower die installed therein respectively, and sliders that are kinematically interconnected with the cases by means of guides of special design and hold side dies attached thereto. The device is installed on a tool table of an open-die forging press as easy as ordinary dies. Thereat, the lower case of the device is fixed to the tool table and always remains stationary while the upper case is attached to the press ram and always travels along with it. When the press ram goes up the upper die also goes up and the side dies are retracted opening the device working space whereto a work piece is fed by a manipulator. When the press ram goes down the work piece is reduced simultaneously by four dies. Then the cycle repeats.

== From Two Dies to Four ==
The second half of the 19th century was marked with the appearance of hydraulic forging presses that started to replace hammers at forging works. Forging in forging presses is carried out by two dies of which one makes reciprocal movements and the other one remains stationary. This is the reason for relatively low productivity and high labour intensity of conventional forging in presses. The forging of low-ductility and hard-to-deform steels and alloys by two dies using conventional forging methods is very difficult and sometimes is practically impossible because of high tensile stresses in deformation zone leading to various forging defects and high percentage of rejected products. In the 1970s the mechanical radial forging machines (RFM) started to be used for the large-scale production of long-axis forgings where a work piece is reduced in radial directions simultaneously by several pairs of dies. The process of radial forging in mechanical RFM features high productivity of forging. However small single reductions of a work piece restricted by the design of these machines lead to localization of strains mainly in surface zones of the work piece while metal in the core zone remains unworked. In 80-90s hydro-mechanical and hydraulic radial forging machines appeared that do not have the disadvantages inherent to mechanical RFM. Nevertheless, radial forging machines are very specific and very expensive equipment in comparison with multipurpose forging presses. The application of such machines at enterprises with a wide range of forgings manufactured is economically disadvantageous and inexpedient. The problem of manufacturing long-axis forgings by radial forging method in open-die hydraulic forging presses can be solved with use of multi-die forging devices. First such devices different in design and principle of operation appeared in the 1980s. At present, the most widespread and famous is the four-die forging device of the above described design engineered by Ukrainian scientists. The four-die forging devices have no analogues in the world now. They are successfully used at works in Ukraine, Spain, China, Russia, Germany, Italy, Japan, Brasil, Korea, India and Turkey.

== Advantages of Forging with Four-Die Forging Device ==
The use of four-die forging devices in hydraulic forging presses provides for the following advantages in comparison with conventional methods of forging by two dies:

- Capability of forging low-ductility and hard-to-deform steels and alloys due to favourable stress and strain state of metal in the zone of deformation
- Increase in the forging process productivity at the average by 2 times due to the absence of lateral spread of metal and consequently the lower number of press strokes required to obtain the forging of the required size and shape
- Electric power saving because of lower press running time as well as lower consumption of energy carriers required to reheat metal between forging passes and lower metal loss during reheating
- Higher dimensional accuracy of forgings after sizing in the device allowing to decrease forging tolerances by 2-2.5 times and forging allowances by 1.5 time for further machining
- Higher metal yield by 10-12%
- High flexibility in operation and fast adjustment of equipment to varying range of forging stock
- Relatively low cost, low operating expenses and high reliability of the four-die forging device proven by many years of its industrial operation.

== See also ==
1. www.fdforging.com-official website of the FDFD manufacturer.
2. V. А. Lazorkin, D. V. Lazorkin. / Technologies, machines and devices for forging between four dies: monograph – Second Edition Revised and Enlarged. – Zaporozhye : STATUS, 2023. – 336 p.
3. V. Lazorkin, D. Lazorkin, R. Onischenko, S. Kuralekh. / New design solutions of Four - Die Forging Devices (FDFDs) and their technological capabilities. FIA Magazine I, November 2020, p. 110-116. https://user-zaechmz.cld.bz/November-2020-Volume-2/110/
4. Viktor Lazorkin, Yuriy Melnykov. New Technologies of Forging of Ingots and Blanks by Four Dies in Open-Die Forging Presses. Proc. 18th IFM 2011, Sep. 12–15, Pittsburgh, USA, p. 326-332 (in English).
5. M. Todokoro, A. Aoyama, S. Tanaka, Y.Kumagai - The Japan Steel Works M&E, Inc., Japan, V. Lazorkin, D. Lazorkin – Lazorkin-Engineering, LLC, Ukraine. / Improving the efficiency of the round bar forging process by Four-Die Forging Device (FDFD). Proc. 22nd IFM-2024, May. 27 – 30, Milano, Italy, p. IFM-047.
6. Roberto Tiburcio C. Frota Junior, Gustavo Acarine De Campos, Paulo :Augusto Morais De Oliveira, Gerson Graciano - Villares Metals S.A., Brasil / Comparison between four die forging device and conventional forging processes of cold work tool steel. Proc. 20th IFM-2017, Sept. 15-19, Congress Graz, Austria, p. 545-553.
7. J. R. Gonzalez, P. F. David, J. Cordon, J. M. Llanos. FEM simulation of the new radial forging device process at Sidenor. Proc. 17th IFM 2008, Nov. 3-7 Santander, Spain, p. 237-243 (in English).
