= Jingyang, Deyang =

Jingyang 旌阳区
- District
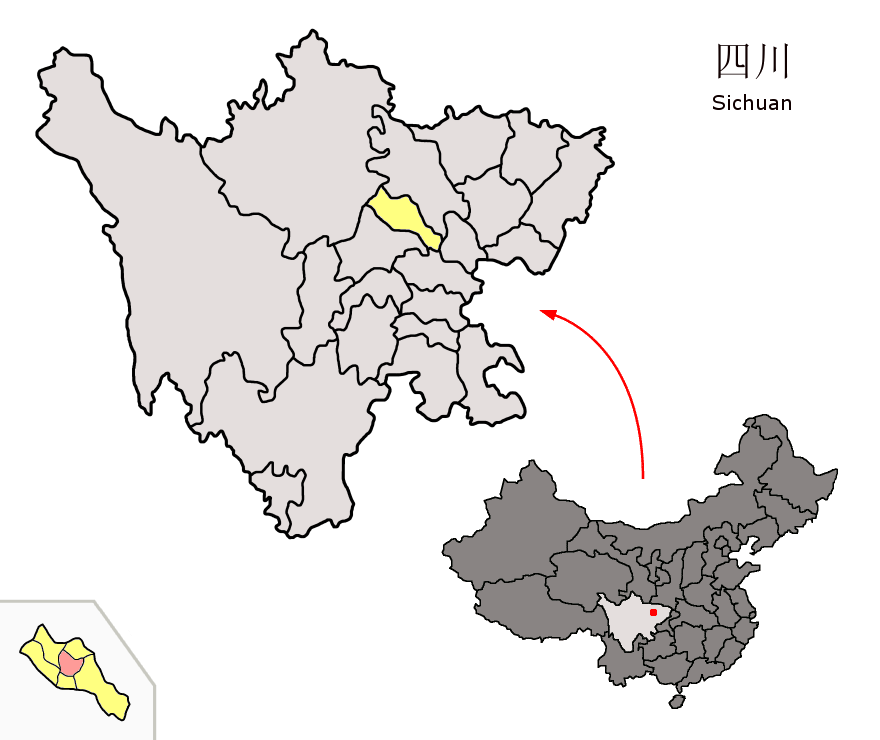
- Location of Jingyang in Sichuan
- Country: China
- Province: Sichuan
- Prefecture-level city: Deyang
- District seat: Jingdong Subdistrict

Area
  - Total: 684 km^{2} (264 sq mi)

Population (2020)
  - Total: 828,189
  - Density: 1,210/km^{2} (3,140/sq mi)
- Time zone: UTC+8 (China Standard)
- Website: www.tfjy.gov.cn

Jingyang District (simplified Chinese: 旌阳区; traditional Chinese: 旌陽區; pinyin: Jīngyáng Qū) is a district of the city of Deyang, Sichuan Province, China.

== Administrative divisions ==
Jingyang District administers 6 subdistricts and 7 towns:

- Jingyang Subdistrict (旌阳街道)
- Jingdong Subdistrict (旌东街道)
- Bajiaojing Subdistrict (八角井街道)
- Donghu Subdistrict (东湖街道)
- Tianyuan Subdistrict (天元街道)
- Xiaogan Subdistrict (孝感街道)
- Huangxu Town (黄许镇)
- Xiaoquan Town (孝泉镇)
- Bailong Town (柏隆镇)
- Dexin Town (德新镇)
- Shuangdong Town (双东镇)
- Xinzhong Town (新中镇)
- Hexin Town (和新镇)

== Transport ==
- Jingyang railway station will be a future infill station on Chengdu–Mianyang–Leshan intercity railway.

== Notable villages ==
Wuhui village (五会村) in Xiaoquan town (孝泉镇) in Jingyang District covers an area of 4.8 square kilometers. The area of the cultivated land is 5,000 mu (about 823.68 acres). As of c. 2015 it had a population of 4,274. There were a total of 1,473 households.
