= Chengdu–Mianyang–Leshan intercity railway =

Railway line in Sichuan, China

Chengdu–Mianyang–Leshan intercity railway 成绵乐客运专线

Overview
- Status: Operating
- Locale: Sichuan, China
- Termini: Jiangyou; Emeishan
- Stations: 21

Service
- Type: Higher-speed rail
- Operator: China Railway High-speed

Technical
- Line length: 314 km (195 mi)
- Track gauge: 1,435 mm (4 ft 8 1/2 in) standard gauge
- Electrification: 25 kV 50 Hz
- Operating speed: 250 km/h (155 mph)

Chengdu–Mianyang–Leshan intercity railway (simplified Chinese: 成绵乐客运专线; traditional Chinese: 成綿樂客運專線; pinyin: Chéng-Mián-Lè Kèyùn Zhuānxiàn) is a higher-speed intercity railway in Sichuan Province that connects Mianyang, Deyang, Chengdu, Meishan, Leshan and Emei. The line is 314 km (195 mi) in length and can accommodate trains traveling at the speed of 200 km/h (124 mph). Construction began in 2008 and was completed on June 29, 2014. Revenue service began on December 20, 2014.

== Route & service ==
Under the plan, the Chengdu–Mianyang–Leshan intercity railway starts at the renovated Chengdu railway station, going north through Deyang to Mianyang, stopping at Jiangyou. Southbound, the railway line passes through Chengdu Shuangliu International Airport to Meishan and Leshan, ending in Emei. Altogether ten cities, namely Jiangyou, Mianyang, Deyang, Guanghan, Chengdu, Pengshan, Meishan, Jiajiang, Leshan and Emei, are linked together from north to south by the railway. The length of the two-way passenger line is total 314 km (195 mi), with a designed speed of 200 km/h (124 mph).

There are 21 stations along the route. Like public buses, the intercity trains run from 6 a.m. till 11 p.m. During peak hours, a train leaves the station every few minutes.

== History ==
The Chengdu–Mianyang–Leshan intercity railway was a major reconstruction project in Sichuan following the earthquake of May 2008. The National Development and Reform Commission (NDRC) approved the construction of the passenger railway line running from Jiangyou to Chengdu and Emei at a cost of RMB 42 billion. Upon completion of this intercity line, it would take only 51 and 54 minutes respectively to travel by train from Chengdu to Jiangyou and E'mei situated at both ends of the line. Trains can easily pass through 10 cities within two hours.

Construction began on December 20, 2008, and was expected to take four years. The line opened on December 20, 2014.
