= Deyang =

Deyang 德阳市
- Prefecture-level city
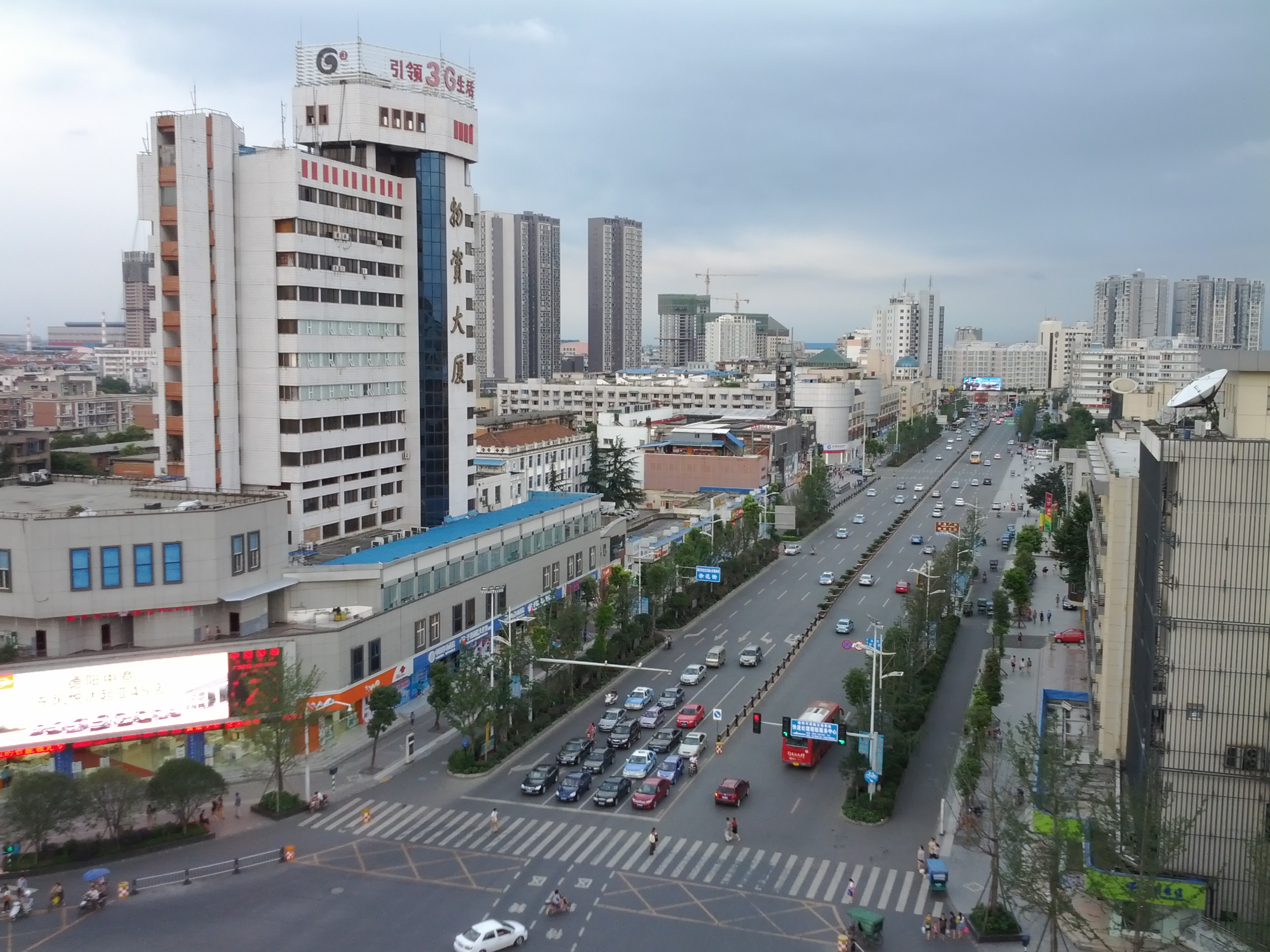

- Location of Deyang City jurisdiction in Sichuan

- Location in China Deyang (China)
- Coordinates (Deyang municipal government): 31°07′37″N 104°23′53″E
- Country: People's Republic of China
- Province: Sichuan
- Municipal seat: Jingyang District

Area
  - Total: 5,818 km^{2} (2,246 sq mi)

Population (2020)
  - Total: 3,456,161
  - Density: 594.0/km^{2} (1,539/sq mi)

GDP
  - Total: CN¥ 160.5 billion US$ 25.8 billion
  - Per capita: CN¥ 45,702; US$ 7,338
- Time zone: UTC+8 (China Standard)
- Postal code: 618000
- Area code: 0838
- ISO 3166 code: CN-SC-06
- Website: www.deyang.gov.cn

Deyang (Chinese: 德阳; pinyin: Déyáng) is a prefecture-level city of Sichuan province, China. Deyang is a largely industrial city, with companies such as China National Erzhong Group and Dongfang Electric having major operations there. The city is rich in history, with the Sanxingdui archeological site in Guanghan uncovering a rich trove of bronze and gold masks. More recently, Deyang was greatly afflicted by the 2008 Sichuan earthquake, which particularly impacted its county-level cities of Mianzhu and Shifang, in Deyang's northwest. Deyang spans an area of 5,911 km^{2} (2,282 mi^{2}).

== History ==
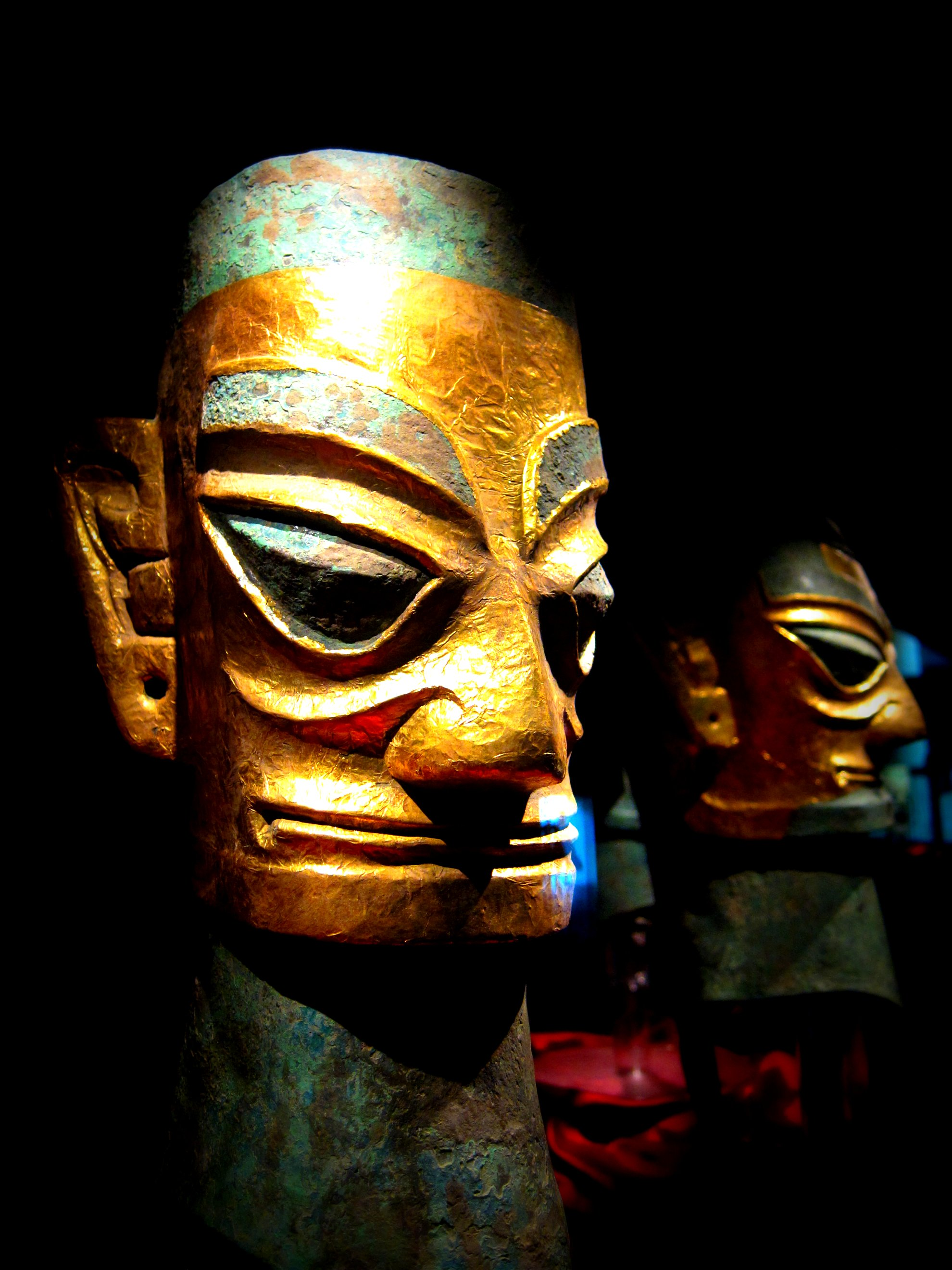
Bronze heads adorned with gold masks found at the Sanxingdui site

The ancient Shu civilization included present-day Deyang, which is home to the Sanxingdui relics.

Deyang was first organized as a county during the Tang dynasty.

During the Third Front campaign, Deyang developed into an industrial base, the second largest in Sichuan.

Deyang became a prefecture-level city in 1983.

On August 3, 1996, Deyang's Shizhong District (Chinese: 市中区) was split into Jingyang District and Luojiang County (now Luojiang District).

=== 2008 Earthquake ===
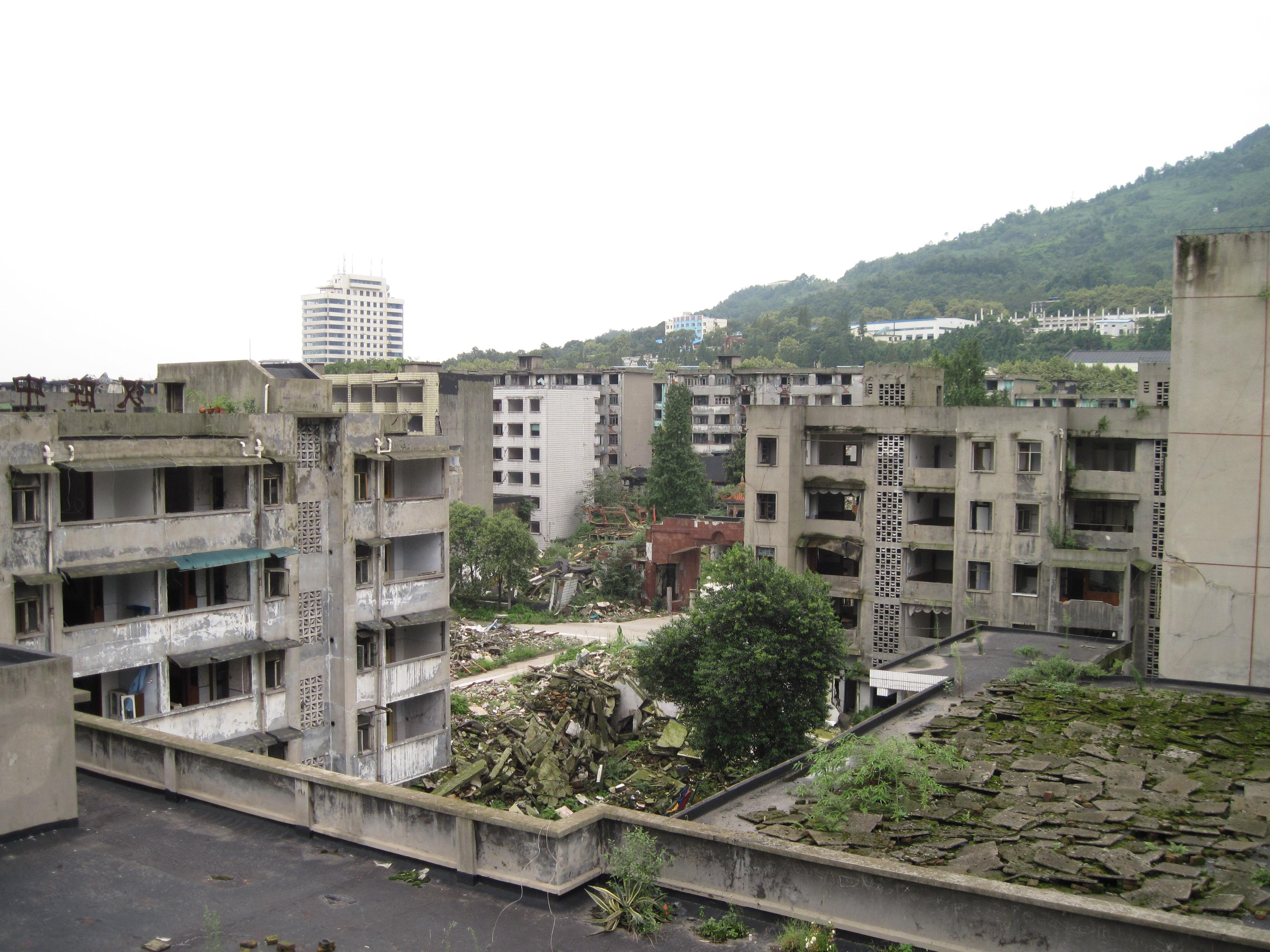
Buildings in Mianzhu destroyed by the 2008 Sichuan earthquake

On May 12, 2008, a magnitude 8.0 earthquake stuck Wenchuan, roughly 100 km west of downtown Deyang, resulting extremely heavy human losses. Of the 87,150 deaths and missings, 17,599 were reported in Deyang. School buildings in Mianzhu and Shifang were destroyed by the earthquake, leaving hundreds buried.

Deyang has mostly recovered from the devastation of the 2008 earthquake with most people now compensated where required (injuries, etc.) and established in new houses. In some cases they are in new areas, as well as factories and work being re-established. For the new houses, in most cases, the owners are requested to meet 30% of the cost while the government covers the rest. While the government didn't meet its initial (and ambitious) one-year plan to rehouse all victims, it did manage to mostly be successful within two years. In the meantime, residents lived in government-provided mobile home type cities with weekly cash payments for all victims to purchase food and clothing.

== Geography ==
Deyang is located in the northeastern portion of the Chengdu Plain, with the Longquan Mountains to the east lying in between the city and the larger Sichuan Basin. Deyang's urban core, Jingyang, is located on the Mianyuan River, which passes under seven bridges flowing north to south. The river has been widened, five of the bridges are part dams, and it has assumed the name of Jing Lake.

Deyang is located directly north of Chengdu, less than an hour's drive. Deyang's urban core is 24 kilometres (15 mi) away from Qingbaijiang railway station, and 50 kilometres (31 mi) away from Chengdu Shuangliu International Airport.

=== Climate ===
Deyang experiences a humid subtropical climate, with four distinct seasons. The coldest month in Deyang is January, and the hottest month is July. Most precipitation in Deyang occurs during the summer months. The annual frost-free period in Deyang typically lasts between 270 and 290 days, and snowfall typically only occurs on a handful of days. Deyang experiences its strongest winds from March to May, and its calmest winds typically happen between October and February.

Climate data for Deyang, elevation 526 m (1,726 ft), (1991–2020 normals, extremes 1981–present)
Month	Jan	Feb	Mar	Apr	May	Jun	Jul	Aug	Sep	Oct	Nov	Dec	Year
Record high °C (°F)	19.9 (67.8)	22.7 (72.9)	31.8 (89.2)	36.7 (98.1)	37.9 (100.2)	39.2 (102.6)	37.9 (100.2)	42.7 (108.9)	36.2 (97.2)	32.4 (90.3)	25.5 (77.9)	18.8 (65.8)	42.7 (108.9)
Mean daily maximum °C (°F)	10.1 (50.2)	12.9 (55.2)	18.3 (64.9)	24.4 (75.9)	27.7 (81.9)	29.7 (85.5)	31.1 (88.0)	31.7 (89.1)	26.2 (79.2)	21.4 (70.5)	16.3 (61.3)	11.3 (52.3)	21.8 (71.2)
Daily mean °C (°F)	5.9 (42.6)	8.4 (47.1)	13.0 (55.4)	18.1 (64.6)	21.7 (71.1)	24.4 (75.9)	25.9 (78.6)	26.1 (79.0)	21.7 (71.1)	17.2 (63.0)	12.2 (54.0)	7.0 (44.6)	16.8 (62.3)
Mean daily minimum °C (°F)	3.0 (37.4)	5.1 (41.2)	9.2 (48.6)	13.6 (56.5)	17.3 (63.1)	20.7 (69.3)	22.5 (72.5)	22.4 (72.3)	19.1 (66.4)	14.8 (58.6)	9.6 (49.3)	4.2 (39.6)	13.5 (56.2)
Record low °C (°F)	−5.0 (23.0)	−3.4 (25.9)	−2.3 (27.9)	4.7 (40.5)	7.5 (45.5)	14.6 (58.3)	16.8 (62.2)	16.6 (61.9)	12.8 (55.0)	4.1 (39.4)	0.0 (32.0)	−5.2 (22.6)	−5.2 (22.6)
Average precipitation mm (inches)	7.3 (0.29)	9.7 (0.38)	20.2 (0.80)	42.5 (1.67)	74.0 (2.91)	106.4 (4.19)	222.3 (8.75)	179.5 (7.07)	126.9 (5.00)	38.3 (1.51)	11.9 (0.47)	5.2 (0.20)	844.2 (33.24)
Average precipitation days (≥ 0.1 mm)	5.7	6.4	9.3	11.2	12.5	13.8	15.2	14.1	14.6	13.2	5.7	4.6	126.3
Average snowy days	1.2	0.4	0	0	0	0	0	0	0	0	0	0.3	1.9
Average relative humidity (%)	79	77	74	72	70	76	81	81	82	82	81	80	78
Mean monthly sunshine hours	50.8	53.4	81.6	115.0	118.9	102.5	117.4	131.7	68.7	55.1	54.1	51.5	1,000.7
Percentage possible sunshine	16	17	22	30	28	24	27	32	19	16	17	16	22
Source: China Meteorological Administration all-time extreme temperature

== Subdivisions ==
Map
Name	Hanzi	Hanyu Pinyin	Population (2020)	Area (km^{2})	Density (/km^{2})
Jingyang District	旌阳区	Jīngyáng Qū	1,066,386 (Note: including the Economic Development Zone)	650	1,641
Luojiang District	罗江区	Luójiāng Qū	209,088	369	566
Shifang City	什邡市	Shífāng Shì	406,775	820	496
Guanghan City	广汉市	Guǎnghàn Shì	626,132	456	1372
Mianzhu City	绵竹市	Miánzhú Shì	439,958	1,221	360
Zhongjiang County	中江县	Zhōngjiāng Xiàn	946,019	2,154	439

== Demographics ==
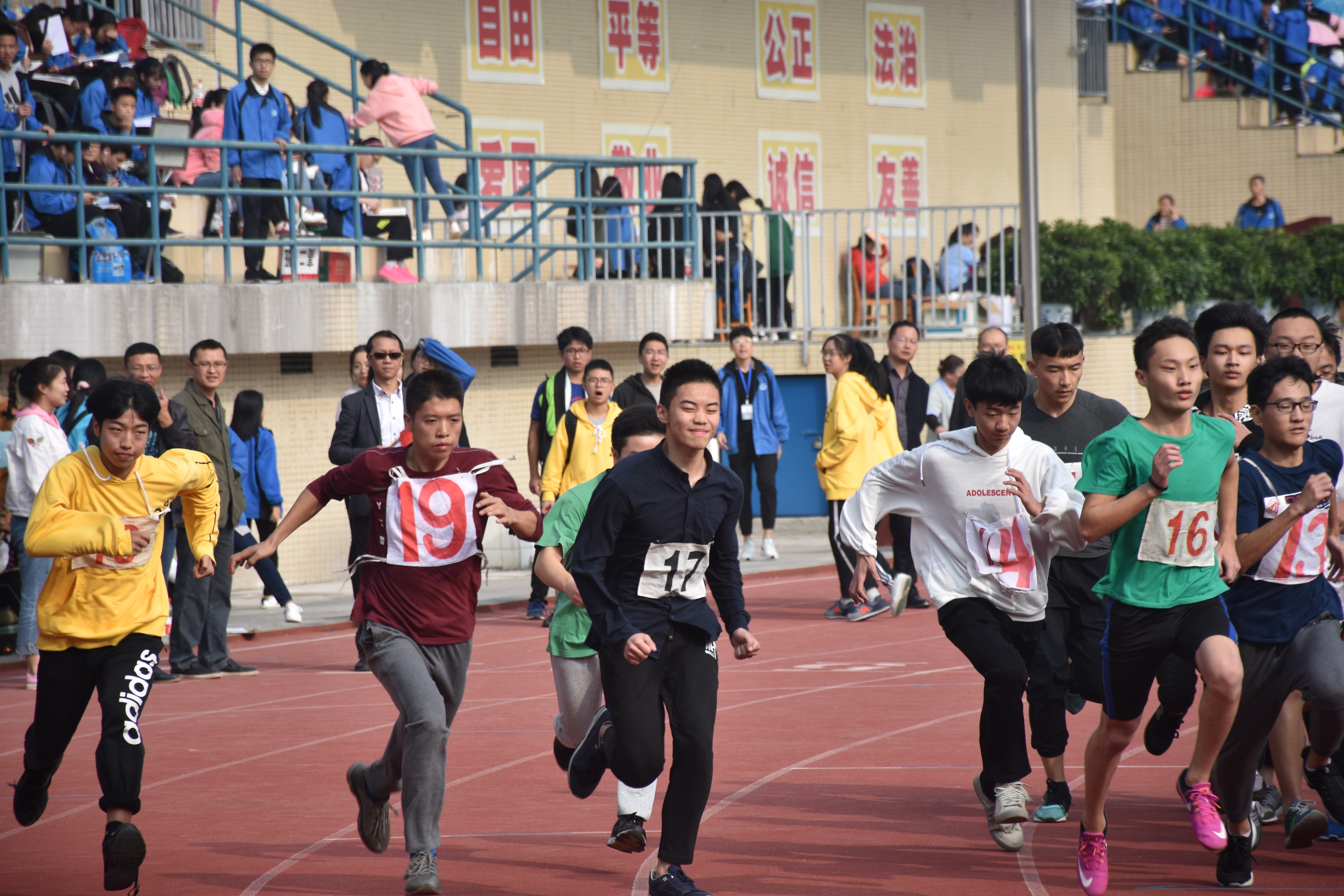
A track meet at a secondary school in Jingyang District

According to the 2020 Chinese census, Deyang has a population of 3,456,161. During the first half of the 2010s, Deyang's population fell by about 100,000 people, although its population had slightly rebounded in the latter half of the 2010s. In the 2010 Chinese Census, Deyang's population totaled 3,615,758, and in the 2000 Chinese Census, its population was 3,788,056. The resident population at the end of 2024 is 3.454 million, an increase of 10,000 over the end of the previous year, including 2.064 million in urban areas and 1.39 million in rural areas.

Throughout the 2010s, Deyang experienced increased urbanization, with its urbanization rate increasing from 41.32% in 2010 to 53.89% in 2019. Deyang has a sex ratio of approximately 103 males per 100 females.

=== Ethnic groups ===
99.24% of the city's population is ethnically Han Chinese, with the remaining 0.76% of the population belonging to 51 officially recognized ethnic minorities. Major ethnic minorities in Deyang include the Hui, Tibetans, the Yi, and the Qiang.

==== Hui people ====
The Hui people are the largest ethnic minority in Deyang. The Hui people of Deyang live in a number of different areas, including along North Street (Chinese: 北街; pinyin: Běi Jiē) and the town of Xiaoquan in Jingyang District, the town of Luoshui in Shifang, and in portions of Guanghan.

== Economy ==
As of 2019, Deyang has a gross domestic product (GDP) of 233.591 billion RMB, of which, 23.460 billion RMB comes from the primary sector, 118.439 billion RMB comes from the secondary sector, and 91.692 billion RMB comes from the tertiary sector. Compared to Sichuan as a whole, Deyang is more reliant on its secondary sector, which is responsible for 50.70% of Deyang's total GDP, while making up 37.25% of Sichuan's GDP. In 2019, Deyang's annual GDP growth was 7.2%, slightly below Sichuan's growth rate of 7.5%. GDP per capita growth in Deyang was 6.7% that same year, again slightly below the Sichuan total of 7.0%.

As of 2019, Deyang's gross domestic product per capita totals 65,745 RMB, higher than the Sichuan average of 55,774 RMB. However, the average annual wage in Deyang is 63,585 RMB per year, slightly below the Sichuan average of 69,267 RMB per year. On average, workers in Deyang's urban areas earn 37,222 RMB of disposable income annually, well below the Sichuan average of 45,878 RMB per year. Workers in Deyang's rural areas earn an average of 18,249 RMB in disposable income annually, below the Sichuan average of 24,357 RMB per year. The highest paying industry in Deyang is healthcare and social service, which pays, on average, 101,293 RMB per year, slightly below the Sichuan average of 192,904 RMB per year. The lowest paying industry in Deyang is the agriculture, forestry, and fishing industry, which pays, on average, 28,812 RMB per year, significantly below the Sichuan average of 51,754 RMB per year. 32.1% of Deyang's workforce is employed in the primary sector, 27.7% is employed in the secondary sector, and 40.2% is employed in the tertiary sector. Of Deyang's 2.17 million workers, about 697,500 work in agriculture, forestry, and fishing.

=== Industry ===
Deyang is an important part of Cheng (Chengdu) De (Deyang) Mian (Mianyang) Economic District of the Sichuan province, a base for heavy machinery production in China. Companies with operations in Deyang include China National Erzhong Group, Dongfang Electric, and Honghua Group Limited. Deyang produces large amounts of electrical equipment, including components for nuclear power plants, hydropower plants, steam turbines, and various casts.

In addition, Deyang also has a sizable light industry, in particular, the food industry. A number of brands, such as Jiannan Chunjiu (Chinese: 剑南春酒), Great Wall Cigar (Chinese: 长城雪茄), and Bingchuan Shidai Mineral Water (Chinese: 冰川时代矿泉水). Other major manufacturers include Lan Jian Beer Factory & Shifang Tobacco Company. According to the Deyang city government, Great Wall Cigar's plant in Deyang is the largest cigar factory in all of Asia.

Despite Deyang's sizable industry, air quality is relatively good.

== Culture ==
The county-level city of Mianzhu has its own distinct style of New Year pictures, known as the Mianzhu New Year picture.

== Cuisine ==
Fruit Juice Beef: As a local specialty of Xiaoquan, its taste is described as being absolutely superb: the outer skin is crispy and fragrant, while the inside is tender and melts in your mouth.

Lianshan Twice-Cooked Pork: Its preparation is extremely meticulous. First, the pork is boiled until it is 80% cooked, then it is taken out and cut into long, rolled slices with alternating layers of fat and lean meat. Each slice is 30-40 centimeters long, which is visually impressive.

Zhongjiang Handmade Noodles: Zhongjiang handmade noodles were listed as an intangible cultural heritage in 2010, carrying a thousand-year-old handcrafted heritage.

Shifang Salted Duck is characterized by its crispy skin, tender meat, and savory flavor. Despite its relatively high oil content, it is not considered greasy and is associated with a traditional preparation method passed down through generations.

Luojiang Bean Chicken: Luojiang Bean Chicken is a well-known local specialty snack in Deyang with a history of hundreds of years. Although its name contains "chicken," it has nothing to do with chicken meat.

Guanghan Braised Rabbit: Braised rabbit has a crispy and chewy outer skin, while the meat inside is tender and juicy. It has a rich, numbing aroma that is not overpowering, and every bite is full of flavor.

== Transportation ==
Both the Chengdu Second Ring Expressway and the Chengdu Third Ring Expressway passes through Deyang. Other major expressways in Deyang include the Chengwan Expressway, the G42 Shanghai–Chengdu Expressway, and China National Highway 108.

Numerous railways run through the city, including the Chengdu–Mianyang–Leshan intercity railway, the Baoji–Chengdu railway, and the Dazhou–Chengdu railway.

Deyang also has an extensive bus service and taxis.

Chengdu Metro line S11, currently under construction as of 2026, is planned to connect Deyang to Chengdu.

== Tourism ==
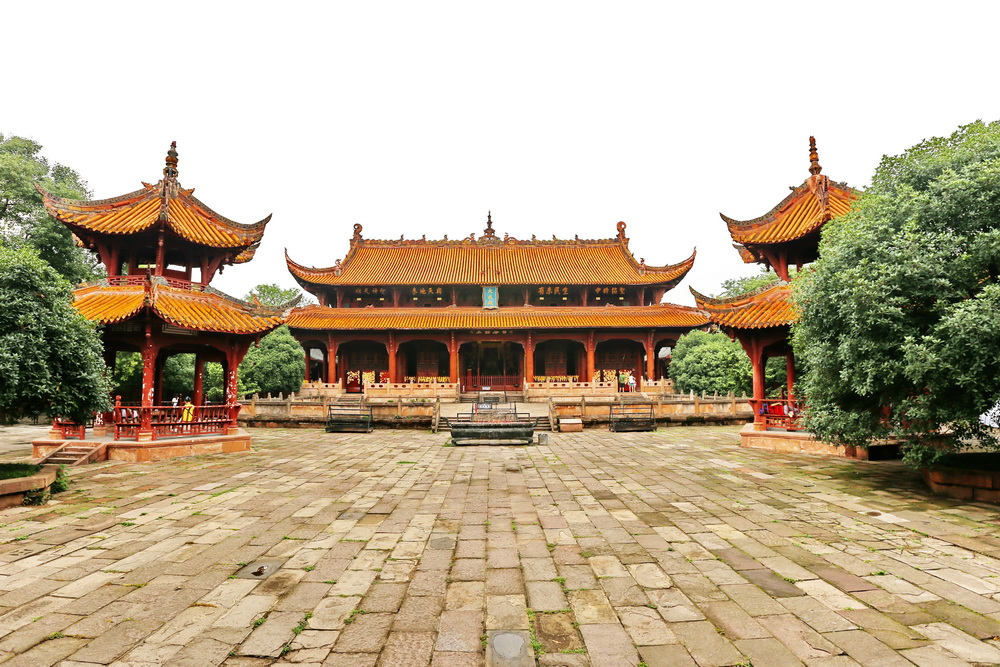
The Deyang Confucian Temple

Deyang is home to a number of major historical sites, including the Sanxingdui site, Baimaguan Pangtong Temple (Chinese: 白马关庞统祠), and the Deyang Confucian Temple. Other sites include the Huang Jiguang Memorial Hall (Chinese: 黄继光纪念馆), honoring Chinese soldier Huang Jiguang. The Longmenshan National Park (Chinese: 龙门山国家地质公园) is also located in Deyang.

== Sister cities ==
Deyang is a sister city with Muncie, Indiana;

- Vladimir, Russia, since 1994;
- Kreis Siegen-Wittgenstein, Germany, since 1996;
- L'Alcúdia, Spain, since 1997;
- Lahti, Finland, since 2000;
