= Winch =

Mechanical device used to adjust rope tension

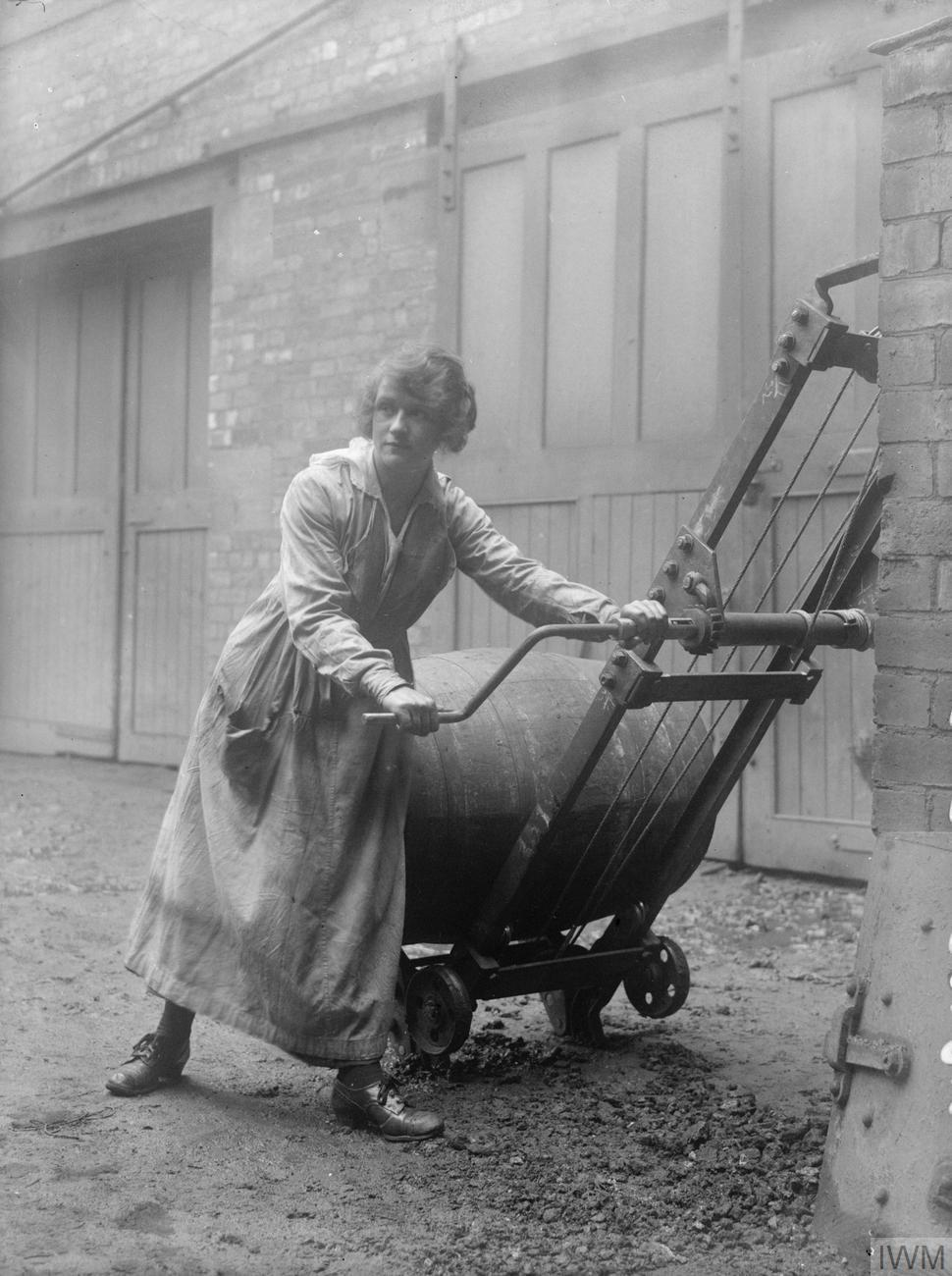
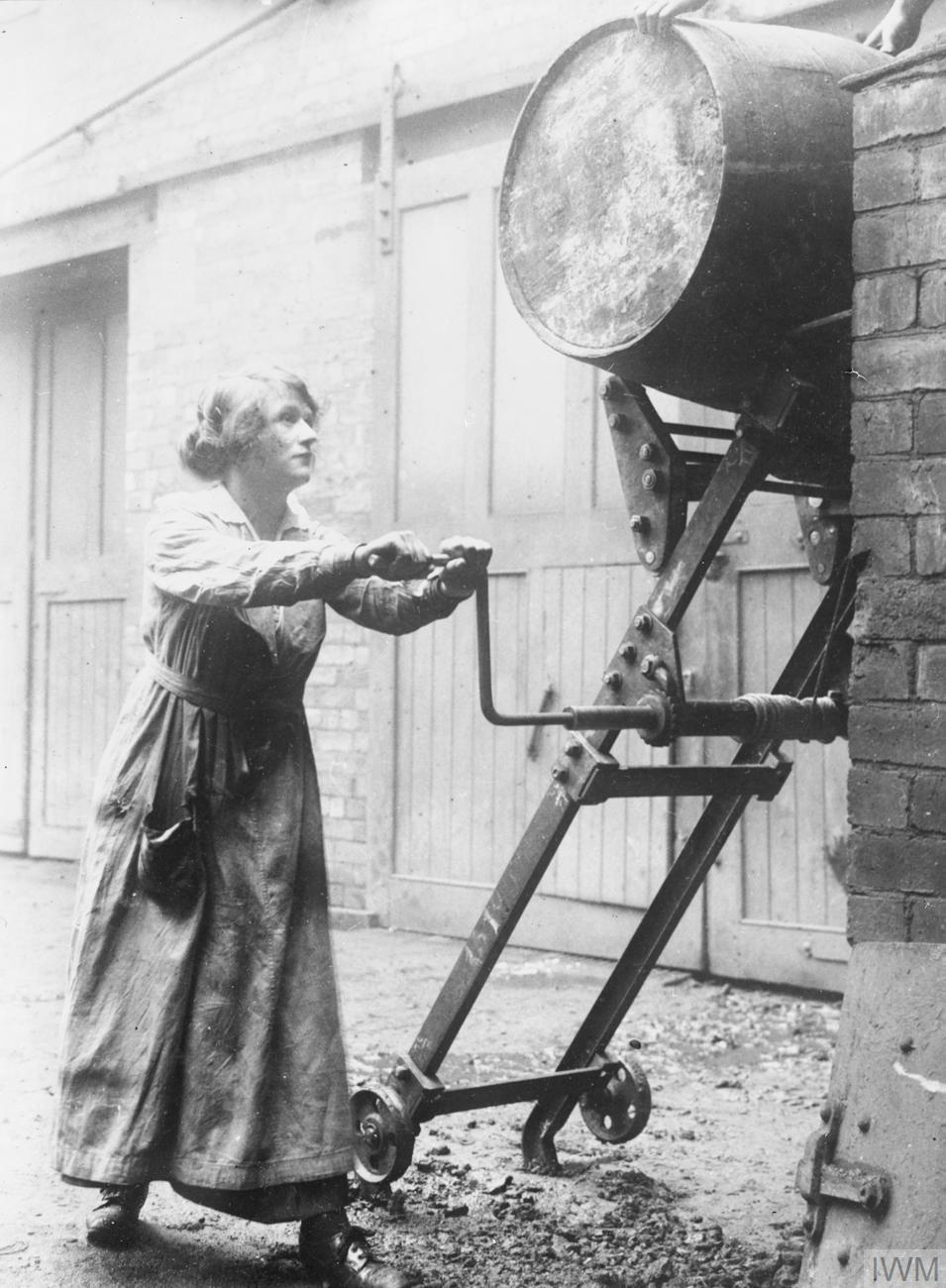
A barrel lifter, operated using a hand-powered winch

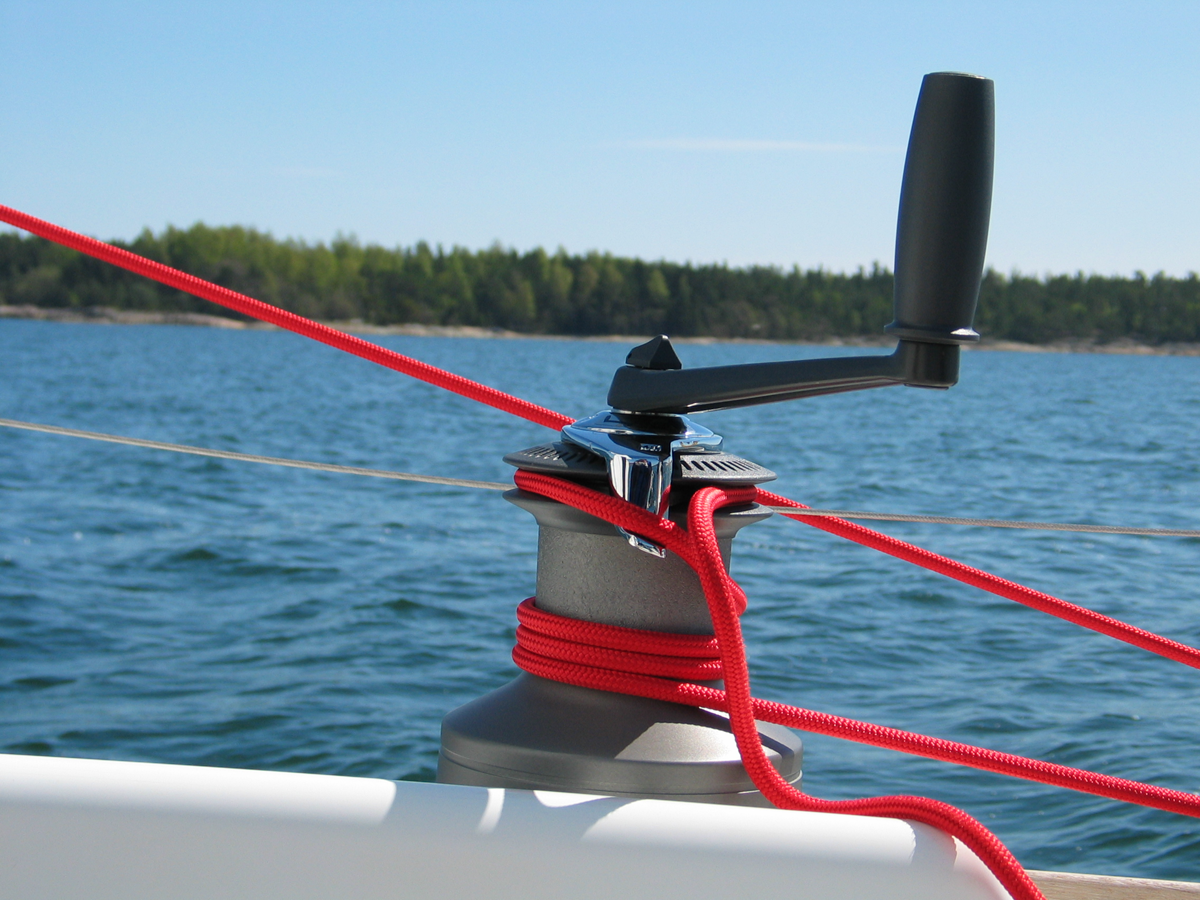
Self-tailing winch on a sailboat. A sheet line runs from the sail (left, not shown) behind the winch to a block (lower right, not shown) and only from there back to the winch (lower part). The handle is detachable to ease line handling.

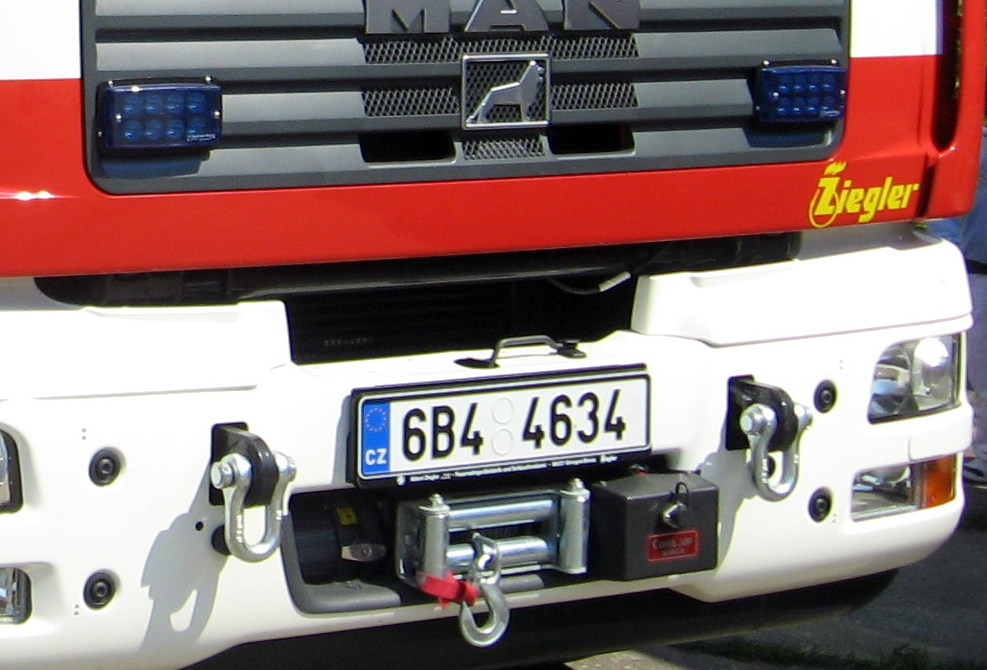
Front of a MAN-based fire engine with a built-in winch, e.g. for towing damaged cars after an accident

A winch is a mechanical device that is used to pull in (wind up) or let out (wind out) or otherwise adjust the tension of a rope or wire rope (also called "cable" or "wire cable").

In its simplest form, it consists of a spool (or drum) attached to a hand crank. Traditionally, winches on ships accumulated wire or rope on the drum; those that do not accumulate, and instead pass on the wire/rope (see yacht photo above), are called capstans. Despite this, sailboat capstans are most often referred to as winches. Winches are the basis of such machines as tow trucks, steam shovels and elevators. More complex designs have gear assemblies and can be powered by electric, hydraulic, pneumatic or internal combustion drives. It might include a solenoid brake or a mechanical brake or ratchet and pawl which prevents it unwinding unless the pawl is retracted. The rope may be stored on the winch. When trimming a line on a sailboat, the crew member turns the winch handle with one hand, while tailing (pulling on the loose tail end) with the other to maintain tension on the turns. Some winches have a "stripper" or cleat to maintain tension. These are known as "self-tailing" winches.

== History ==
=== In the Ancient World ===
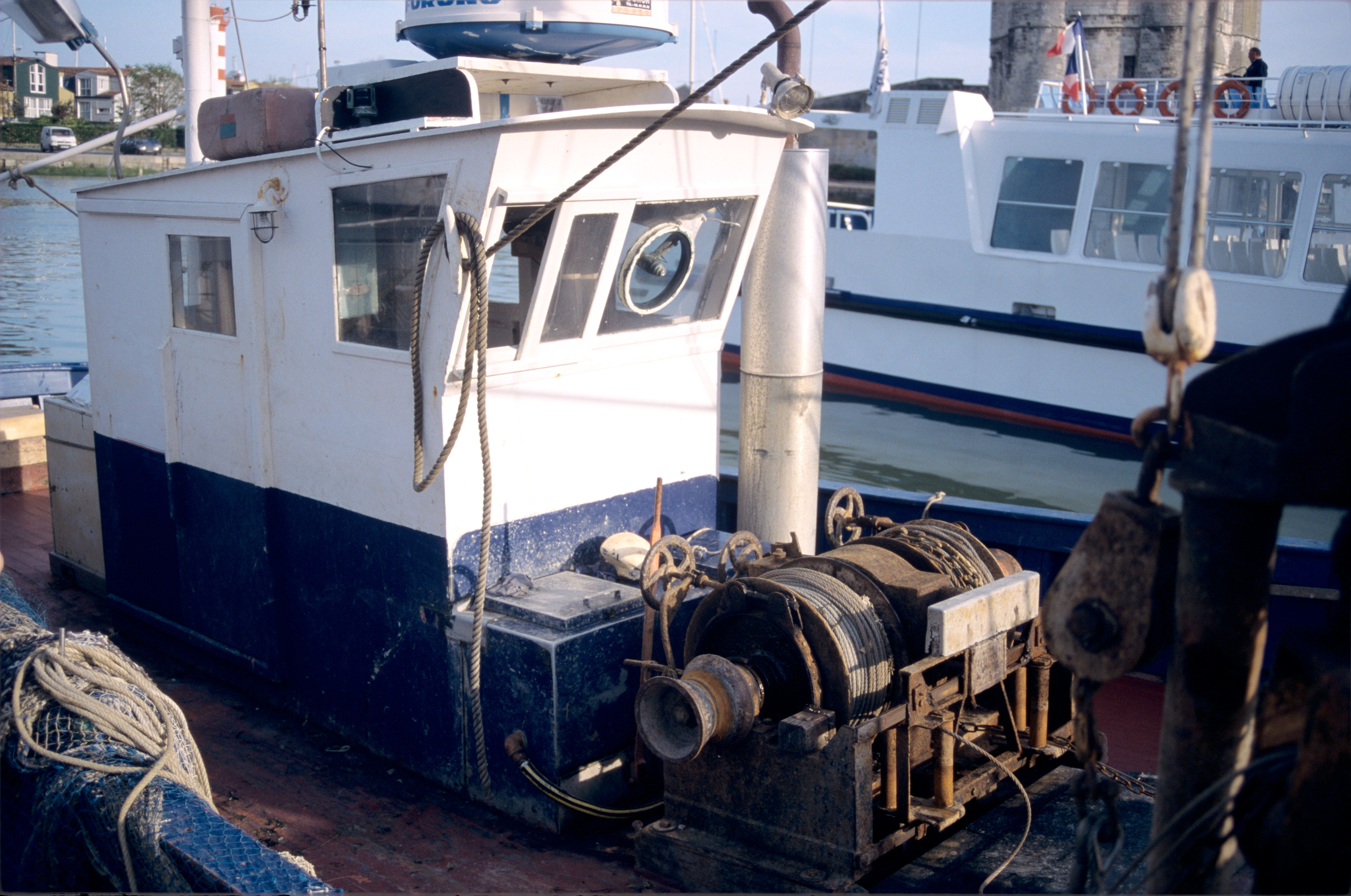
Winch used on a fishing boat to bring in nets

The earliest literary reference to a winch can be found in the account of Herodotus of Halicarnassus on the Persian Wars (Histories 7.36), where he describes how wooden winches were used to tighten the cables for a pontoon bridge across the Hellespont in 480 BCE. Winches may have been employed even earlier in Assyria.

By the 4th century BCE, winch and pulley hoists were regarded by Aristotle as common for architectural use (Mech. 18; 853b10-13).

=== In the 20th Century ===
The yacht Reliance, American defender of the 1903 America's Cup, was the first racing boat to be fitted with modern winches below decks. The Reliance's competitors relied on muscle power using topside mounted capstans and windlasses, which would soon be replaced in most applications by winches, including on fishing boats, where they are used to bring in the fishing nets.

== Other applications ==
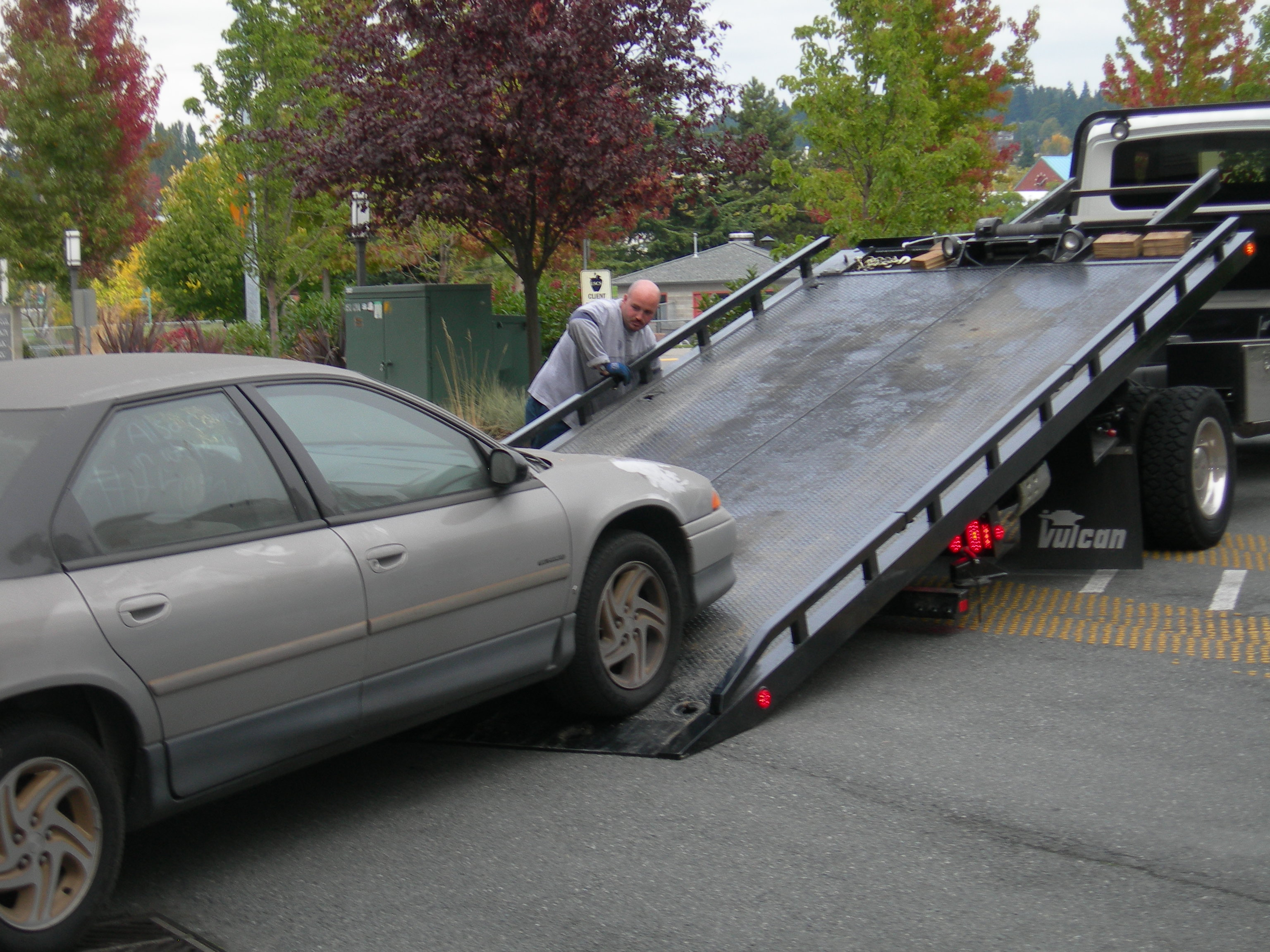
Winching a car onto a tow truck

=== Vehicle recovery ===
The main feature that legally distinguishes a tow truck from a conventional truck in many jurisdictions is the presence of a winch, which is used to either extract disabled or immobilized vehicles, or to load them onto flatbed/tilt and load type tow trucks. These may be electrically or hydraulically powered from a power take-off, and is wound with a wire cable and equipped with a hook. Snatch blocks may be used to change direction or increase the pulling power and a variety of specialized hooks may be attached to the main hook, including hooks which attach to specific parts of the car. J-hooks, which look somewhat like blunt meat hooks are used to hook around axles. Mini-J hooks can be used if there is a tow loop provided, and R and T hooks are designed to hook into slots cut by the manufacturer in the underside of the frame on many cars. Axle straps may also be used, when there are few other places to attach.

=== Off-road vehicles ===
Off-road vehicles may be equipped with recovery tools such as winches on the front and back bumpers, usually mounted to a winch bar or frame mounted metal bumper. Less commonly it is mounted on a specialised metal plate "hidden winch mount" behind the vehicle's stock bumper, this is referred to as a "hidden winch" as the hook and fairlead hides behind a flip-up front number plate, the winch itself is not visible. The snubbing winch is used to pull vehicles out of mud, snow, sand, rocks, and water, and to pull vehicles through or over obstacles. The winch is made of cable made up of a braided synthetic rope, or a steel cable wrapped around a motorized drum. Each is controlled electronically, allowing the operator to control the winch speed. Modern vehicles typically use electric winches running off the car's 12V starter or 24V secondary battery. The winch is either controlled with a detachable cable, a button inside the car or wireless remote. Older vehicles may have a PTO winch, controlled via the car's transmission, a secondary clutch maybe used so the vehicle does not need to be moving while winching. Some winches are powered by the pressure generated in the hydraulic steering system. The high lift jack or come-along is used for manual winching.

=== Aircraft use ===
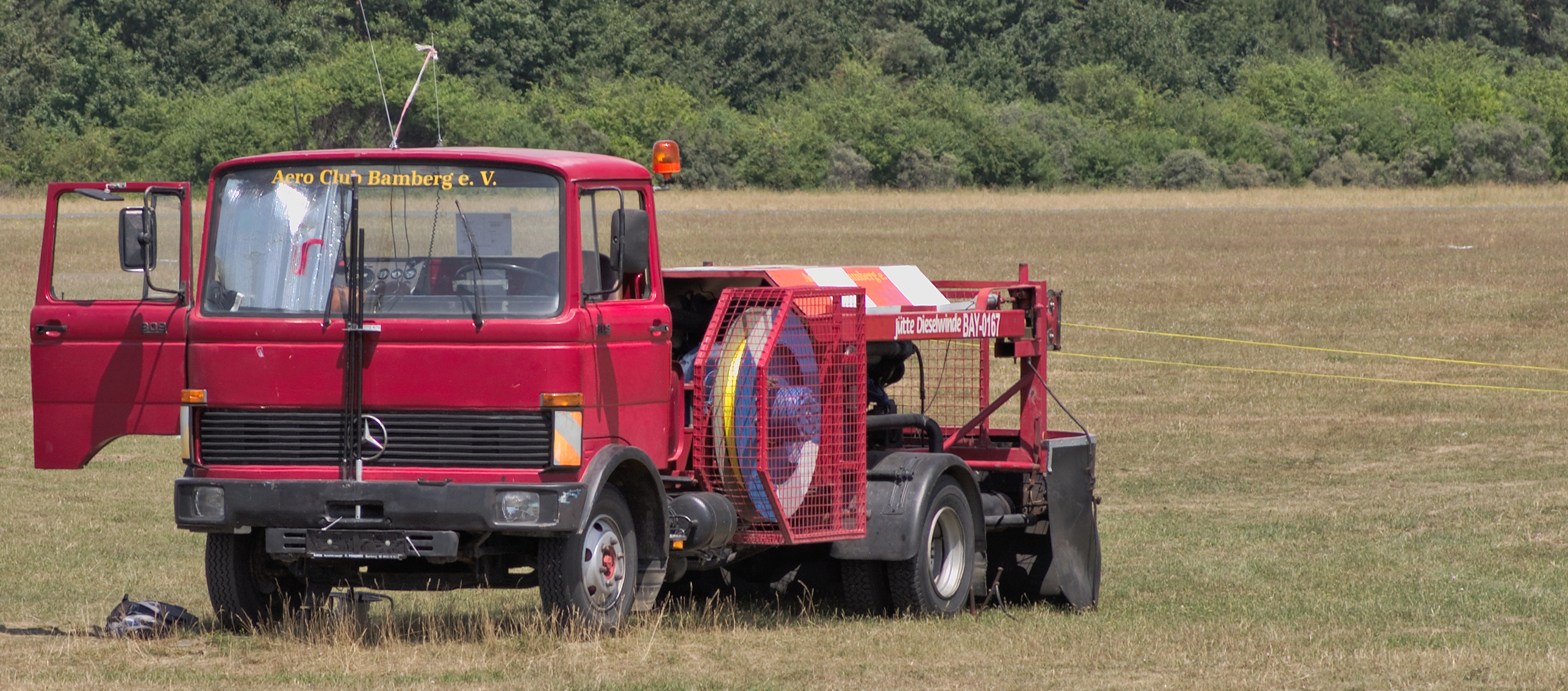
Glider winch. Winch spool can be seen on the side of the truck, while cables to the right of the image are attached to the glider(s) being launched

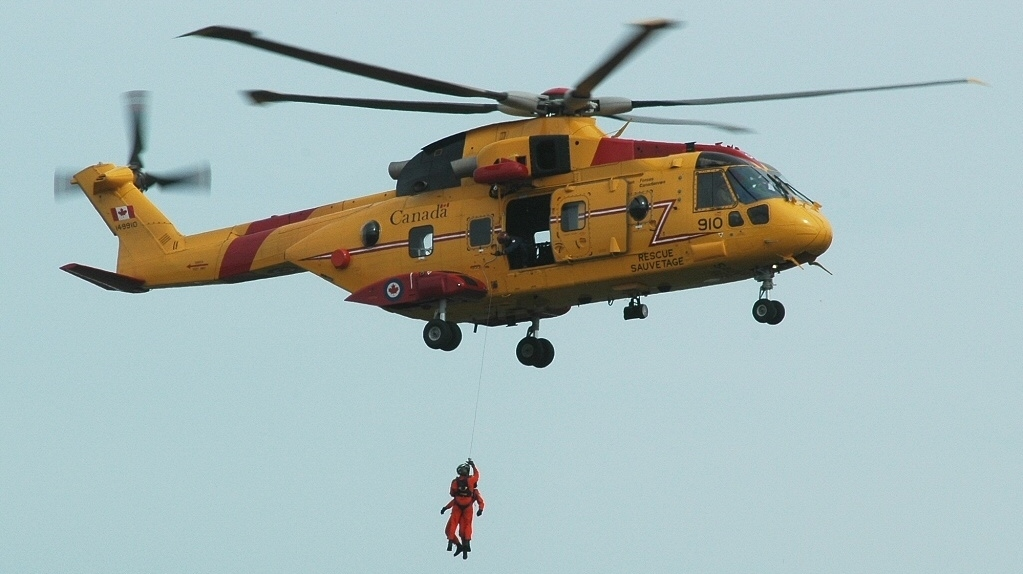
RCAF CH-149 Cormorant rescue helicopter, with rescue team on winch

Gliders are often launched using a winch mounted on a trailer or heavy vehicle. This method is widely used at many European gliding clubs, as an inexpensive alternative to aerotowing. The engine is usually a gas/petrol, LPG or diesel, though hydraulic fluid engines and electrical motors are also used. The winch pulls in 1,000 to 1,600 m (3,300 to 5,200 ft) of high-tensile steel wire or a synthetic fibre cable, attached at the other end to the glider. The cable is released at a height of about 400 to 700 m (1,300 to 2,300 ft) after a short, steep climb.

Search and Rescue helicopters are often equipped with winches to avoid having to get the helicopter dangerously close to obstacles, or into ocean troughs, allowing rescue teams to be lowered and evacuees to be extricated while the helicopter hovers overhead. Helicopter winches are also used for heli-logging and for airlifting oversized cargo, such as vehicles and other aircraft, although the winch in these cases is only used to reduce the hazards to flying with a loose cable hanging below the helicopter.

Stationary balloons, such as the barrage balloons used during the Second World War to discourage marauding aircraft, and the Kite balloons used during the First World War for artillery spotting are usually tethered with a winch, which can be used to lower the balloon, either to relocate it, or to bring it down quickly to prevent it being shot down by enemy aircraft. Larger man carrying kites often used winches to raise and lower them.

Towed gunnery targets, used to train anti-aircraft gunners, and both fighter pilots and aircraft gunners, are run out behind the target tug aircraft for practice, and winched in for take-off and landing.

Before advances were made in antennas in the 1950s, radio aerials were quite long, and needed to be winched out for use, and winched back in for landing. Failure to do so would then damage the aerial, as happened to Amelia Earhart on one of the legs of her last flight.

=== Theatre ===
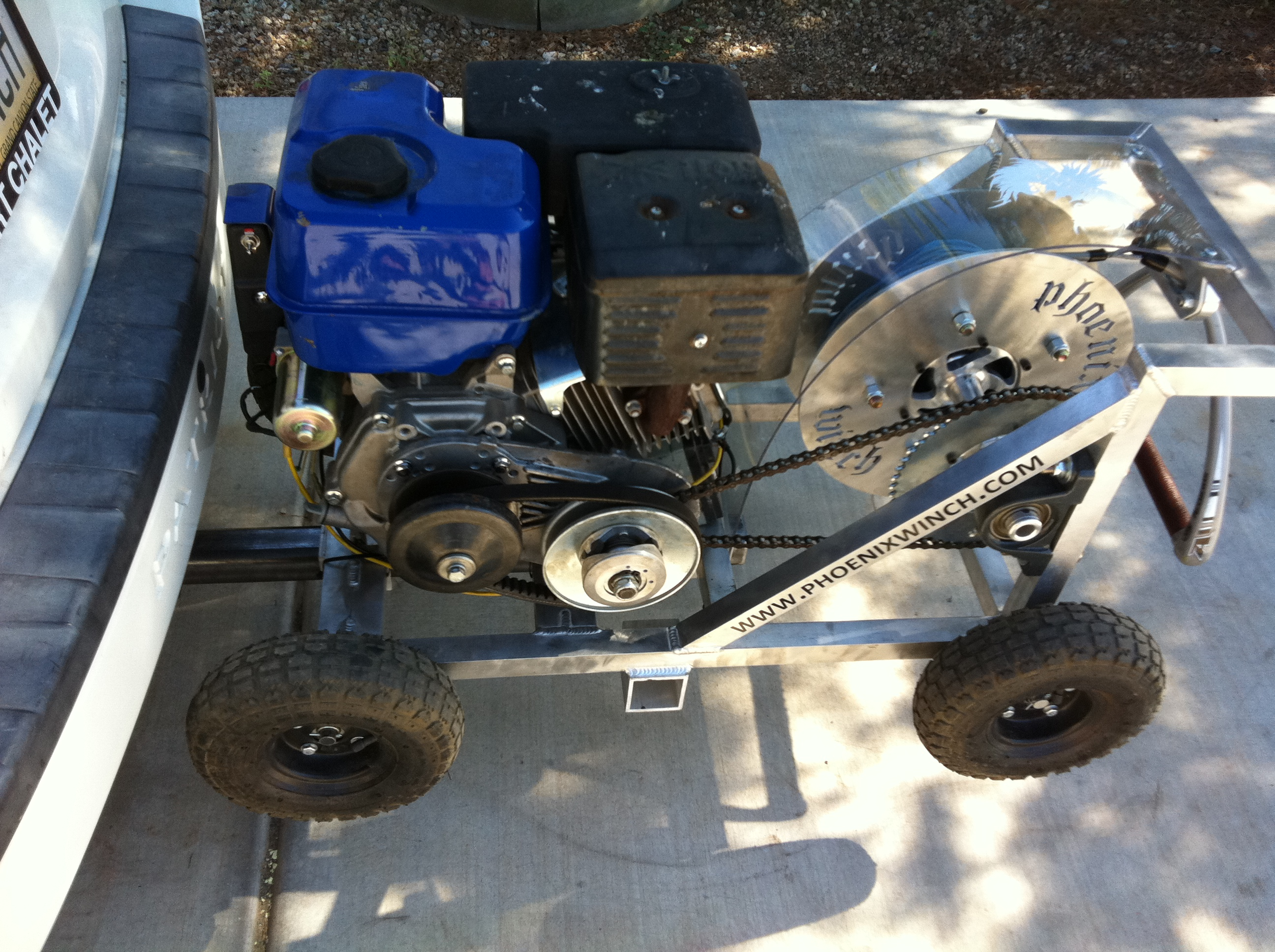
Wakeboarding winch which pulls the rider forward as the rope is wound in

Winches are frequently used as elements of backstage mechanics to move scenery in large theatrical productions. They are often embedded in the stage floor and used to move large set pieces on and off.

=== Wakeskate winch ===
Wakeskate winching is a sport where a person on a waterski or snowboard is propelled across the water with a winch. The winch consists of a gas-powered engine, spool, rope, frame, and sometimes a simple transmission. The person being towed walks (or swims) away from the winch, while extending the rope. When the winch is engaged, it pulls the boarder in at a speed ranging from 25 to 40 kilometres per hour (16 to 25 mph). The winch may be mounted to a vehicle, set into the ground by stakes, or tied to a tree. The cable may also be run through pulleys mounted offshore so that it pulls the person away from where the winch is located, and multiple pulleys may be used to multiply the force applied by a small but high revving motor instead of using a transmission.

== Winch types ==
=== Lever winch ===
Lever winches are winches that use self-gripping jaws instead of spools to move rope or wire through the winch. Powered by moving a handle back and forth, they allow one person to move objects several tons in weight.

=== Snubbing winch ===
This is a vertical spool with a ratchet mechanism similar to a conventional winch, but with no crank handle or other form of drive. The line is wrapped around the spool and can be tightened or reeled in by pulling the tail line. The winch takes the load once the pull is stopped with little operator tension needed to hold it. These also allow controlled release of the tension by the operator using the friction of the line around the ratcheted spool. They are used on small sailing boats and dinghies to control sheets and other lines, and in larger applications to supplement and relieve tension on the primary winches.

=== Air winch ===
An air winch, sometimes known as an air hoist or air tugger, is an air-powered version of a winch. It is commonly used for the lifting and the suspension of materials. In the oil and gas, construction, and maritime industries, air winches are frequently preferred to electric, diesel, and hydraulic winches because of their durability, versatility, and safety.

== See also ==
- Block and tackle
- Capstan equation
- Come-along
- Harness (disambiguation)
- Hoist (device)
- Hoist (mining)
- Parasailing
- Portsmouth Block Mills
- Pulley
- Steam donkey
- Wire rope spooling technology
