= Come-along =

Lever operated, portable ratchet winch

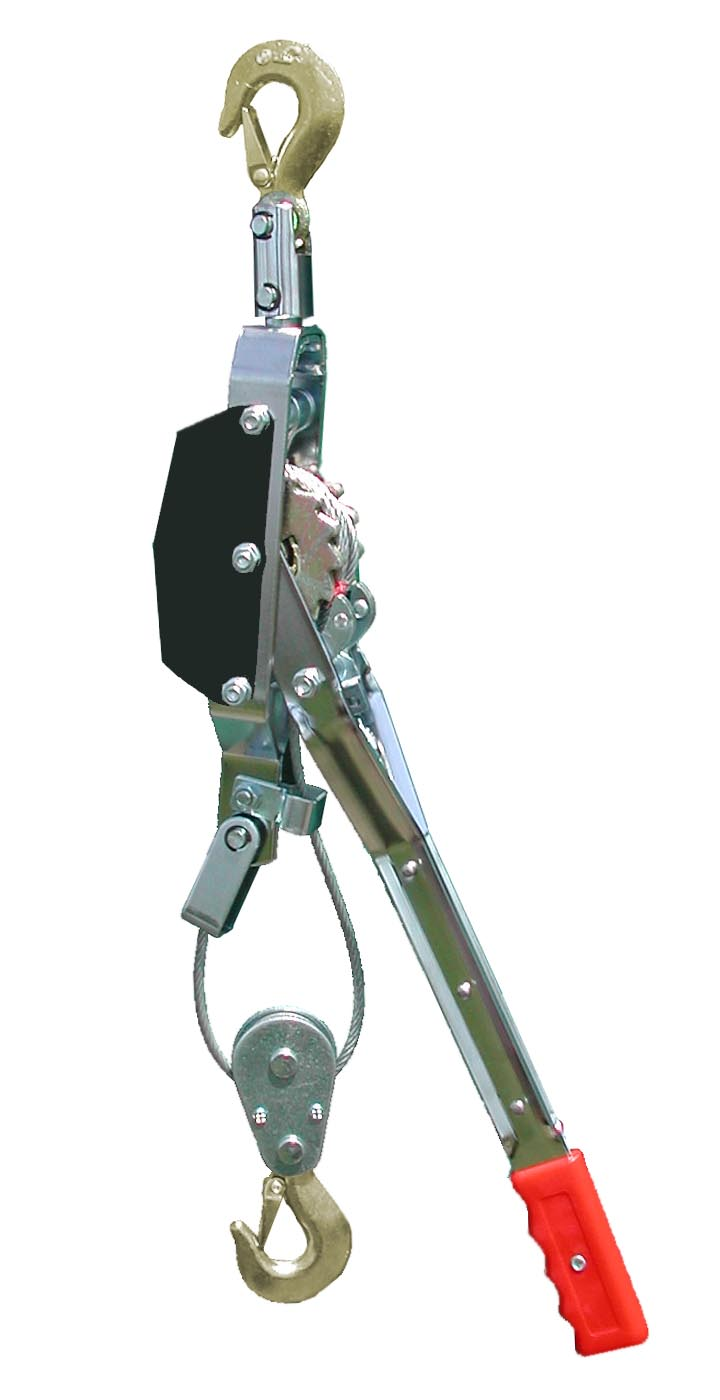
A come-along.

A come-along, also known as a power puller, is a hand-operated winch with a ratchet used to pull objects. The drum is wrapped with wire rope. A similar tool that uses a nylon strap is used to straighten trees, as it straightens gradually over time, therefore not splitting the trunk.

Come-alongs are not rated for overhead lifting, but a similar-looking device called a ratchet lever hoist is used this way.

The original tool of this type was developed by Abraham Maasdam of Deep Creek, Colorado, about 1919, and later commercialized by his son, Felber Maasdam, about 1946. It has been copied by many manufacturers in recent decades. A similar heavy-duty unit with a combination chain and cable became available in 1935 that was used by railroads, but lacked the success of the cable-only type units.

A similar tool to a come-along is a cable puller, which does not have a drum and ratchet but directly grips the cable, allowing unlimited lengths of wire rope to be used.
