= Stranded cable =

Stranded cable may refer to:

- Stranded wire
- Wire rope
