= Robinson's Disengaging Gear =

Boat launching mechanism

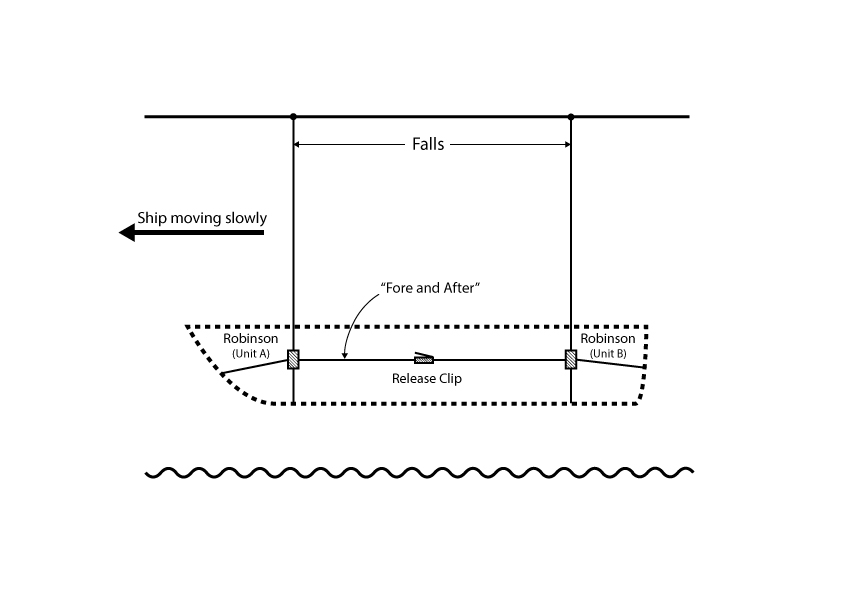
General Arrangement, not to scale

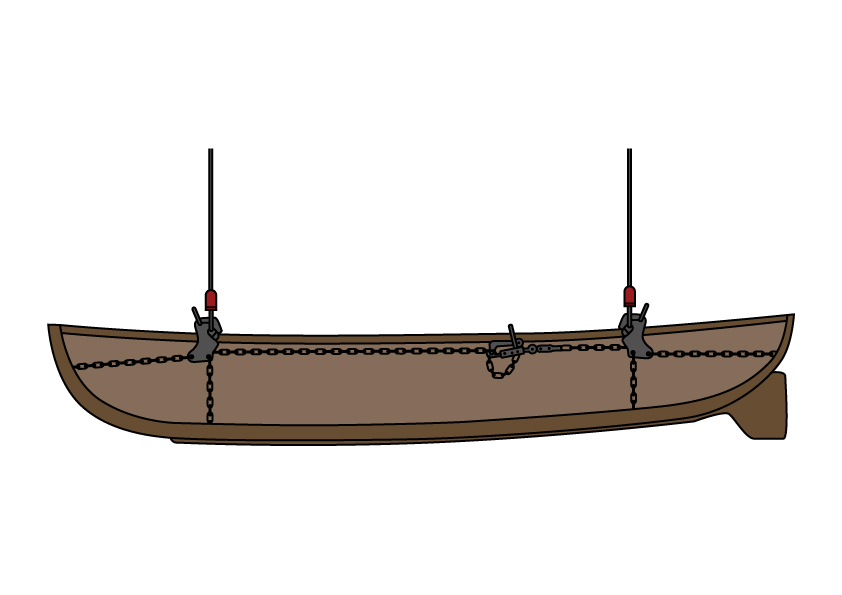
Disengaging Gear in actual position in the boat

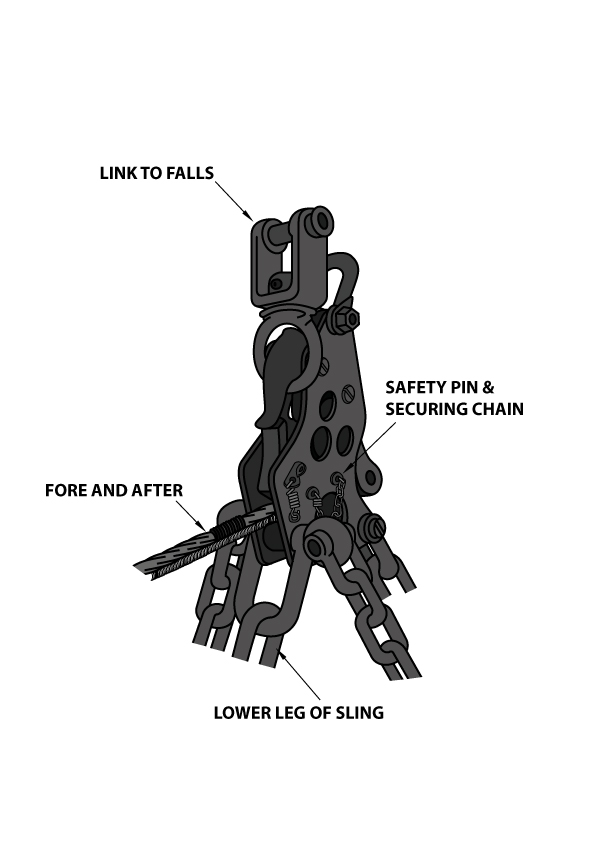
This is detail of one of the two identical Disengaging Gear units needed for a seaboat

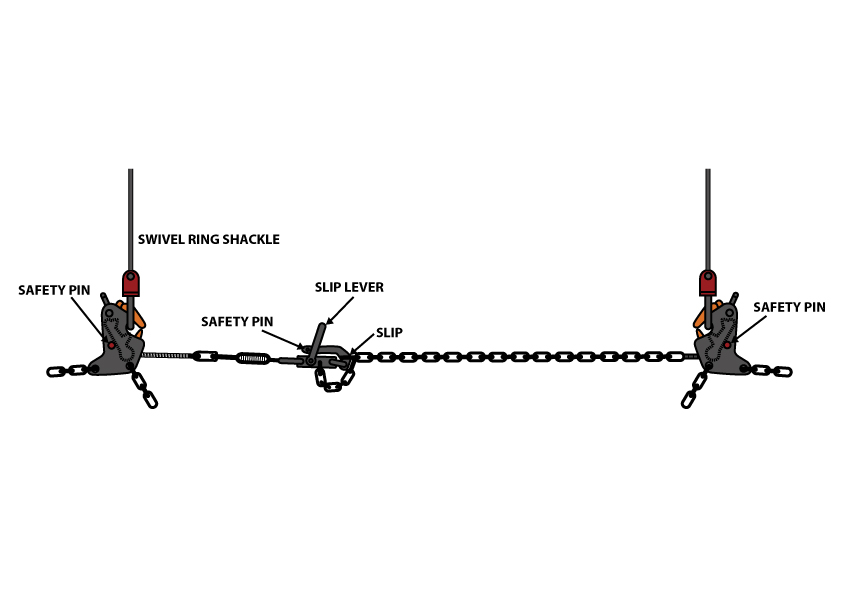
Disengaging Gear in the Safety Position

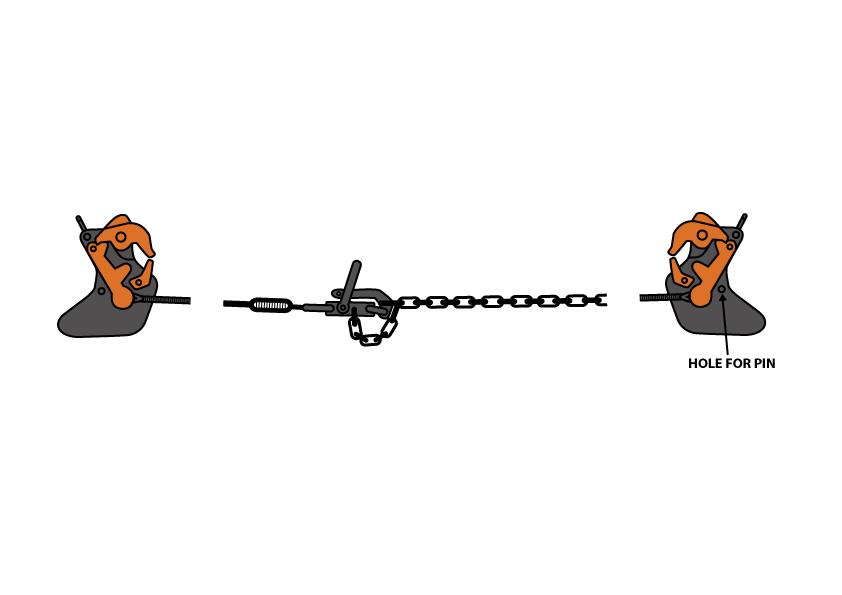
Safety Pins removed

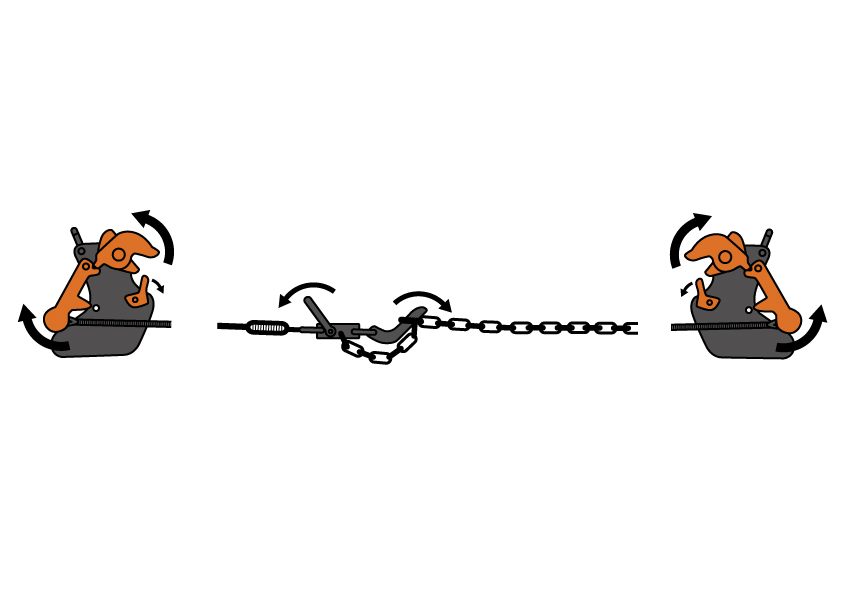
Disengaging Gear almost released

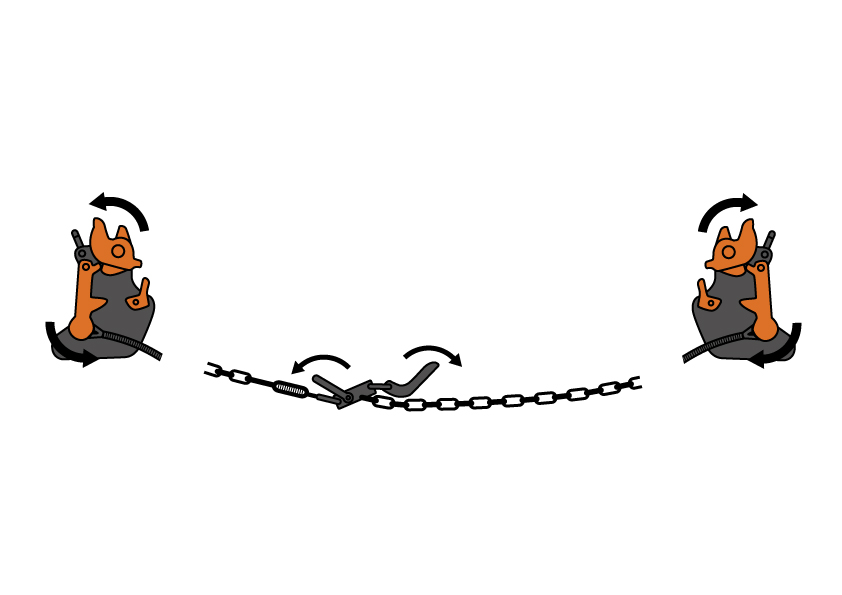
Boat Released into the water

The Robinson's Disengaging Gear is a system for safely releasing a small seaboat into the sea from a larger ship. The Robinson's Disengaging Gear has been standard equipment on British Royal Navy ships since 1880. The term seaboat is used here to describe a work boat that is used in everyday ship operations for transferring people, inspecting other vessels, etc. A seaboat is different from a lifeboat, which is only used in an emergency to save lives. Historically, a sea boat was also used as a lifeboat, but the modern day lifeboats are usually specialized boats, not used for everyday work.

== Need for an effective disengaging gear ==
Especially in navy ships, the seaboat is often launched while the ship is moving slowly. The ship may be moving for operational reasons, or because of the need to maintain steerage way (forward motion of water past the rudder to enable steering). Releasing the seaboat is a risky procedure, and in the 1880s, accidents raised the demand for a better system.

== Launch process ==
Traditionally, a seaboat is suspended from the ship by two falls (ropes), one at the bow (front) of the seaboat, and the other at the stern (back) of the seaboat. The two suspending falls may be multi-part pulley systems, or motor-driven wire ropes. The objective is that when the boat is lowered down and positioned close to the water, both ends of the boat be released simultaneously. Failure to release both ends simultaneously will likely result in the boat being tipped into the sea. Without a specialized mechanism, the release of each end of the boat was a manual action requiring the coordination of two groups of sailors. Even a momentary mistiming could be tragic, especially if the ship was moving.

== Problem solution ==
Several solutions that would mechanically simultaneously release both falls were proposed. The British Royal Navy adopted and standardized on the Robinson's Disengaging Gear in 1881, and this system was still in use in the late 20th century. The Robinson's Disengaging Gear consists of three mechanisms. There are two disengaging hooks, one at each end of the seaboat, holding the boat to the falls. The two disengaging hooks are connected by a relatively tight and thin wire rope to the disengaging release clip located approximately at the center of the seaboat. The thin connecting wire rope is called the "Fore and After". The disengaging hooks are normally held safe from unintentionally dropping the seaboat by a pin in each disengaging hook.

In the Royal Navy, as ship's crew starts to lower the boat, the order "Out Pins" is given. The boat's crew pushes down on the fore and after wire, to relieve pressure on the pins, and the pins are removed.

The boat's skipper is usually positioned in the stern of the seaboat as it is lowered, in order to be ready to steer the seaboat away from the ship's side. When the seaboat is close to the water as judged by the seaboat's skipper, the skipper gives the command to "Slip", and a crew member releases a lever on the disengaging clip, which slackens the fore and after. The slack in the fore and after allows the disengaging hooks to release the falls simultaneously, and the seaboat drops safely and level the final few inches into the water.

== Description ==
A good description of the Robinsons Disengaging Gear, and the launch procedure is given in the British Manual of Seamanship.

== Inventor ==
The Disengaging Gear was invented by Mark Heaton Robinson (1844-1923) who was a prolific inventor, and who is perhaps best known for his developments in the area of single-acting high-speed steam engines.

== Obsolescence ==
Robinson's Disengaging Gear was used in the Royal Navy through the 1970s in the Type 12 frigates, the Leander class frigates, and the County class guided missile destroyers. The standard seaboat was a 26-foot "3 in 1" whaler with an inboard diesel engine, and a crew of 6. After that time the Royal Navy wanted to reduce the overall crew size on ships, and so switched to smaller seaboats, launched from a single wire crane. The new single wire system was released with the new Henriksen Hook. The Henriksen Hook releases the boat automatically when the boat touches the water, and the boat weight on the suspension line is relieved. The Hendrikson Hook is now standard on Royal Navy ships (2015).
