= Eye splice =

Method of creating a loop in the end of a rope

- Names: Eye splice, sailmaker's eye splice
- ABoK: #17, #2745, #2754
- Instructions

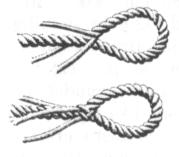
Eye splices from Carl Smith's 1899 Båtseglareordbok

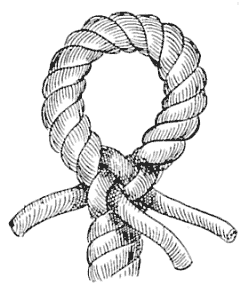
Eye splice from Alpheus Hyatt Verrill's 1917 Knots, Splices and Rope Work

The eye splice is a method of creating a permanent loop (an "eye") in the end of a rope by means of rope splicing.

The Flemish eye is a type of circular loop at the end of a thread. There are several techniques of creating the eye with its knot tied back to the line, rope or wire.

== Techniques ==
There are various splicing techniques, and relate to whether a rope is braided or plaited, whether it has a core and whether the core is made of high-performance fibers. Techniques include:

- Eye splice in three-strand rope
- Eye splice in eight-strand rope
- Eye splice in single braided (hollow braid) rope
- Eye splice in double braided rope with polyester or nylon fiber core
- Eye splice in rope with braided cover and a laid core
- Eyes splice in rope with braided cover and parallel fibers in the core
- Eye splice in double braided rope with a high-performance fiber core (e.g. Dyneema, Vectran)

=== In three-strand rope ===
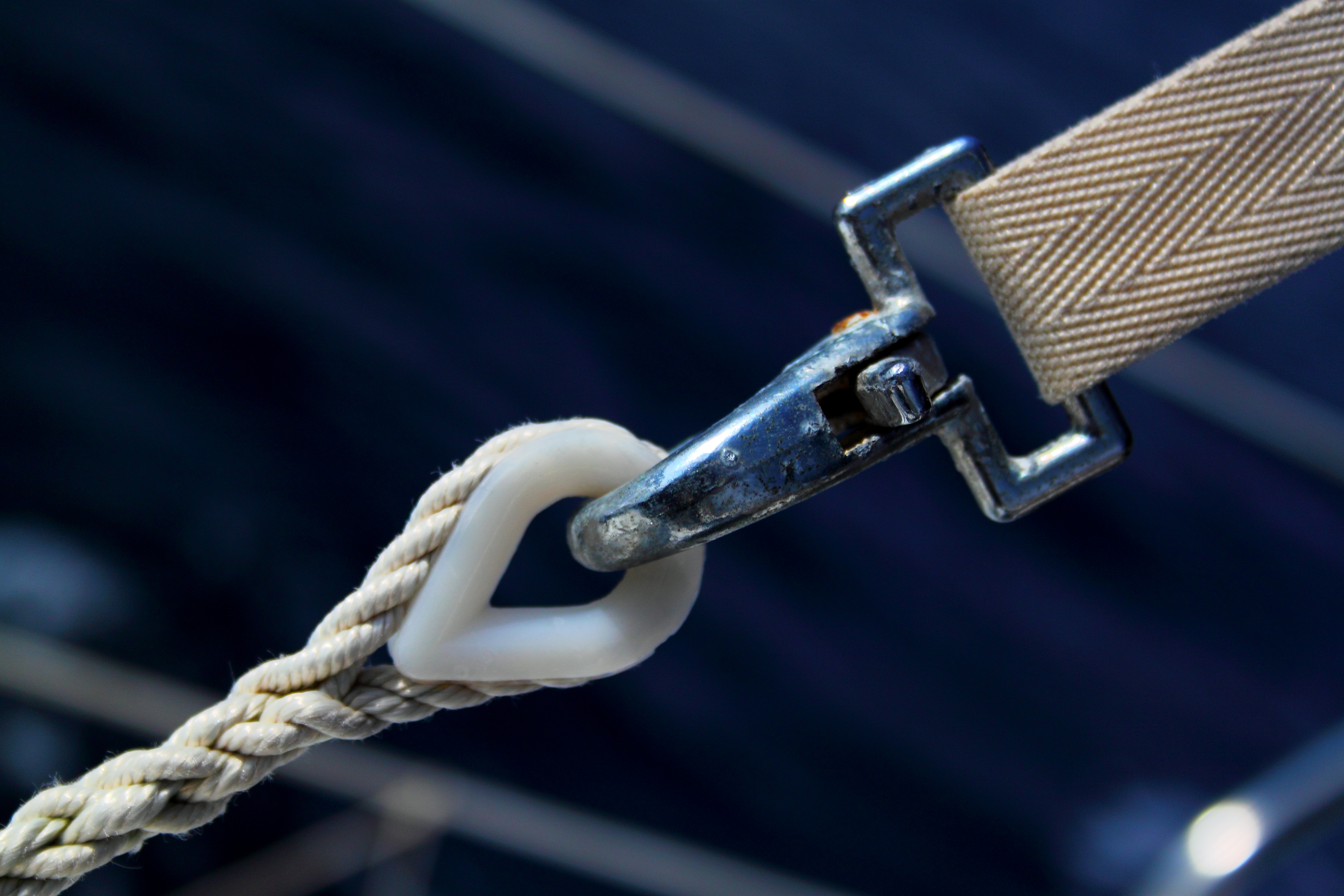
Eye splice with plastic teardrop thimble

For conventional stranded ropes, the ends of the rope are tucked (plaited) back into the standing end to form the loop. Three tucks are the minimum for natural fibers, five tucks are necessary for synthetics. Variations of this more traditional eye splice include:

- Round eyesplice used with round thimbles
- Lever's eyesplice (a.k.a. pro eyesplice) used with teardrop thimbles
- Liverpool eyesplice commonly used on wire rope

The ends of the rope are first wrapped in tape or heated with a flame to prevent each end from fraying completely. The rope is untwisted for a distance equal to three times the diameter for each "tuck", e.g., for five tucks in half inch rope, undo about 7.5 inches. Wrap the rope at that point to prevent it unwinding further. Form the loop and plait the three ends back against the twist of the rope. Practice is required to keep each end to retain its twist and lie neatly. In stiff old rope or in new rope which has been tightly wound, a marlinspike or fid can facilitate opening up the strands and threading each end.

In some cases, the splice is tapered by trimming the working strands after each tuck. Also, the splice can be whipped to protect and strengthen the splice. A rope thimble can be inserted in the eye to prevent chafing if the eye is to be permanently attached to a fixture (used when attaching a rope to a chain, for example).

=== In eight-strand rope ===
An eight-strand rope consists of two left-twisting and two right-twisting pairs. Make sure the left-twisting strands are fed below left-twisting strands, and right-twisting strands below the right-twisting ones. Work systematically with different tape colours to keep from getting lost in the mess of strands. An eight-strand square plaited rope can be used as mooring line or anchor rode.

=== In single braided rope ===
This technique is mostly used for Dyneema ropes. The principle of a Dyneema eye is a core-to-core splice, in which a length of at least 60 times the diameter of the rope is taken back into itself. DSM advises using 60 times the diameter for coated Dyneema, and 100 times the diameter for uncoated Dyneema. For 6mm coated rope, this would mean 36 cm. Under tension the rope will pull into itself tightly, which produces a strong eye. One can pull out the eye when the rope is not under tension, unless one makes a lock-splice (also called brummel splice) or the eye is stitched.

=== In double braided rope with polyester or nylon fiber core ===
In ropes with a polyester (or nylon) core, both the core and the cover are needed for strength.

=== In rope with braided cover and a laid core ===
Splicing a rope with a laid core is usually more complicated than double braided polyester ropes. One needs more force to take the rope back into itself because there is often less room between the core and the cover.

=== In rope with braided cover and parallel fibers in the core ===
A rope with parallel fibers in the core often has a tight inner cover to keep the fibers together. This splice is similar to the one for double braided polyester ropes; the main difference is that one cannot take the cover back in to the core because the fibers go through the core.

Instructions are published in Splicing Modern Ropes (a practical handbook)

=== In double braided rope with high-performance fiber core ===
For ropes with a core of high-performance fibers (such as aramid fibers or Dyneema or Vectran) only the core determines the strength. The cover can be used optionally in the eye splice, for example, to add UV protection (for aramid fibers, such as Kevlar). Dyneema is very UV resistant and the cover is not needed. For these ropes, one could make an eye splice in the single braided core and leave the cover unused. There are ropes with an extra double layer cover; this is basically the same splice as for double braided except that the inner cover first needs to be removed over the length of the splice.

== Splicing tools ==
Depending on the type of splice and rope, there is a variety of tools available, such as hollow fids, pulling needles and traditional splicing fids. A marker, splicing tape, measuring tape and a knife or scissors are often used in splicing. Often a hammer and winch are used as well for tougher splices.

== Advantages ==
The eye splice has several advantages. The most notable is the permanence of the loop. An equally important advantage is the lack of stress it puts on the rope. Splices average 25-40% of rope strength decay, which is low compared to even the strongest knots. Literature and reference sources typically attribute only a 5% strength decay for a properly tied splice. Technically, a perfectly tied splice retains 100% of the original strength of the rope but in practice this is rarely the case. Destructive testing of rope in manufacturing facilities makes use of a professional and spliced eyes for connecting the rope to the testing apparatus.

== Alternatives ==
The bowline is a quick, practical method of forming a loop in the end of a piece of rope. However, the bowline has an awkward tendency to shake undone when not loaded. The bowline also reduces the strength of the rope at the knot to ~63% of the original unknotted strength.

== See also ==
- List of knots
- Swaged sleeve
- Wall and crown knot
