= Swaged sleeve =

Connector crimped to grip the inserted component

A swaged sleeve is a connector that gets crimped using a hand tool and die (swaged). This type of compressed sleeve is commonly used to make mechanical or conductive connections. These sleeves join or terminate wire rope, aircraft cable, synthetic cable, fibrous rope, or electrical conductor cables.

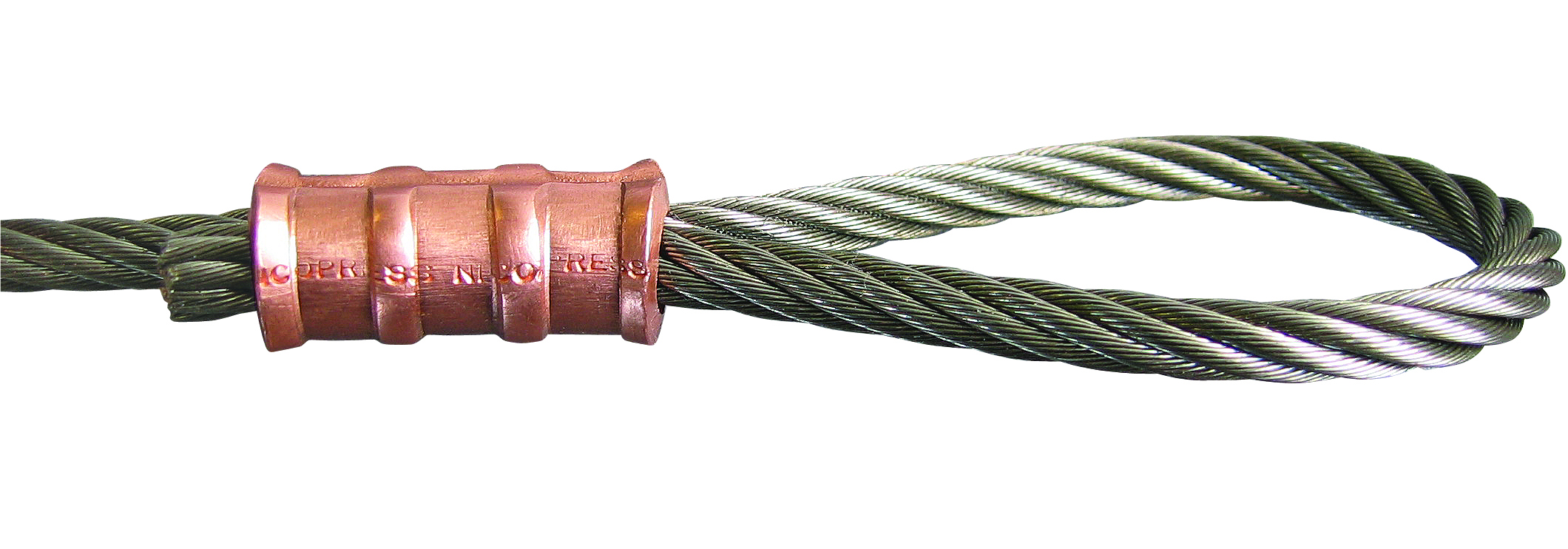
Oval swaged sleeve

== Oval swaged sleeve ==
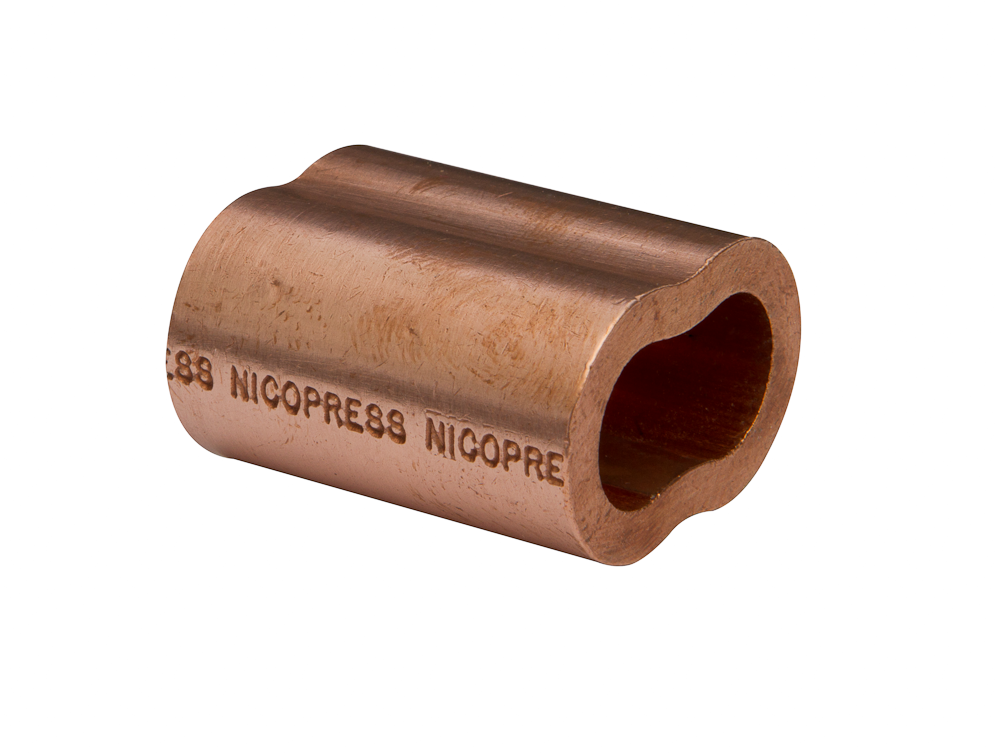
Copper oval sleeve

When properly applied to 7×7, 7×19 or 6×19 IWRC classification wire rope, the eye-splice configuration termination provides a secured connection equal to the breaking strength of the wire rope. The product was originally developed for the US Military, patented in 1942 and currently used in a wide range of applications and industries including: aerospace, defense, marine, material handling, and structural applications.

- The product which is used to make an eye splice is known as: Oval Sleeve, Figure 8 Sleeve, Hourglass Sleeve, Duplex Sleeve, Ferrule and Nicos.
- Correct installation is critical to the performance of the product; this includes utilizing the correct tool groove and/or die, number of presses/bites, press sequence and gauging. Adhering to the manufacturer's instructions will avoid catastrophic failure.

== Stop sleeve ==
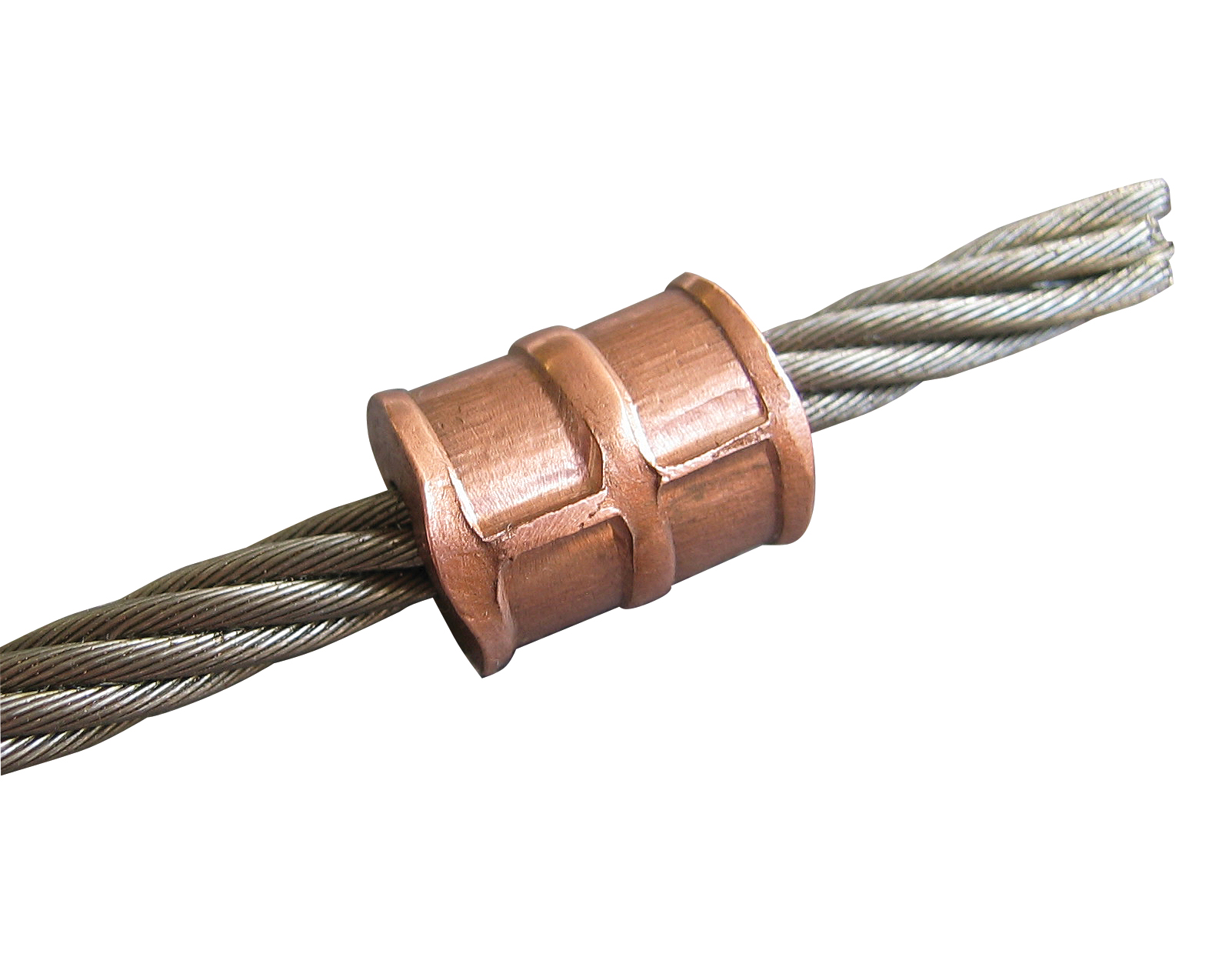
Swaged stop sleeve

The round stop sleeve is intended to be pressed on single wire or synthetic ropes, e.g. for use as an end stop.

== Splicing sleeve ==
Electrical conductor splicing sleeves are designed to splice a range of conductors. Full tension sleeves are made of high conductivity copper, aluminum or steel with a specially bonded inner bore coating

== Tools ==
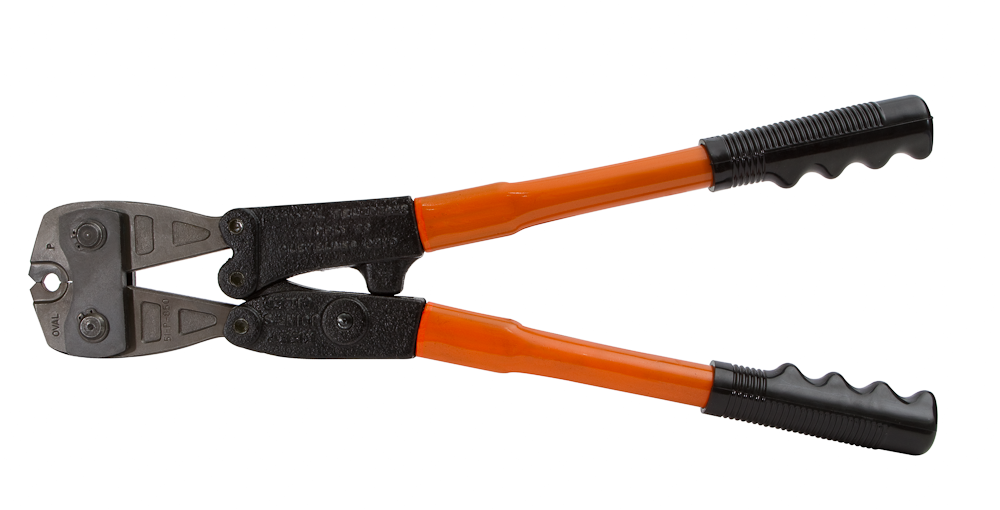
Toggle-action swaging tool

A range of swaging tools are available to compress sleeves correctly. Tools range from manual pliers type and toggle-action to pneumatic, hydraulic and battery-operated hydraulic tools.
