= Muqiao station =

Metro station in Changsha, China

Muqiao station 木桥站
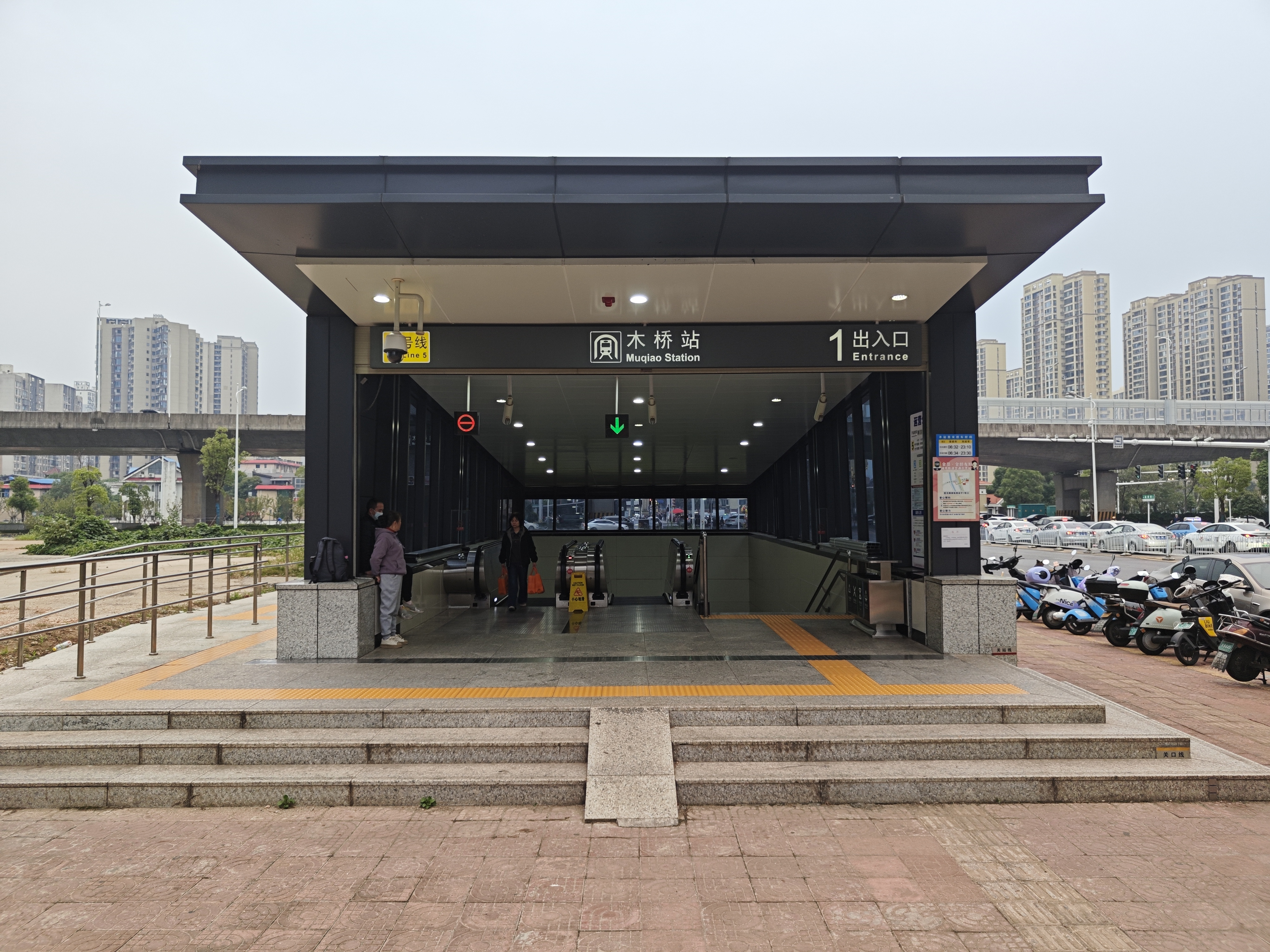
- Entrance 1

General information
- Location: Yuhua District, Changsha, Hunan; China
- Coordinates: 28°09′18″N 113°02′15″E
- Operated by: Changsha Metro
- Line(s): Line 5
- Platforms: 2 (1 island platform)

History
- Opened: 28 June 2020

Services
Preceding station	Changsha Metro	Following station
Yuhua District Government towards Maozhutang	Line 5	Guitang towards Shuiduhe

Muqiao station (Chinese: 木桥站; pinyin: Mùqiáo Zhàn) is a subway station in Yuhua District, Changsha, Hunan, China, operated by the Changsha subway operator Changsha Metro. The station officially opened for revenue service on 28 June 2020.

== History ==
The station started the test operation on 30 December 2019 and the station opened on 28 June 2020.

== Surrounding area ==
- Hunan Sports Vocational College
- Changsha District Vocational Technical College
- Shawan Park
