= Bantangchong station =

Subway station in Changsha, Hunan, China

Bantangchong station 板塘冲站
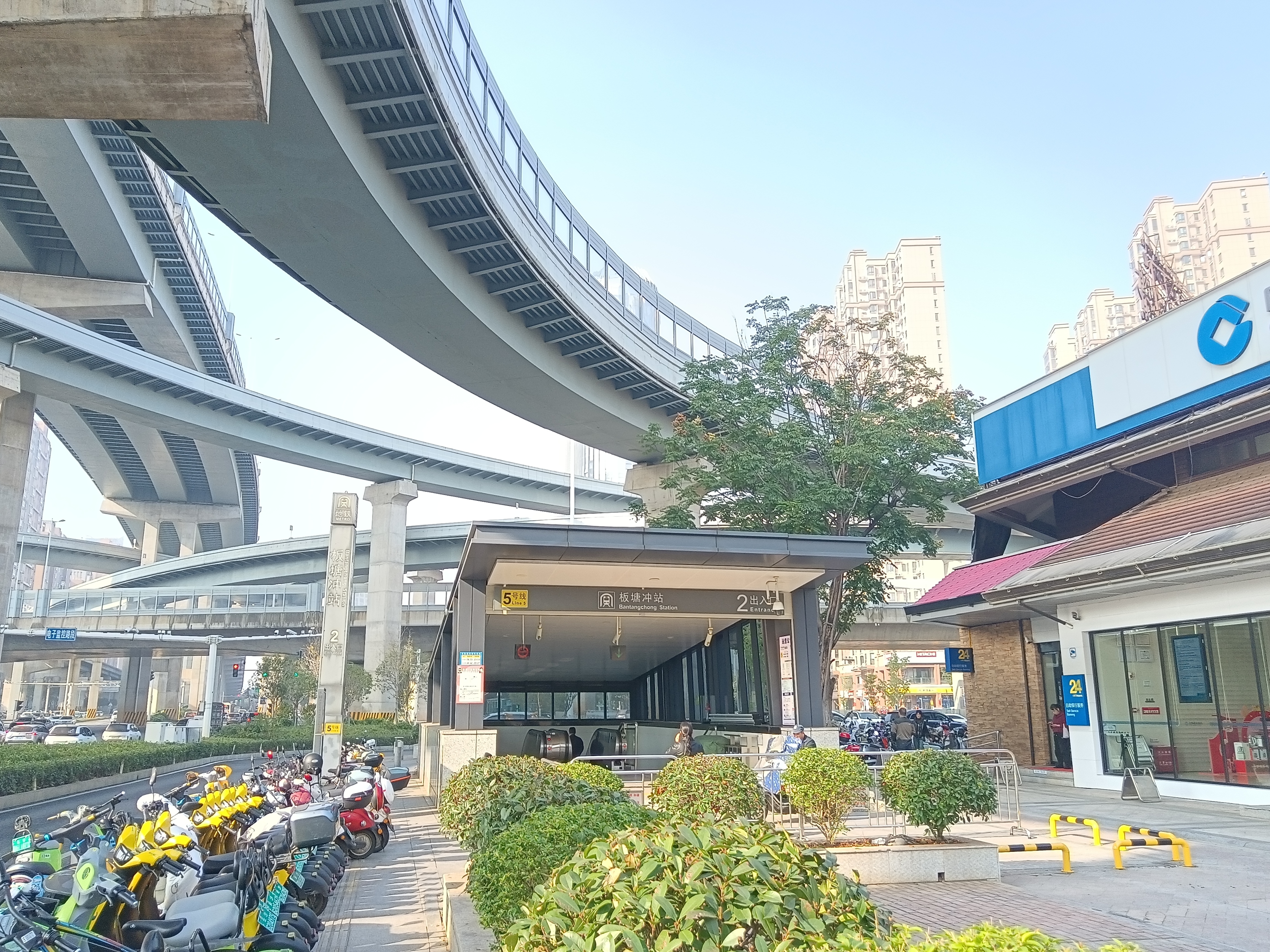
- Entrance 2

General information
- Location: Yuhua District, Changsha, Hunan; China
- Coordinates: 28°07′21″N 113°02′45″E
- Operated by: Changsha Metro
- Line: Line 5
- Platforms: 2 (1 island platform)

History
- Opened: 28 June 2020

Services
Preceding station	Changsha Metro	Following station
Maozhutang Terminus	Line 5	Datang towards Shuiduhe
Location

Bantangchong station (Chinese: 板塘冲站; pinyin: Bǎntángchōng Zhàn) is a subway station in Yuhua District, Changsha, Hunan, China, operated by the Changsha subway operator Changsha Metro. It opened to the public on June 28, 2020.

== Surrounding area ==
- Hunan Forest Botanical Garden
