= South Gaoqiao station =

Metro station in Changsha, China

South Gaoqiao station 高桥南站
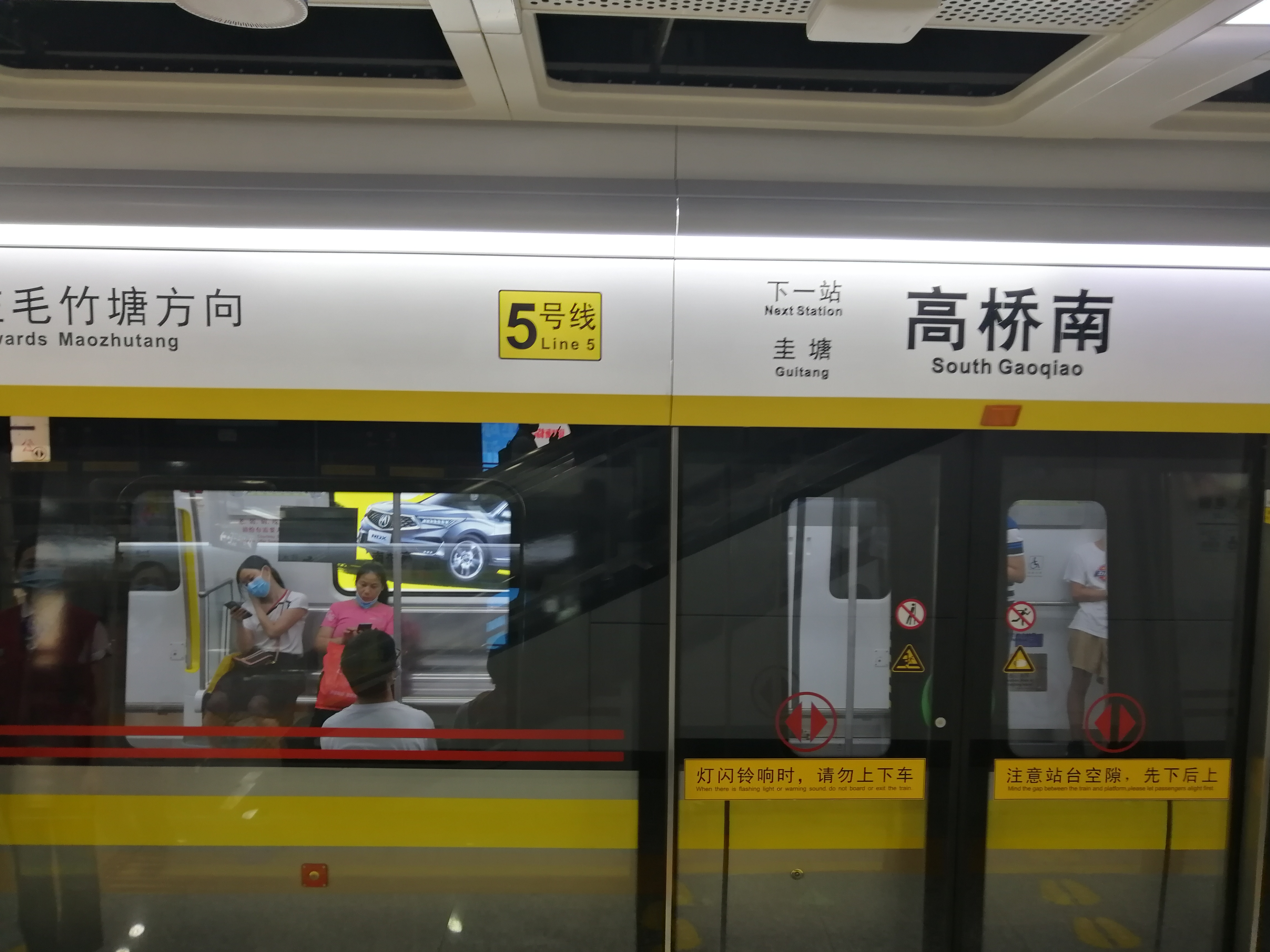

General information
- Location: Yuhua District, Changsha, Hunan; China
- Coordinates: 28°10′24″N 113°02′10″E
- Operated by: Changsha Metro
- Line(s): Line 5
- Platforms: 2 (1 island platform)

History
- Opened: 28 June 2020

Services
Preceding station	Changsha Metro	Following station
Guitang towards Maozhutang	Line 5	North Gaoqiao towards Shuiduhe

South Gaoqiao station (Chinese: 高桥南站; pinyin: Gāoqiáo Nánzhàn) is a subway station in Yuhua District, Changsha, Hunan, China, operated by the Changsha subway operator Changsha Metro. It entered revenue service on 28 June 2020.

== History ==
The station started the test operation on 30 December 2019. The station opened on 28 June 2020.

== Surrounding area ==
- Gaoqiao Market
