= Guitang station =

Changsha Metro station

Guitang station 圭塘站
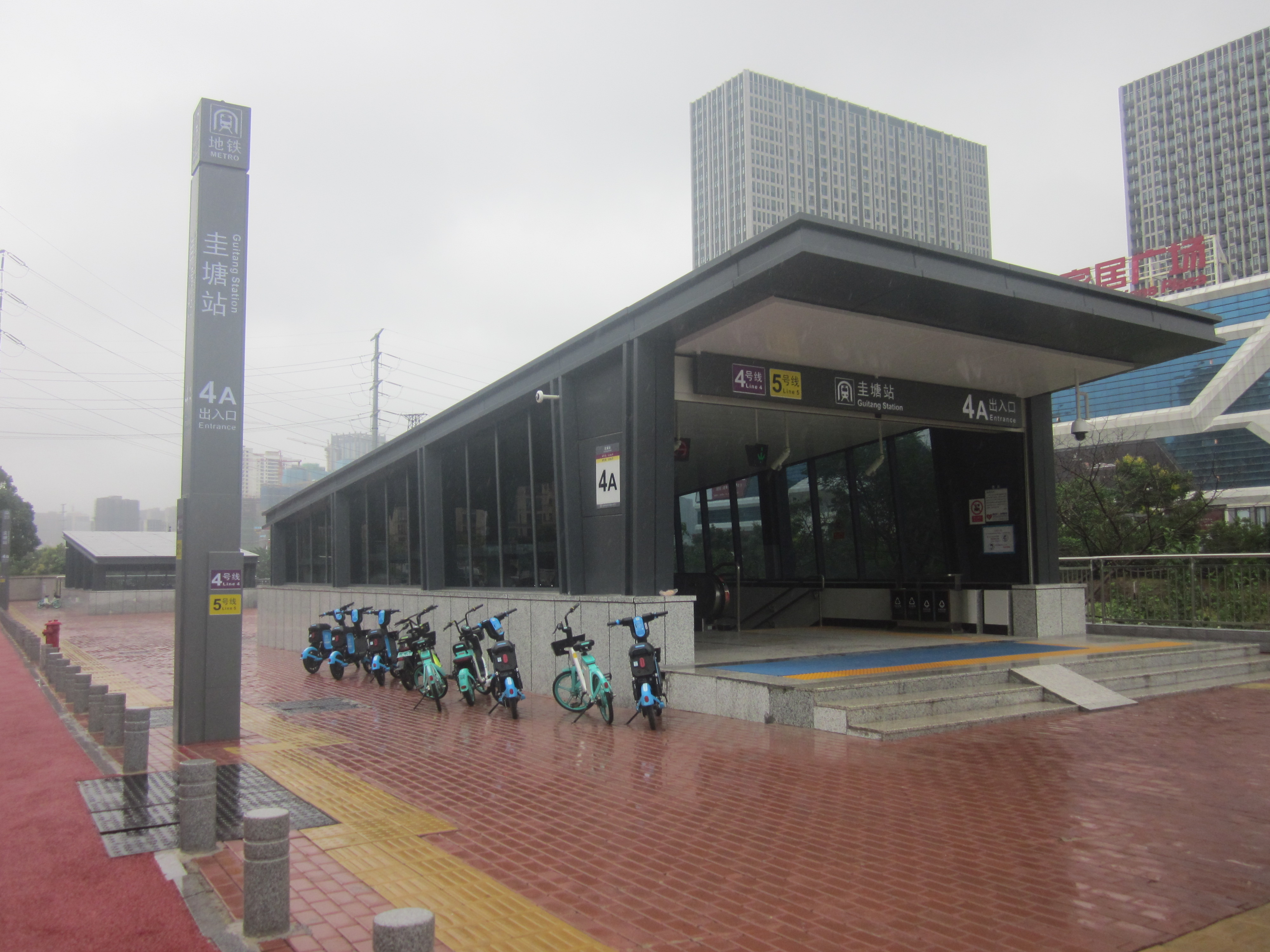
- Entrance 4A

General information
- Location: Yuhua District, Changsha, Hunan; China
- Coordinates: 28°09′49″N 113°02′13″E
- Operated by: Changsha Metro
- Line(s): Line 4 Line 5
- Platforms: 4 (2 island platforms)

History
- Opened: 26 May 2019

Services
Preceding station	Changsha Metro	Following station
Shumuling towards Guanziling	Line 4	Shawan Park towards Dujiaping
Muqiao towards Maozhutang	Line 5	South Gaoqiao towards Shuiduhe
Location

Guitang station (Chinese: 圭塘站; pinyin: Guītáng Zhàn) is a subway station in Changsha, Hunan, China, operated by the Changsha subway operator Changsha Metro.

== Station layout ==
The station has two island platforms.

== History ==
The station opened on 26 May 2019.

== Surrounding area ==
- Hunan Guangyi Experimental Middle School (湖南广益实验中学)
- Changsha Mass Art Museum (长沙群众艺术馆)
- Changsha Experimental Theatre (长沙实验剧场)
- Shazitang Jilian School (砂子塘吉联小学)
