= Yuhua District Government station =

Metro station in Changsha, China

Yuhua District Government station 雨花区政府站
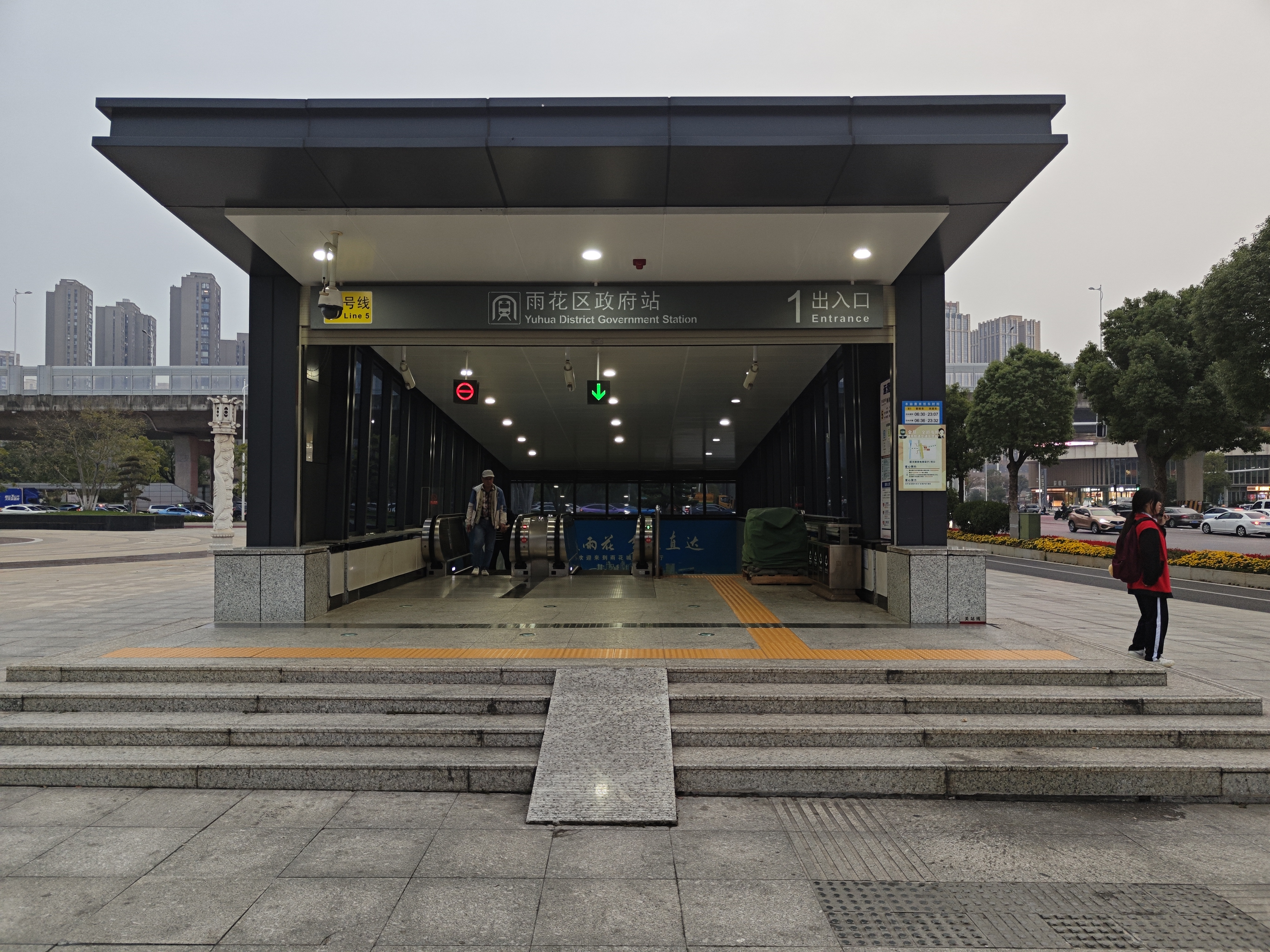
- Entrance 1

General information
- Location: Yuhua District, Changsha, Hunan; China
- Coordinates: 28°08′38″N 113°02′30″E
- Operated by: Changsha Metro
- Line(s): Line 5
- Platforms: 2 (1 island platform)

History
- Opened: 28 June 2020

Services
Preceding station	Changsha Metro	Following station
Datang towards Maozhutang	Line 5	Muqiao towards Shuiduhe

Yuhua District Government station (Chinese: 雨花区政府站; pinyin: Yǔhuāqū Zhèngfǔ Zhàn) is a subway station in Yuhua District, Changsha, Hunan, China, operated by the Changsha subway operator Changsha Metro. It entered revenue service on 28 June 2020.

== History ==
The station started the test operation on 30 December 2019. The station opened on 28 June 2020.

== Surrounding area ==
- Yuhua District Government
- Guitang River Ecological park
