= Yazipu station =

Metro station in Changsha, China

Yazipu station 鸭子铺站
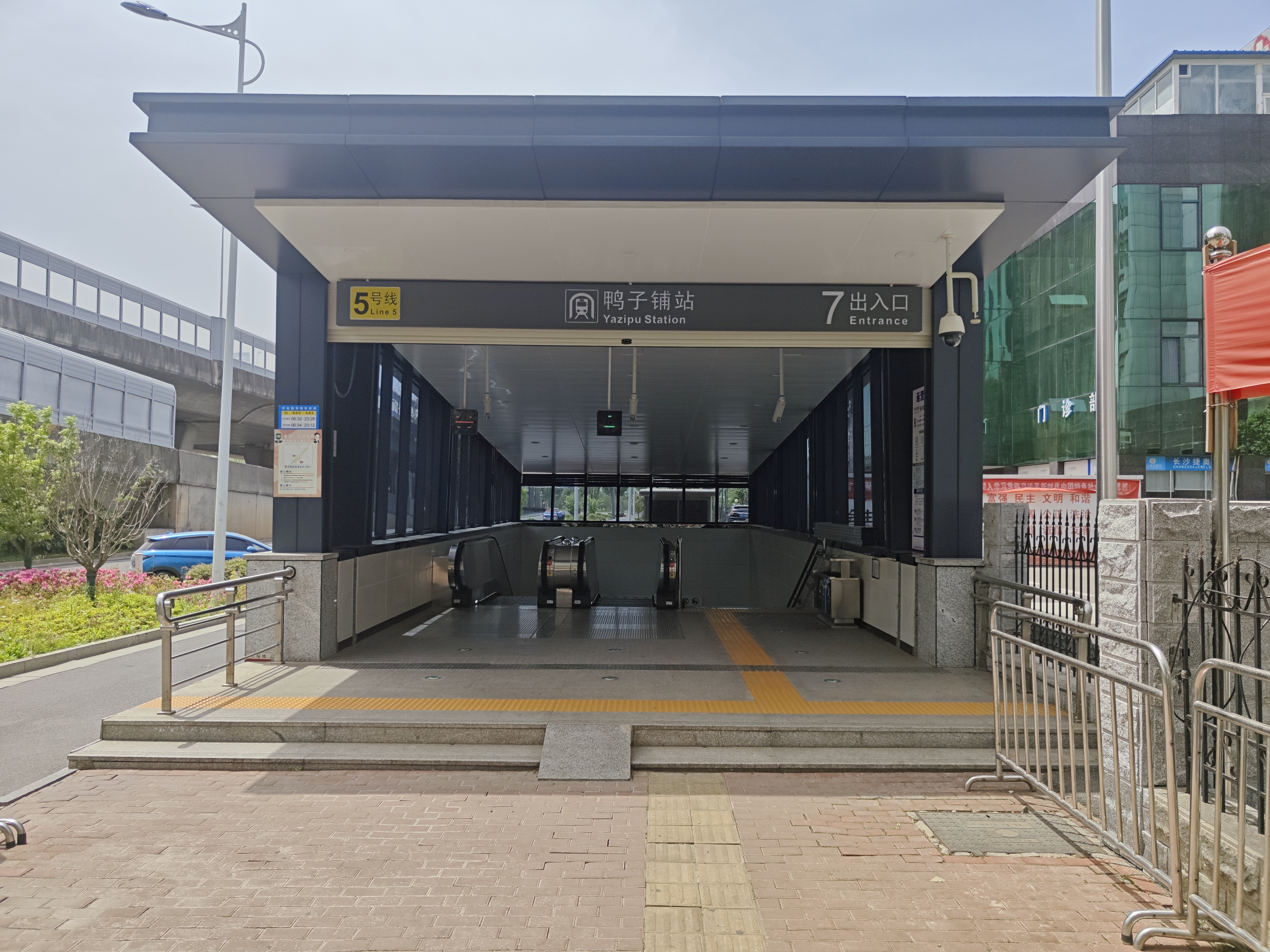
- Entrance 7

General information
- Location: Kaifu District, Changsha, Hunan; China
- Coordinates: 28°13′52″N 113°02′33″E
- Operated by: Changsha Metro
- Line: Line 5
- Platforms: 2 (1 island platform)

History
- Opened: 28 June 2020

Services
Preceding station	Changsha Metro	Following station
Huojucun towards Maozhutang	Line 5	Malanshan towards Shuiduhe
Location

Yazipu station (Chinese: 鸭子铺站; pinyin: Yāzǐpù Zhàn) is a subway station in Kaifu District, Changsha, Hunan, China, operated by the Changsha subway operator Changsha Metro. It entered revenue service on 28 June 2020.

== History ==
The station started the test operation on 30 December 2019. The station opened on 28 June 2020.

== Surrounding area ==
- Hunan Blood Center
- Changsha Public Health Center
