= Malanshan station =

Metro station in Changsha, China

Malanshan station 马栏山站
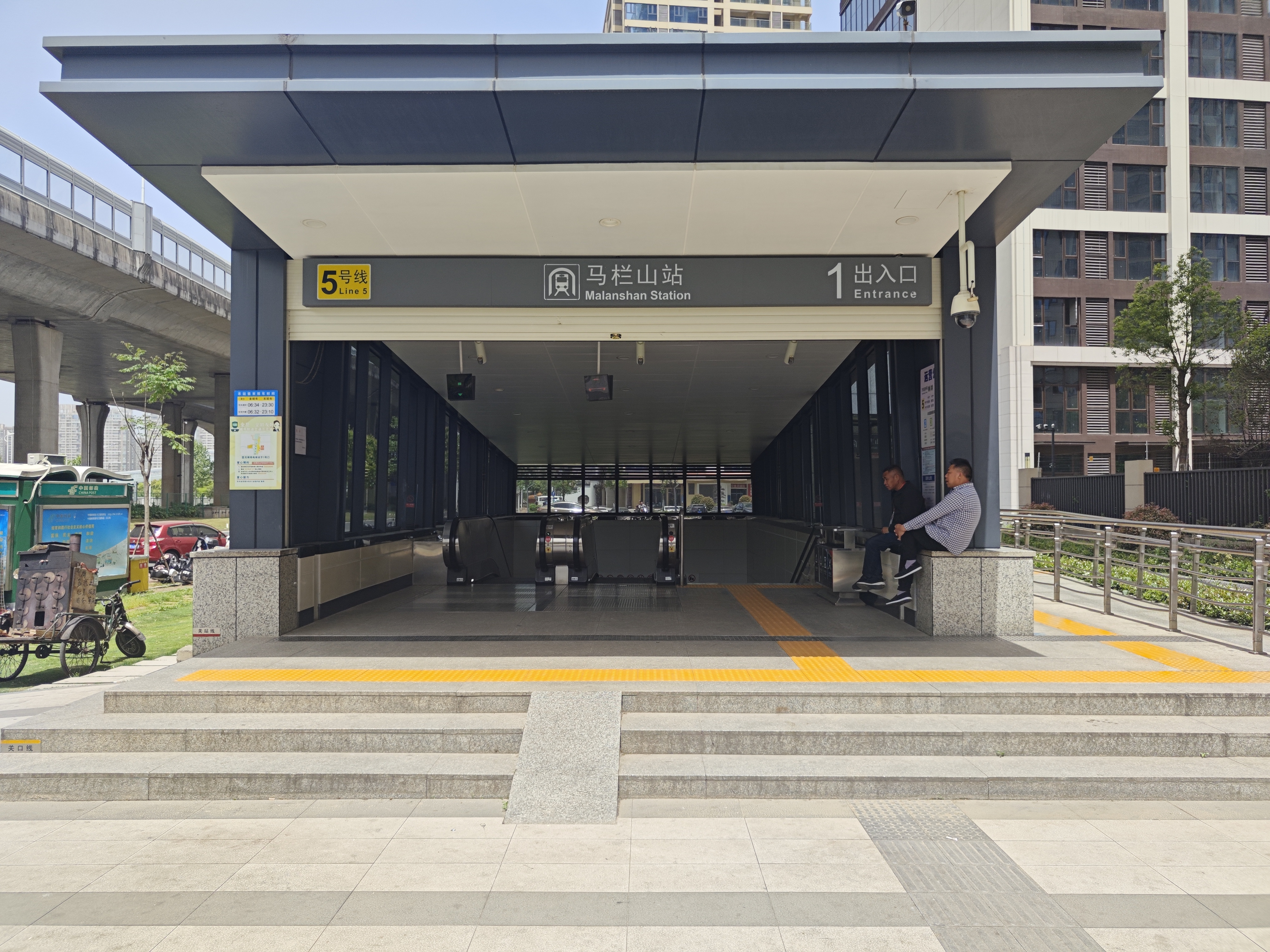
- Entrance 1

General information
- Location: Kaifu District, Changsha, Hunan; China
- Coordinates: 28°14′17″N 113°02′51″E
- Operated by: Changsha Metro
- Line: Line 5
- Platforms: 2 (1 island platform)

History
- Opened: 28 June 2020

Services
Preceding station	Changsha Metro	Following station
Yazipu towards Maozhutang	Line 5	North Yuehu Park towards Shuiduhe
Location

Malanshan station (Chinese: 马栏山站; pinyin: Mǎlánshān Zhàn) is a subway station in Kaifu District, Changsha, Hunan, China, operated by the Changsha subway operator Changsha Metro. It entered revenue service on 28 June 2020.

== History ==
The station started the test operation on 30 December 2019. The station opened on 28 June 2020.

== Surrounding area ==
- Hunan Moon Lake Market
- Hunan International Exhibition Center
- Hunan Broadcast TV station
