= Baimaopu station =

Metro station in Changsha, China

Baimaopu station 白茅铺站
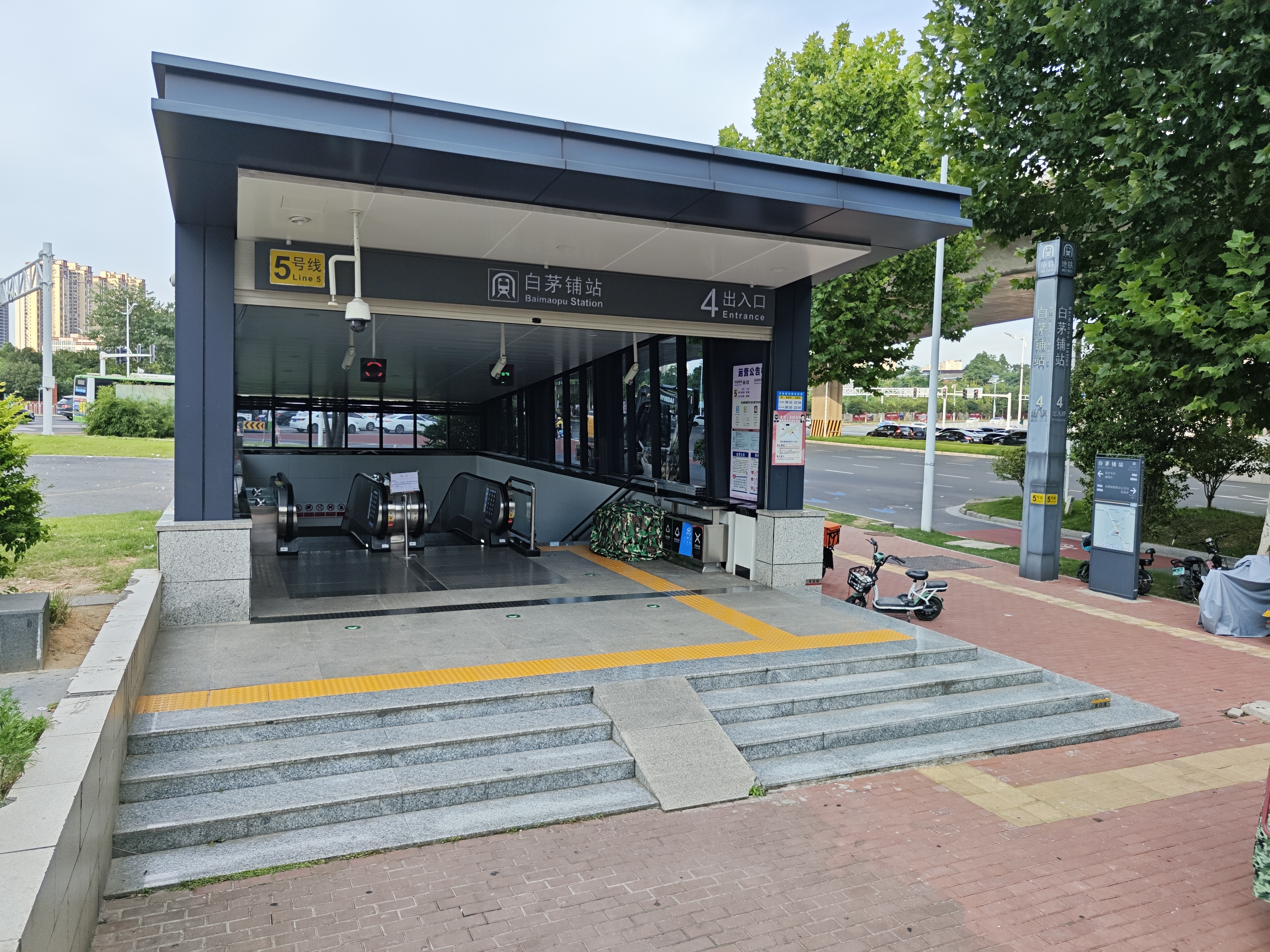
- Entrance 4

General information
- Location: Kaifu District, Changsha, Hunan; China
- Coordinates: 28°15′23″N 113°03′17″E
- Operated by: Changsha Metro
- Line(s): Line 5
- Platforms: 2 (1 island platform)

History
- Opened: 28 June 2020

Services
Preceding station	Changsha Metro	Following station
North Yuehu Park towards Maozhutang	Line 5	Tuqiao towards Shuiduhe

Baimaopu station (Chinese: 白茅铺站; pinyin: Báimáopù Zhàn) is a subway station in Kaifu District, Changsha, Hunan, China, operated by the Changsha subway operator Changsha Metro. It entered revenue service on 28 June 2020.

== History ==
The station started the test operation on 30 December 2019. The station opened on 28 June 2020.

== Surrounding area ==
- Changsha Military Engineering College
