= Datang station (Changsha Metro) =

Metro station in Changsha, China

Datang station 大塘站
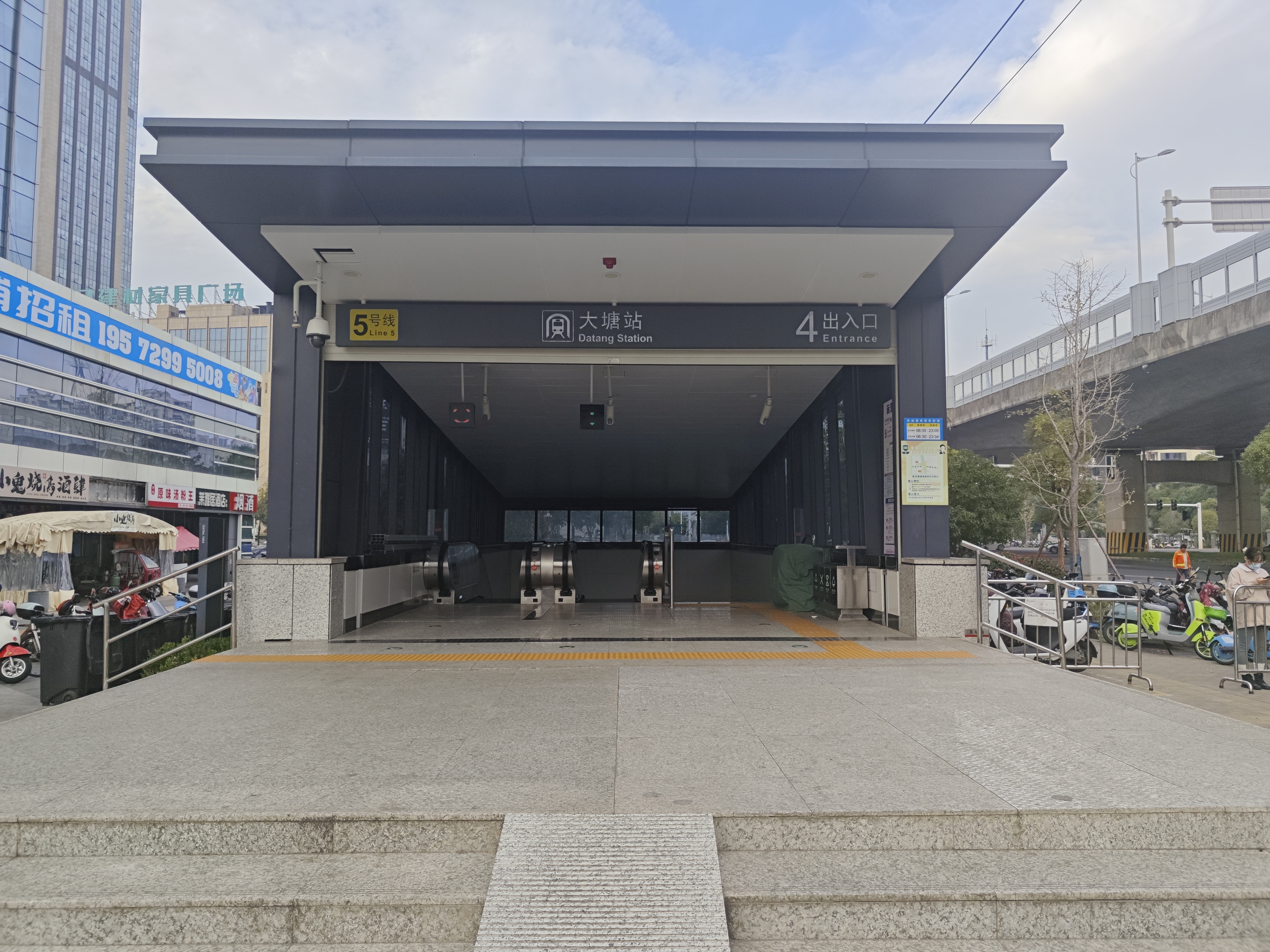
- Entrance 4

General information
- Location: Yuhua District, Changsha, Hunan; China
- Coordinates: 28°08′15″N 113°02′34″E
- Operated by: Changsha Metro
- Line: Line 5
- Platforms: 2 (1 island platform)

History
- Opened: 28 June 2020

Services
Preceding station	Changsha Metro	Following station
Bantangchong towards Maozhutang	Line 5	Yuhua District Government towards Shuiduhe
Location

Datang station (Chinese: 大塘站; pinyin: Dàtáng Zhàn) is a subway station in Yuhua District, Changsha, Hunan, China, operated by the Changsha subway operator Changsha Metro. It entered revenue service on 28 June 2020.

== History ==
The station started the test operation on 30 December 2019. The station opened on 28 June 2020.

== Surrounding area ==
- Changsha Environmental Protection Technical College
- Yanziling Community Park
- Guitang River Ecological park
