= Huojucun station =

Subway station in Changsha, Hunan, China

Huojucun station 火炬村站
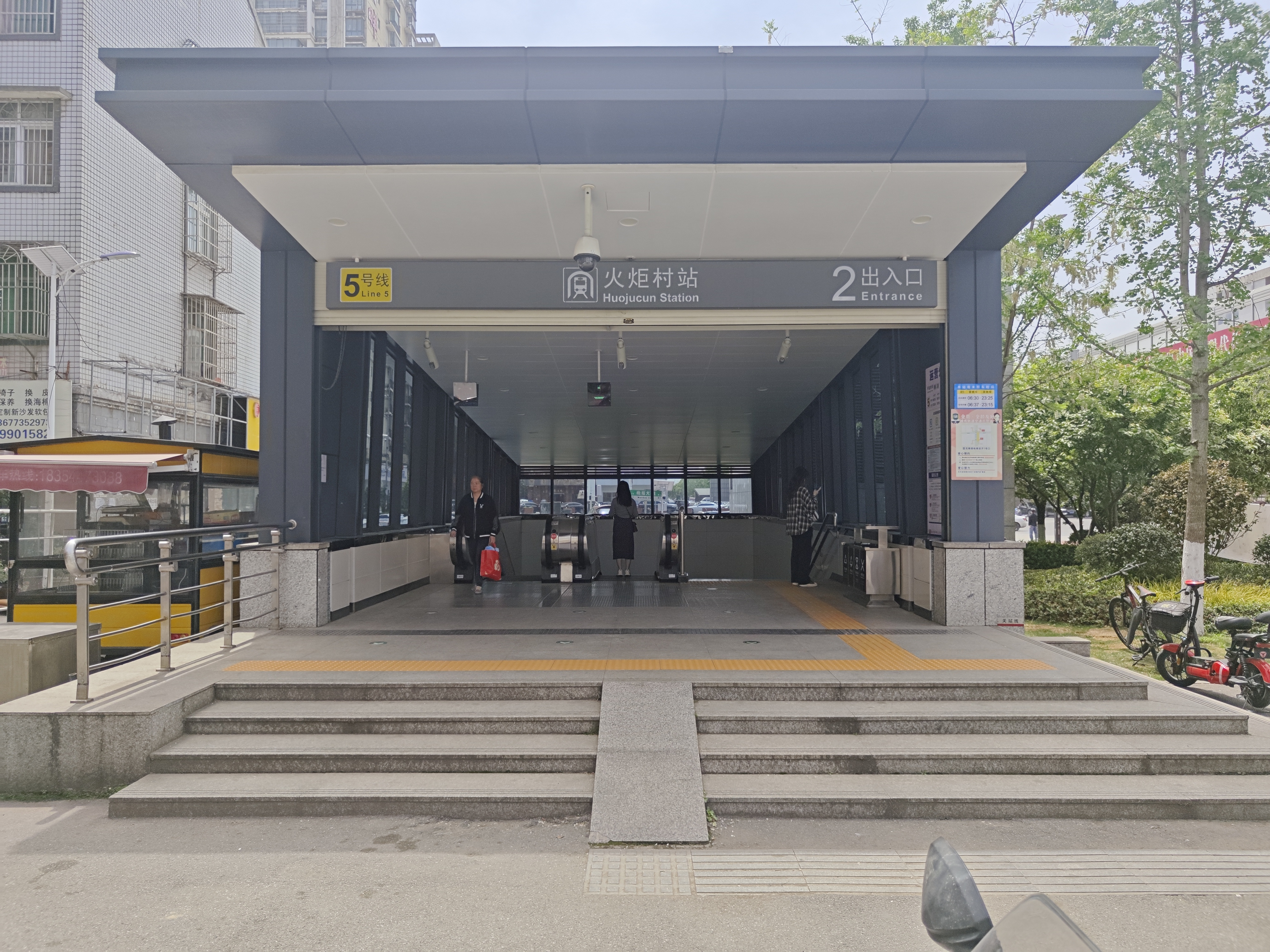
- Entrance 2

General information
- Location: Kaifu District, Changsha, Hunan; China
- Coordinates: 28°12′53″N 113°02′17″E
- Operated by: Changsha Metro
- Line: Line 5
- Platforms: 2 (1 island platform)

History
- Opened: 28 June 2020

Services
Preceding station	Changsha Metro	Following station
Mawangdui towards Maozhutang	Line 5	Yazipu towards Shuiduhe
Location

Huojucun station (Chinese: 火炬村站; pinyin: Huǒjùcūn Zhàn) is a subway station in Kaifu District, Changsha, Hunan, China, operated by the Changsha subway operator Changsha Metro. It entered revenue service on 28 June 2020.

== History ==
The station started the test operation on 30 December 2019. The station opened on 28 June 2020.

== Surrounding area ==
- Hunan People's Hospital
- Audit Department of Hunan
