= Tuqiao =

Tuqiao (Chinese: 土桥) can refer to two rapid transit stations in China:

- Tuqiao station (Beijing Subway)
- Tuqiao station (Changsha Metro)
