= Line 5 (Changsha Metro) =

Metro line in Changsha, China

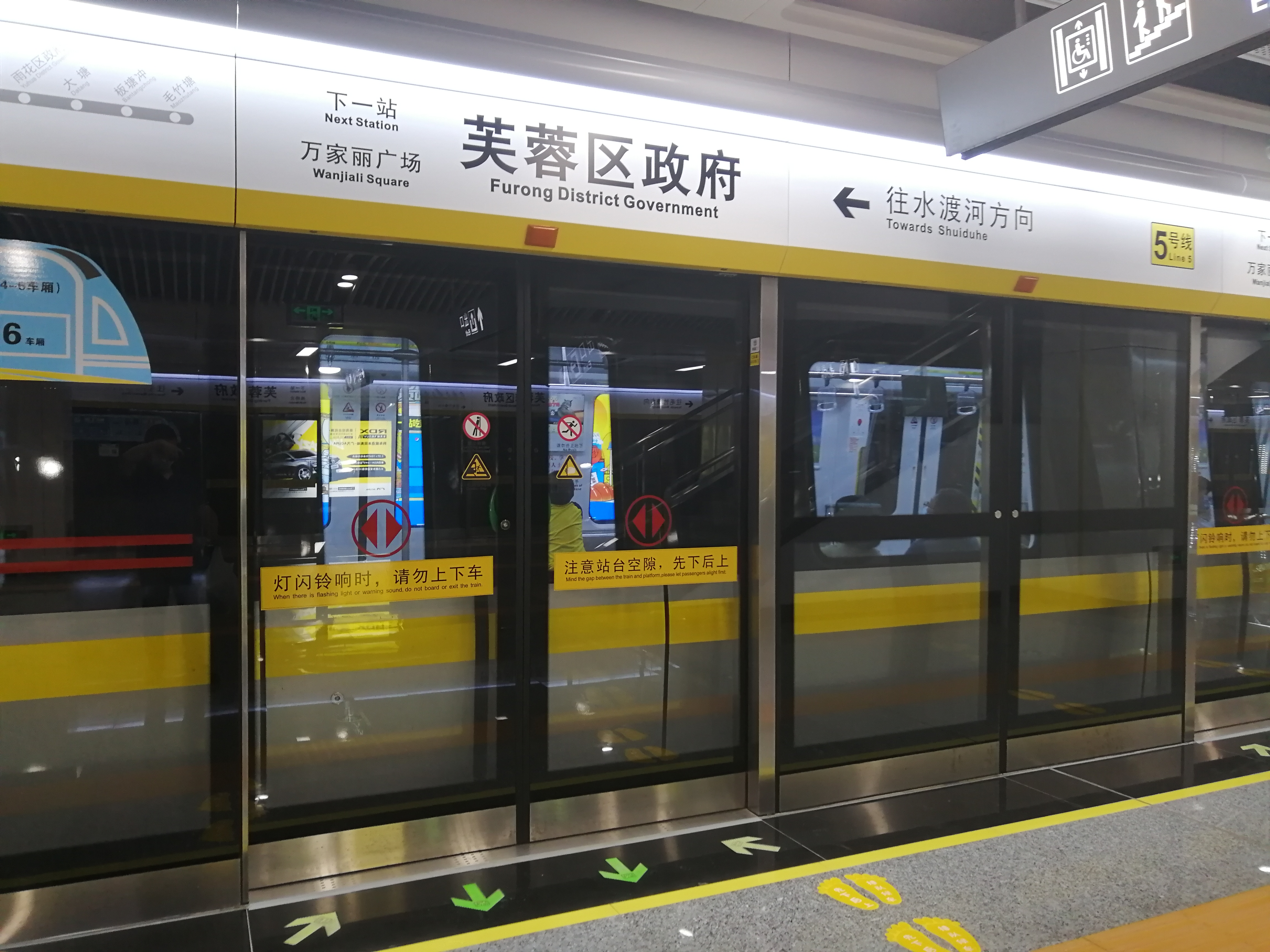

Overview
- Status: Operational
- Owner: Changsha Government
- Locale: Changsha, Hunan, China
- Termini: Maozhutang; Shuiduhe
- Stations: 18

Service
- Type: Rapid transit
- System: Changsha Metro
- Services: 1
- Operator(s): Changsha Metro Corporation

History
- Opened: 28 June 2020; 5 years ago

Technical
- Line length: 22.5 km (13.98 mi)
- Number of tracks: 2
- Character: Underground
- Track gauge: 1,435 mm (4 ft 8 1/2 in)

Line 5 of the Changsha Metro (Chinese: 长沙地铁五号线; pinyin: Chǎngshā Dìtiě Wǔ Hào Xiàn) is a rapid transit line in Changsha. The line opened on 28 June 2020 with 18 stations.

== History ==
Construction started on the line in November 2015, with trial running beginning on 30 December 2019. The line was opened to the public on 28 June 2020.

== Opening timeline ==
Segment	Commencement	Length	Station(s)	Name
Maozhutang — Shuiduhe	28 June 2020	22.5 km (13.98 mi)	18	Phase 1

== Rolling stock ==
The line is operated by 14 six-car Type B trainsets with permanent-magnet traction motors.

== Stations ==
Section	Station name		Connections	Distance km	Location
Section	English	Chinese	Connections	Distance km	Location
Phase 1	Maozhutang	毛竹塘			
Phase 1	Bantangchong	板塘冲			
Phase 1	Datang	大塘			
Phase 1	Yuhua District Government	雨花区政府			
Phase 1	Muqiao	木桥			
Phase 1	Guitang	圭塘	4		
Phase 1	South Gaoqiao	高桥南			
Phase 1	North Gaoqiao	高桥北			
Phase 1	Furong District Government	芙蓉区政府	6		
Phase 1	Wanjiali Square	万家丽广场	2		
Phase 1	Mawangdui	马王堆	7		
Phase 1	Huojucun	火炬村			
Phase 1	Yazipu	鸭子铺			
Phase 1	Malanshan	马栏山			
Phase 1	North Yuehu Park	月湖公园北	3		
Phase 1	Baimaopu	白茅铺			
Phase 1	Tuqiao	土桥			
Phase 1	Shuiduhe	水渡河			
