= Tuqiao station =

Tuqiao station may refer to:

- Tuqiao station (Changsha Metro), a metro station in Changsha, China (土桥站).
- Tuqiao station (Beijing Subway), a metro station in Beijing, China (土桥站).
