= Xiaoyuan Park =

Park in Changsha, China

- 晓园公园
- Location within Hunan
- Type: Public park
- Location: Furong District of Changsha, Hunan, China
- Coordinates: 28°12′N 113°01′E
- Area: 0.04-square-kilometre (0.015 sq mi)
- Created: 1984
- Open: 10 November 1986
- Status: Open all year

Chinese name
- Simplified Chinese: 晓园公园
- Traditional Chinese: 曉園公園
Transcriptions
Standard Mandarin
- Hanyu Pinyin: Xiǎoyuán Gōngyuán

Xiaoyuan Park (Chinese: 晓园公园) is a public park located in Furong District of Changsha, Hunan, China.

== History ==
Xiaoyuan Park was built beginning in 1984 by the Changsha Municipal People's Government and officially opened to the public on 10 November 1986. Due to the park's infrastructure was outdated, on April 13 of that year, it was completely closed for a comprehensive upgrade project, the park reopened on 1 October 2013, after nearly six months of renovations.

== Geography ==
Xiaoyuan Park is a small-scale park, covering an area of approximately 0.04-square-kilometre (0.015 sq mi). It is situated in the heart of Changsha, directly east of Changsha Railway Station and south of East Wuyi Road, making it a uniquely serene space in a bustling urban area.

=== Lakes ===
Xiaoyuan Park features an artificial lake known as Youth Lake (青年湖; Qīngnián Hú), which is shaped like the map of China.

=== Climate ===
Xiaoyuan Park enjoys a humid subtropical climate, characterized by hot, humid summers and generally cool, damp winters.

== Flora and fauna ==
Xiaoyuan Park is designed with a diverse collection of ornamental plants and trees. Its most prominent floral feature is the cherry blossom grove, which was significantly expanded during the 2013 renovation and has established the park as one of Changsha's classic spots for cherry blossom viewing. Other notable plants include osmanthus, magnolia, and water lilies.

== Main attractions ==
- Sino-Japanese "Friendship and Peace" Bronze Sculpture: located in a cherry blossom pavilion, the statue group was a gift from Kagoshima City, Japan. It consists of four groups of eight Chinese and Japanese youth figures, symbolizing the enduring friendship between the two nations.
- Yingxu Pavilion (迎旭亭; Yíngxù Tíng; 'Pavilion of the Sunrise')
- Shuangxiu Pavilion (双秀亭; 雙秀亭; Shuāngxiù Tíng; 'Double Beauty Pavilion')
- Half Pavilion (半亭; Bàn Tíng)
- East Garden (东苑; 東苑; Dōng Yuàn)
- Yunshuiju Teahouse (云水居茶楼; 雲水居茶樓; Yúnshuǐjū Chálóu)
- Children's Play Area: the area features a marble sculpture titled "Mother and Son" by sculptor Zhu Weijing, along with several animal sculptures, creating a warm and family-friendly atmosphere.

== Transportation ==
The park is conveniently accessible via Changsha's metro system. The relevant stations are: Changsha railway station, served by Line 2 and Line 3.
