= Shumuling station =

Metro station in Changsha, China

Shumuling station (simplified Chinese: 树木岭站; traditional Chinese: 樹木嶺站; pinyin: Shùmùlǐng Zhàn) is an interchange station for Line 4 and Changsha–Zhuzhou–Xiangtan intercity railway of the Changsha subway.

== China Railway ==
Shumuling railway station 树木岭站
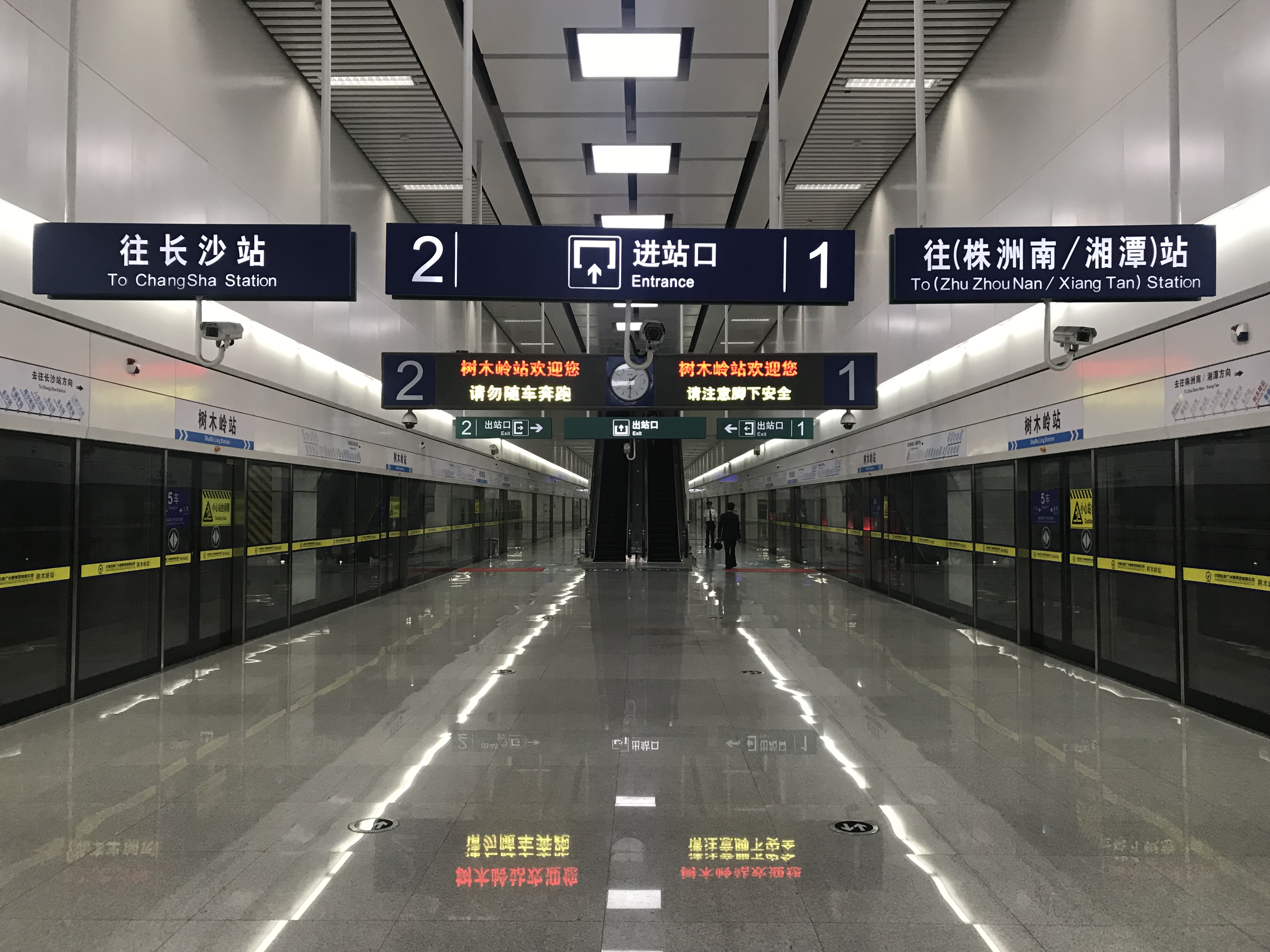
- Platform

General information
- Location: Yuhua District, Changsha, Hunan; China
- Coordinates: 28°09′45″N 113°01′40″E
- Operated by: CR Guangzhou
- Line: Changsha-Zhuzhou-Xiangtan intercity railway
- Platforms: 1 island platform

History
- Opened: 26 Dec 2016
Location

Shumuling station is a railway station in Yuhua District, Changsha, Hunan, China, operated by CR Guangzhou. It opened its services on 26 December 2016. Shumuling station offers interchange to the Changsha Metro Line 4.

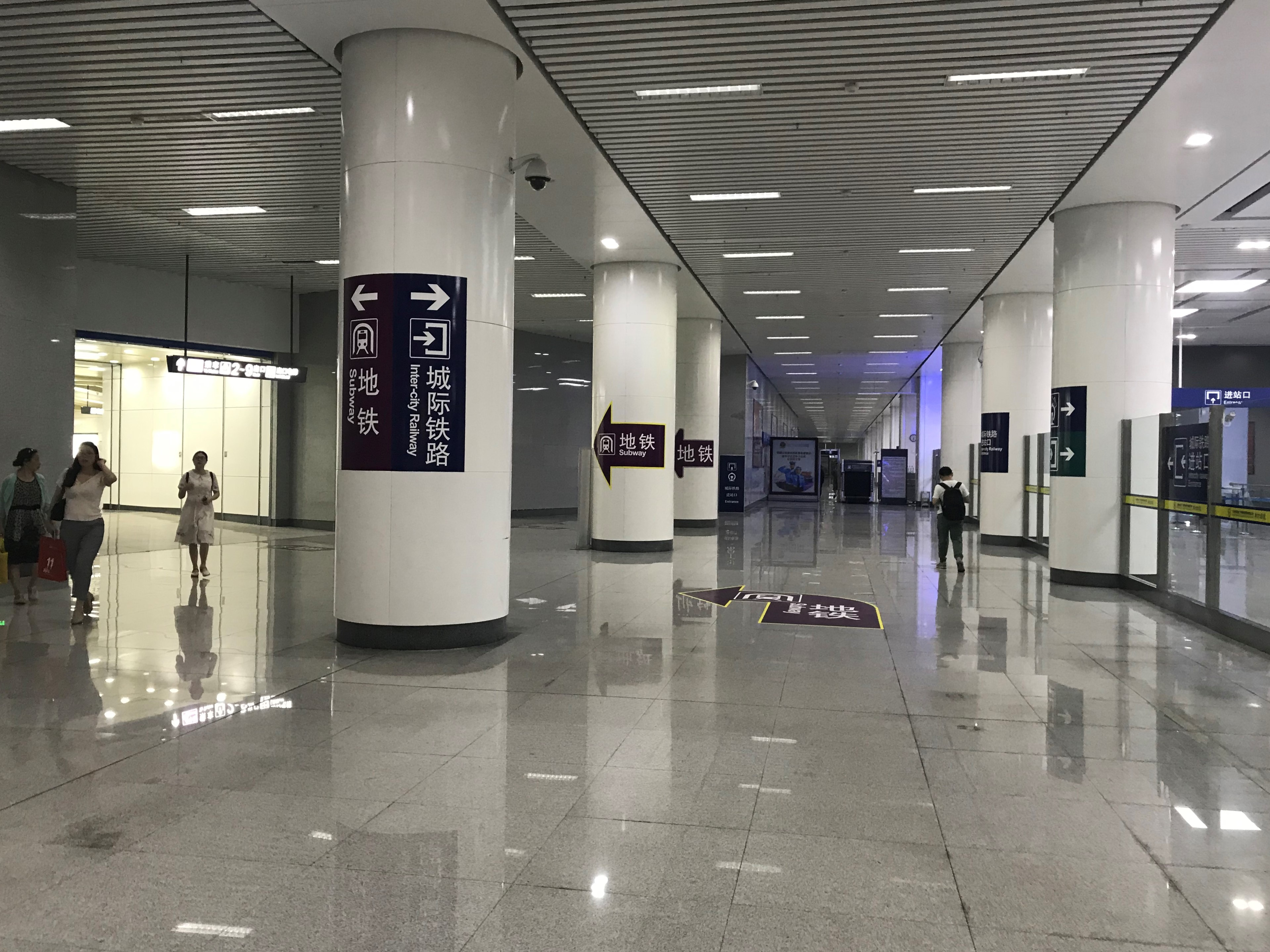
Railway concourse and interchange corridor

== Changsha Metro ==
Shumuling station 树木岭站
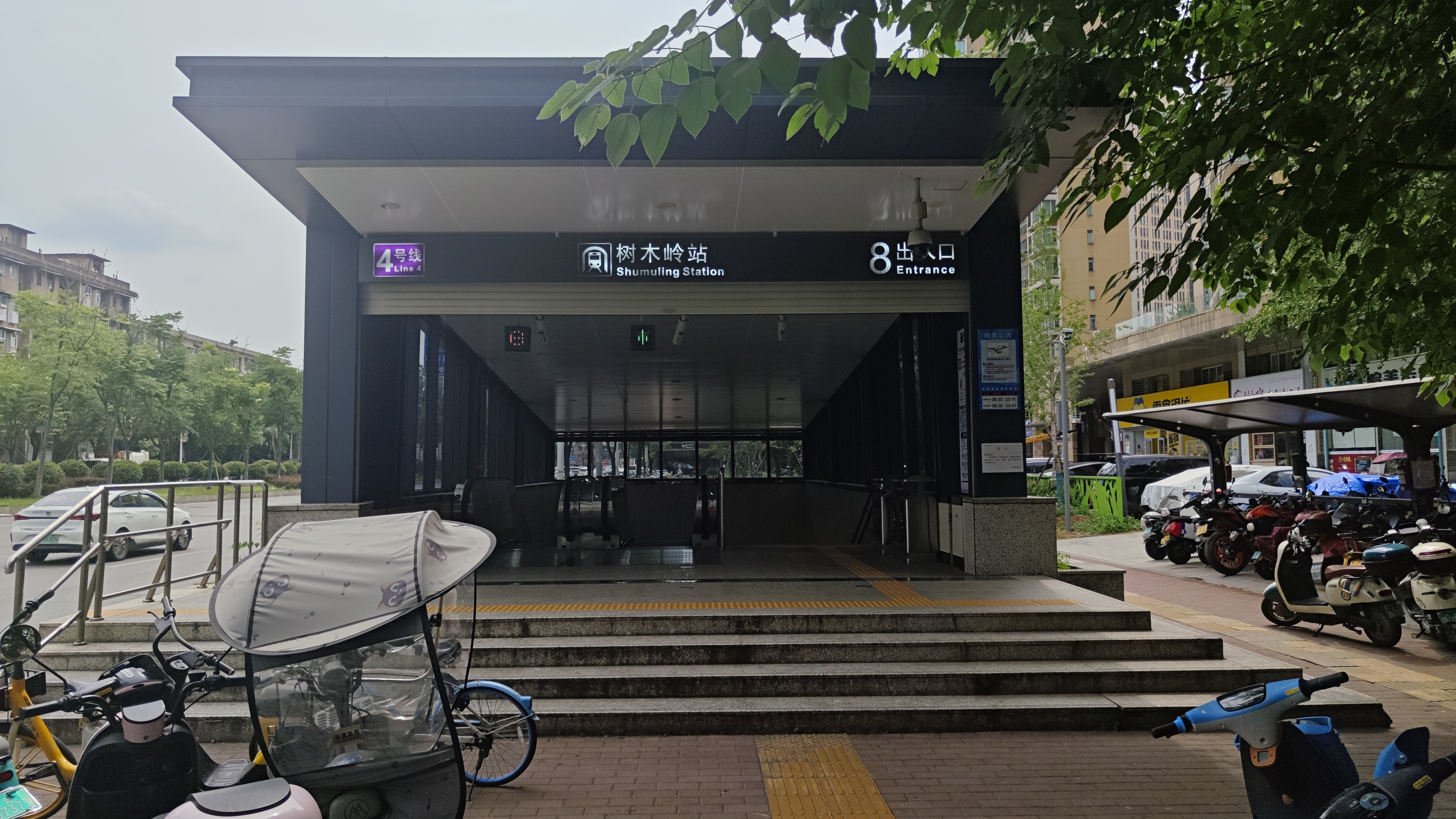
- No. 8 Entrance of Shumuling Station

General information
- Location: Yuhua District, Changsha, Hunan; China
- Coordinates: 28°09′45″N 113°01′40″E
- Operated by: Changsha Metro
- Line: Line 4
- Platforms: 1 island platform

History
- Opened: 26 May 2019

Services
Preceding station	Changsha Metro	Following station
Chigangling towards Guanziling	Line 4	Guitang towards Dujiaping
Location

Shumuling station is a subway station in Yuhua District, Changsha, Hunan, China, operated by the Changsha subway operator Changsha Metro.

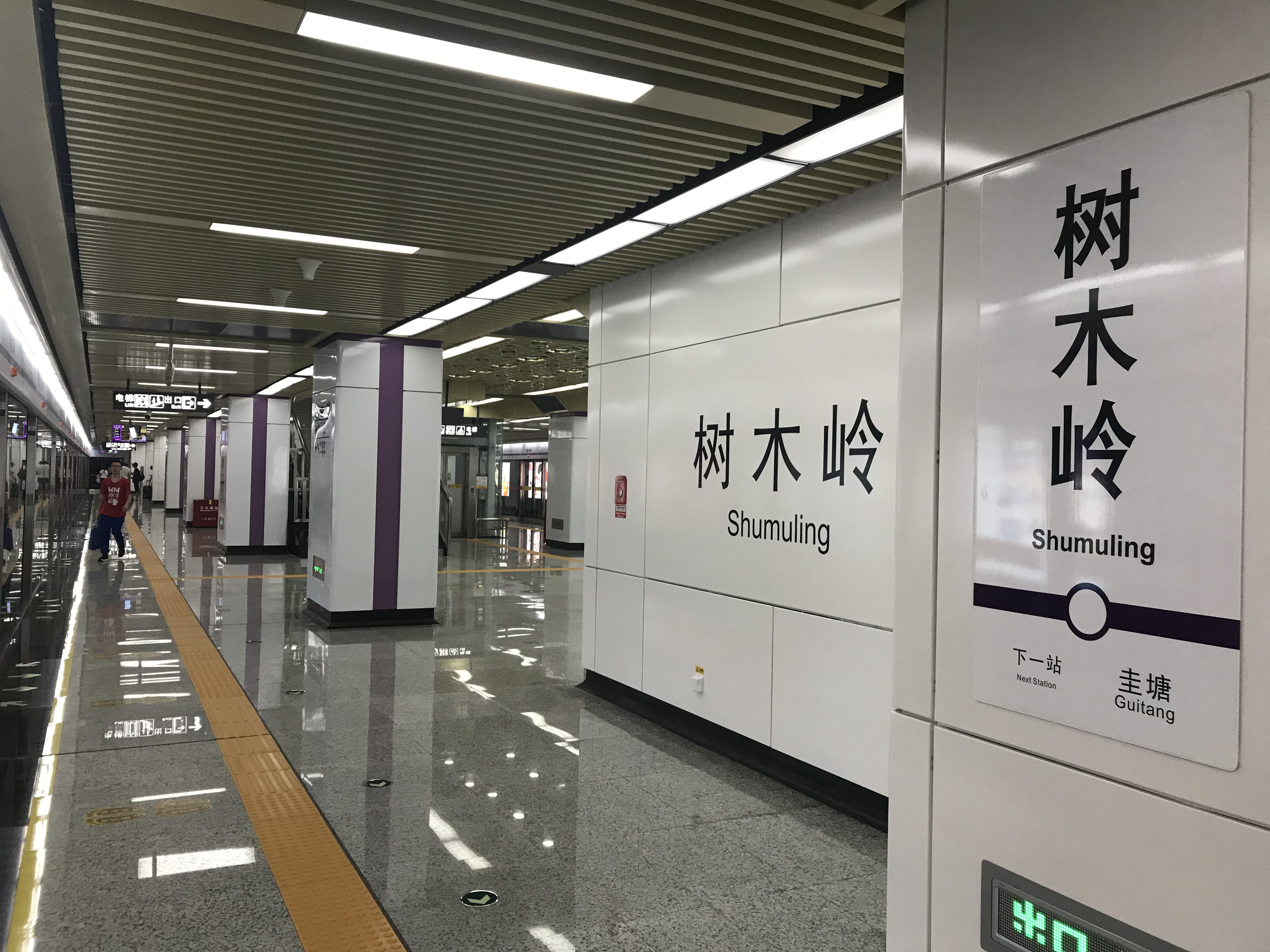
Metro platform

=== Station layout ===
The station has one island platform.

G		Exits
LG1	Concourse	Faregates, Station Agent
LG2	←	Line 4 towards Guanziling (Chigangling)
LG2	Island platform, doors open on the left
LG2		Line 4 towards Dujiaping (Guitang)	→

=== History ===
The station was completed in September 2017. The station opened on 26 May 2019.

== Surrounding area ==
- Shumuling School
- Ziranling School (自然岭小学)
- Hunan Industrial and Trade School
- Changsha Hydrological and Water Resources Survey Bureau (长沙水文水资源勘测局)
