= Tuqiao station (Changsha Metro) =

Metro station in Changsha, China

Tuqiao station 土桥站
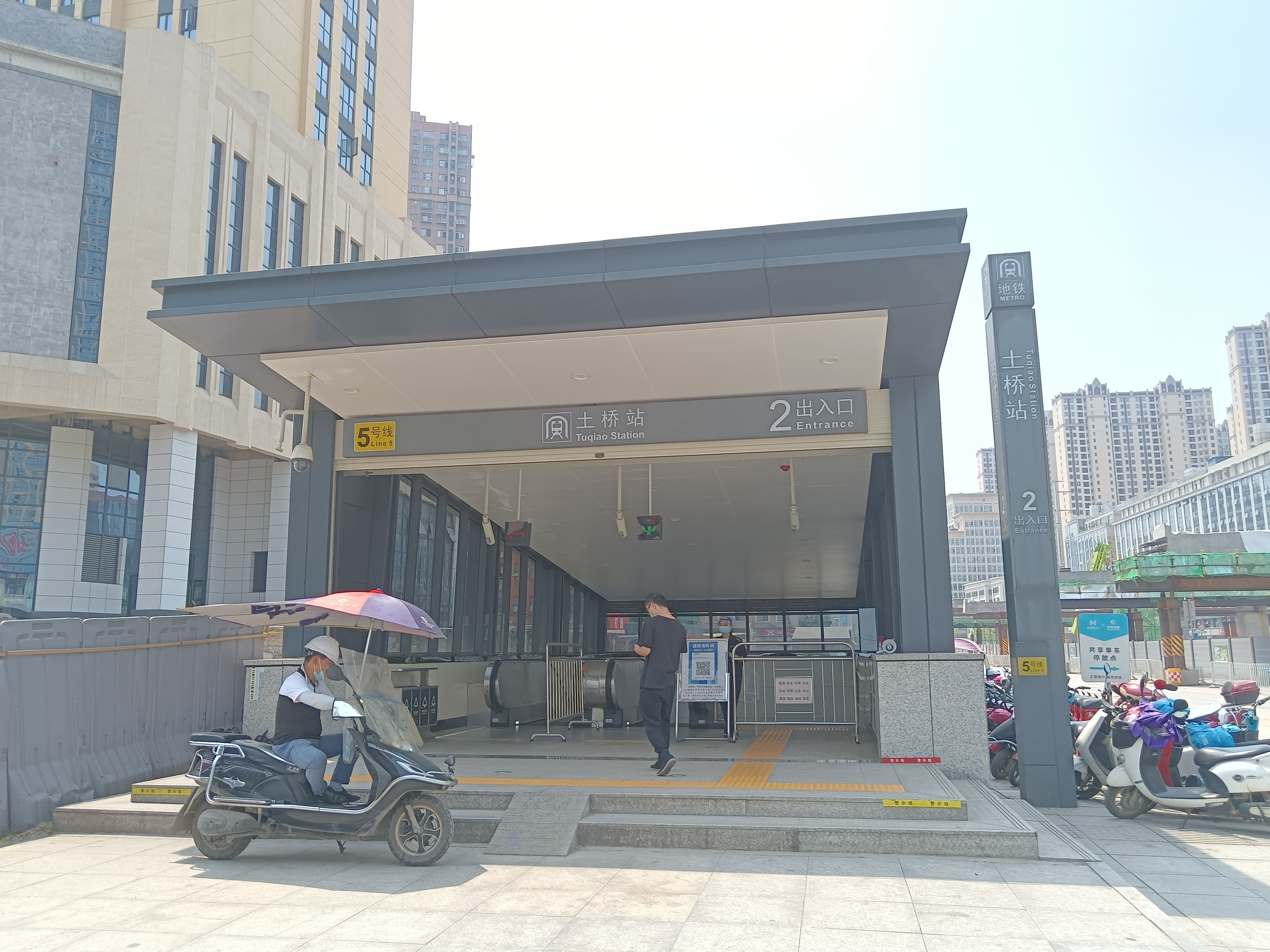
- No. 2 Entrance of Tuqiao Station

General information
- Location: Tianxin District, Changsha, Hunan; China
- Coordinates: 28°16′11″N 113°03′44″E
- Operated by: Changsha Metro
- Line(s): Line 5
- Platforms: 2 (1 island platform)

History
- Opened: 28 June 2020

Services
Preceding station	Changsha Metro	Following station
Baimaopu towards Maozhutang	Line 5	Shuiduhe Terminus
Location

Tuqiao station (Chinese: 土桥站; pinyin: Tǔqiáo Zhàn) is a subway station in Tianxin District, Changsha, Hunan, China, operated by the Changsha subway operator Changsha Metro. It entered revenue service on 28 June 2020.

== History ==
The station started the test operation on 30 December 2019. The station opened on 28 June 2020.

== Surrounding area ==
- Hunan Mechanical and Electrical Technology College
- Hunan Safety Technology College
