= Changsha Municipal People's Government =

Local government administrative in China

- 长沙市人民政府

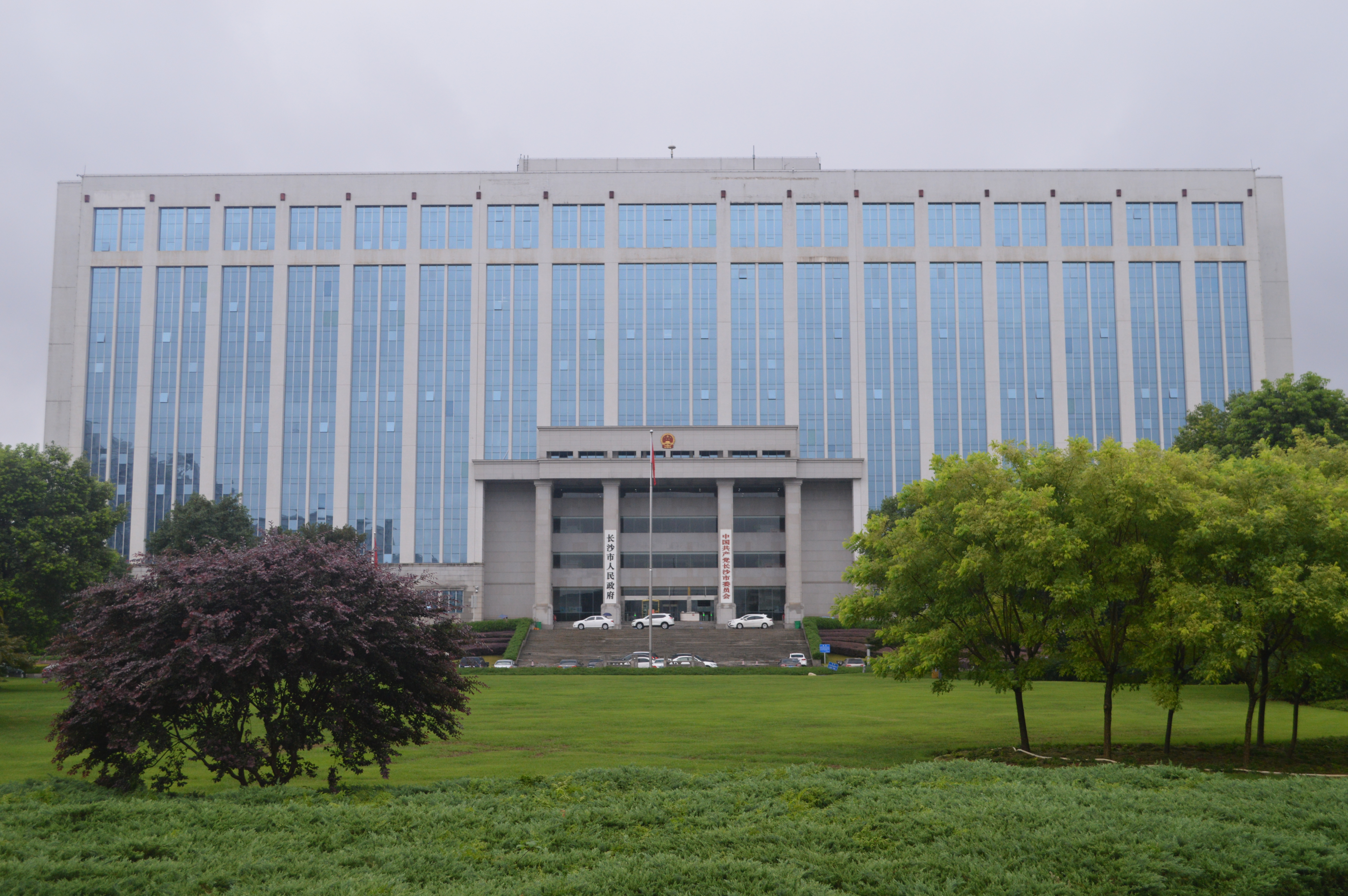
- Changsha Government Building.

Agency overview
- Jurisdiction: Hunan Provincial People's Government
- Headquarters: Yuelu District, Changsha, Hunan, China; 28°14′04″N 112°56′43″E
- Agency executive: Zheng Jianxin, Mayor
- Website: en.changsha.gov.cn

The Changsha Municipal People's Government (simplified Chinese: 长沙市人民政府; traditional Chinese: 長沙市人民政府; pinyin: Chángshāshì Zhèngfǔ) is the top-tier local government administrative body of the People's Republic of China that governs the prefecture-level city of Changsha, the capital of Hunan province. The current mayor is Zheng Jianxin.

== Organization ==
- Logistics and Port Office
- General Office
- Development and Reform Commission
- Education Bureau
- Science and Technology Bureau
- Bureau of Industry and Information Technology
- Ethnic and Religious Affairs Bureau
- Public Security Bureau
- Civil Affairs Bureau
- Justice Bureau
- Finance Bureau
- Human Resources and Social Security Bureau
- Bureau of Natural Resources and Planning
- Ecological Environment Bureau
- Bureau of Housing and Urban-Rural Development
- Transportation Bureau
- Water Conservation Bureau
- Bureau of Rural and Agriculture Affairs
- Commerce Bureau
- Bureau of Culture, Tourism, Radio and Television
- Health and Family Planning Commission
- Auditing Bureau
- Bureau of Veterans Affairs
- Department of Emergency Management
- State-owned Assets Supervision and Administration Commission
- Forestry Bureau
- Administration for Market Regulation
- Sports Bureau
- Statistics Bureau
- Bureau of City Administration and Comprehensive Law Enforcement

== Mayor ==
The mayor of Changsha is the chief executive officer of the city. Under the mayor there are one executive vice mayor and seven vice-mayors.

== Gallery ==
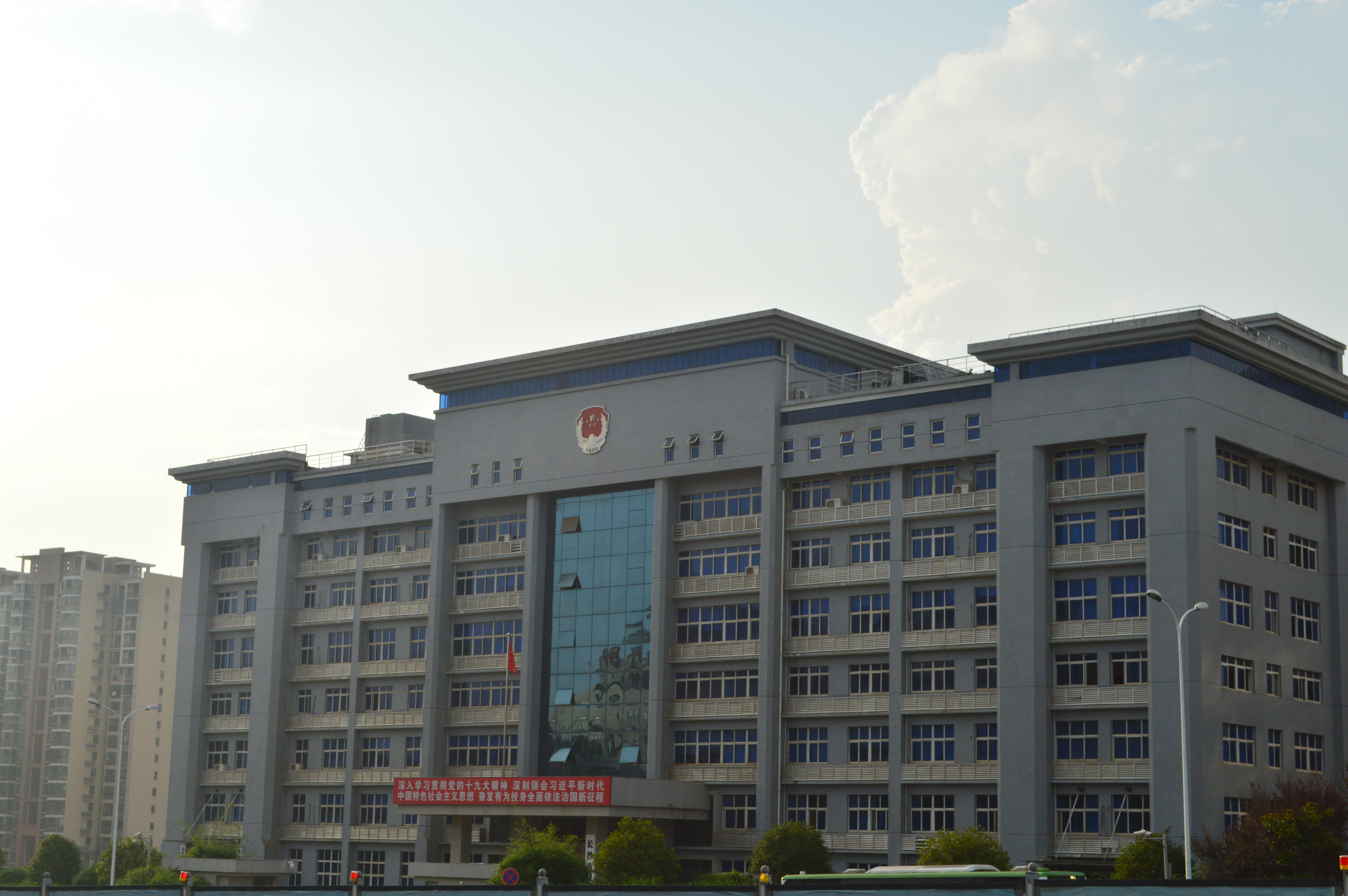
Justice Bureau.

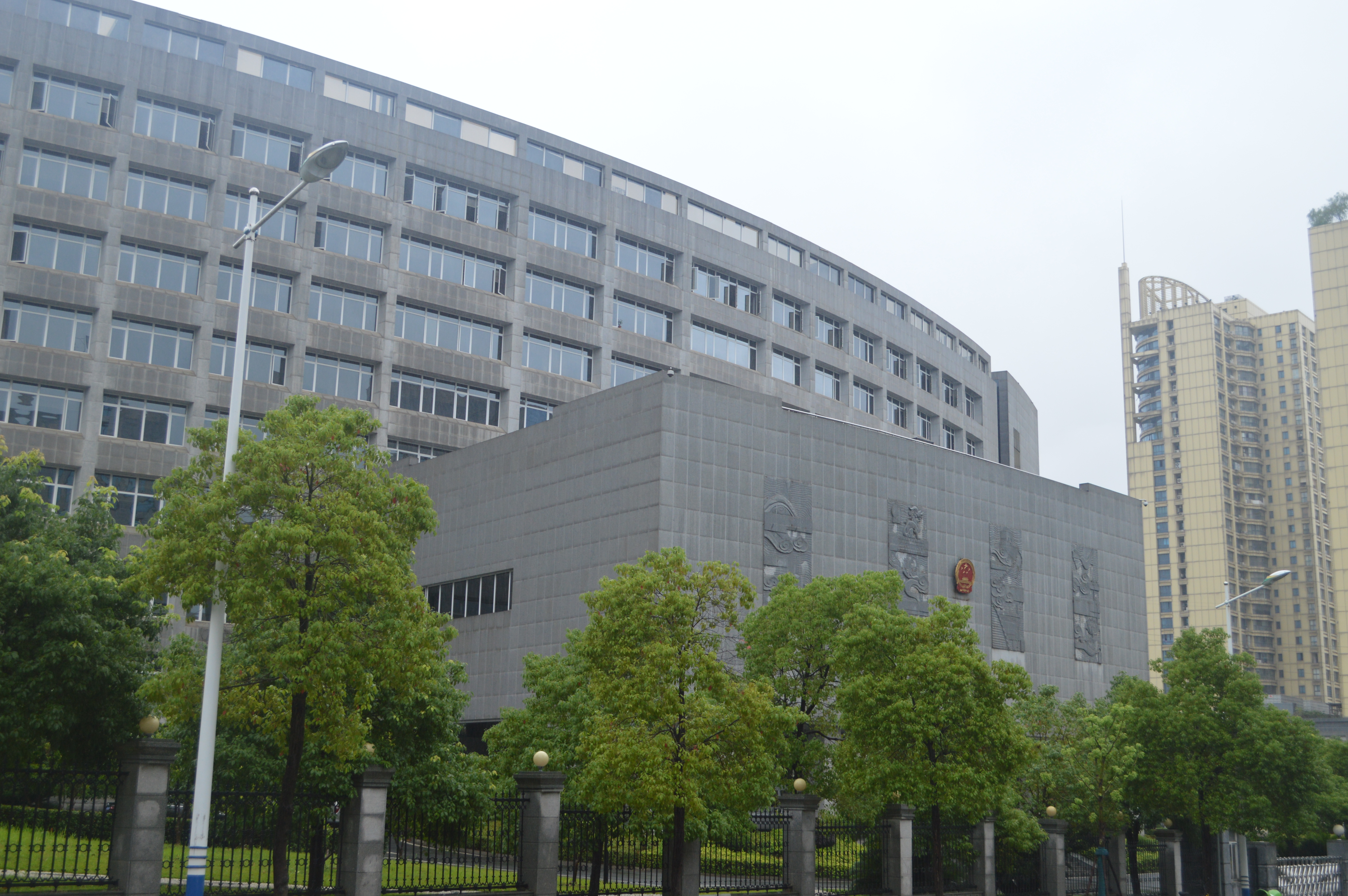
Public Works Bureau.

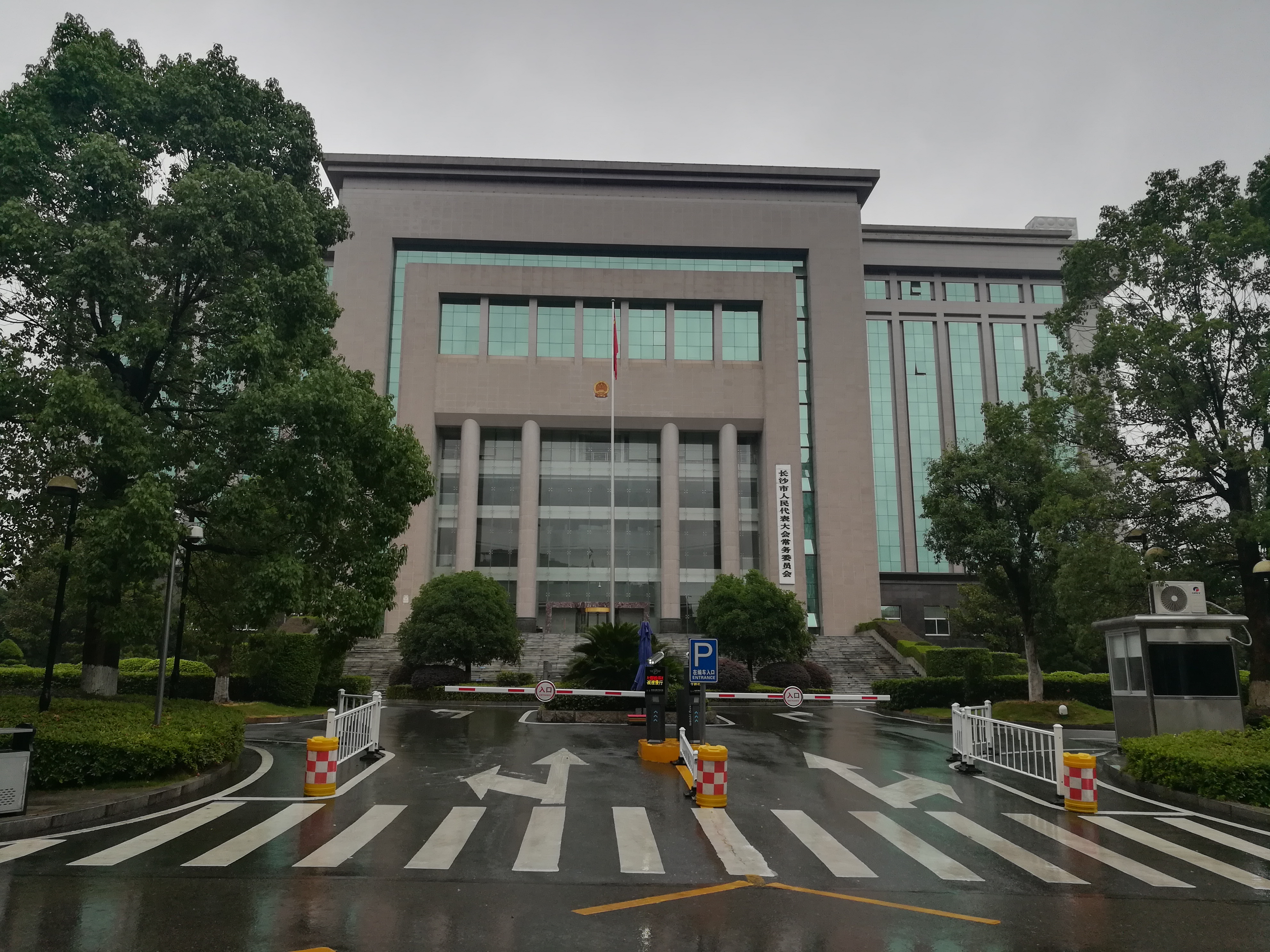
People's Congress.

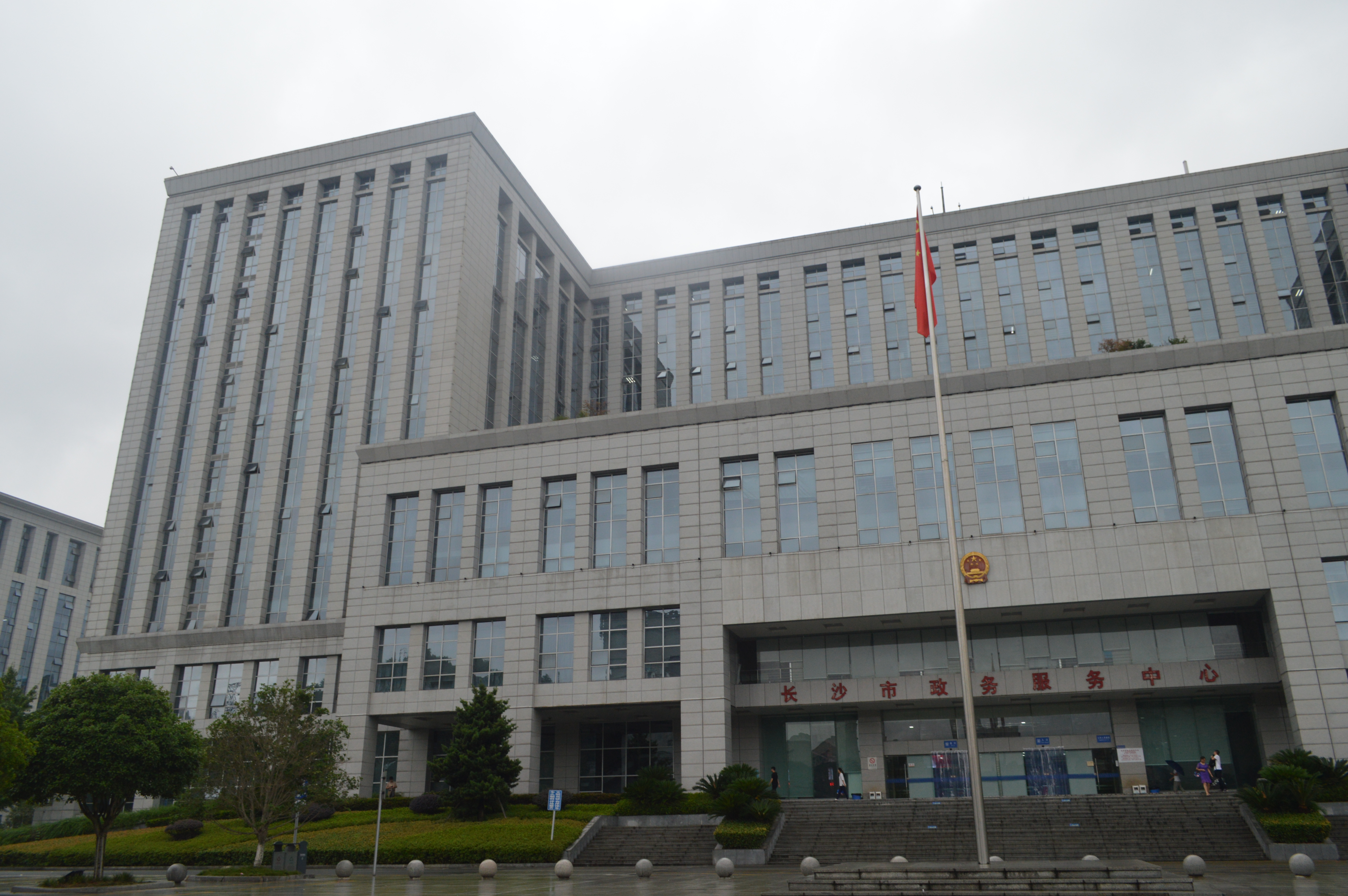
Affairs Service Center.

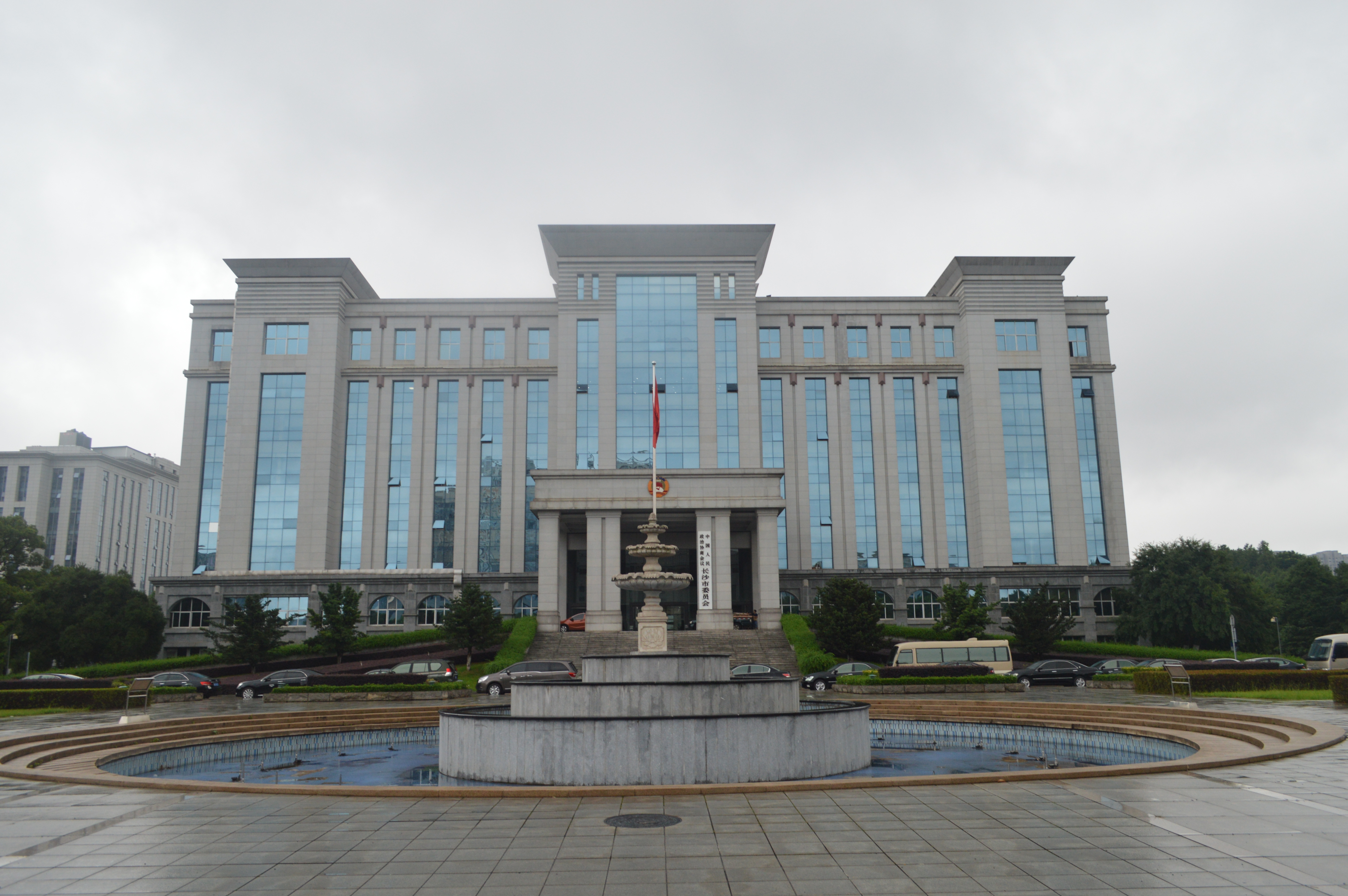
Chinese People's Political Consultative Conference.
