= Hunan Botanical Garden =

Botanical garden and arboretum in China

- 湖南省森林植物园
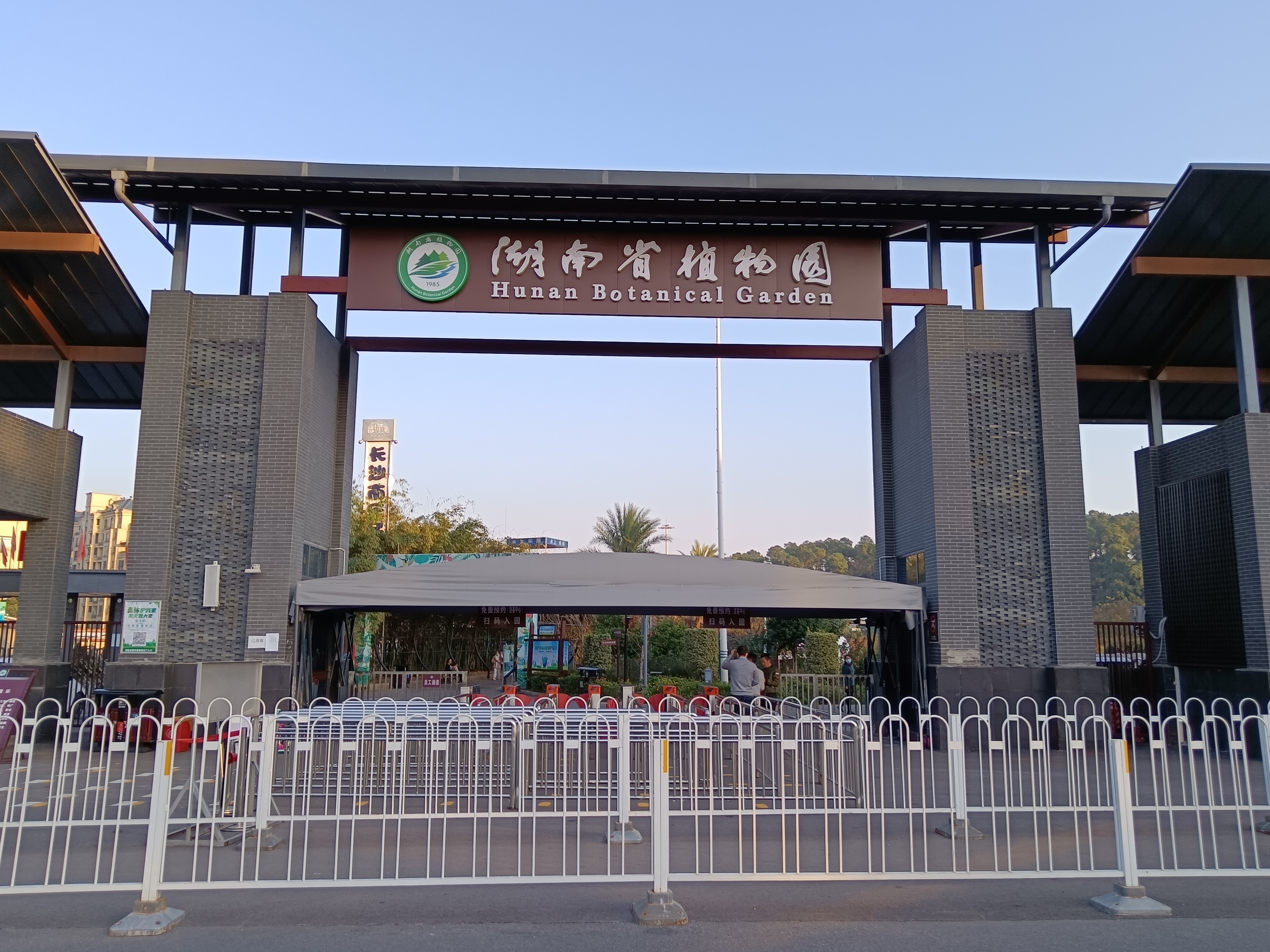
- Entrance of Hunan Botanical Garden

- Location within Hunan
- Type: Public park, urban park
- Location: Yuhua District of Changsha, Hunan, China
- Coordinates: 28°06′27″N 113°01′33″E
- Area: 1.4 square kilometres (0.54 sq mi)
- Created: 1985
- Founder: Government of Hunan
- Status: Open all year
- Website: www.hnfbg.cn

Hunan Botanical Garden (simplified Chinese: 湖南省植物园; traditional Chinese: 湖南省植物園; pinyin: Húnánshěng Zhíwùyuán), formerly known as Hunan Forest Botanical Garden (湖南省森林植物园; Húnánshěng Sēnlín Zhíwùyuán), is a botanical garden and arboretum located in Yuhua District of Changsha, Hunan, China. Covering an area of 1.4 square kilometres (350 acres), the garden was established in 1985 and opened to the public in 1985. It serves multiple functions, including botanical research, scientific education, ex situ conservation, exhibition, and tourism. It is also the only integrated organization for botanical research, conservation and utilization in Hunan.

== History ==
Hunan Botanical Garden was established and opened to the public in 1985. In January 2012, it has been designated as an AAAA level tourist site by the China National Tourism Administration.

In June 2021, it was renamed Hunan Botanical Garden.

== Climate ==
Hunan Botanical Garden is in the subtropical monsoon climate zone, with an average annual temperature of 17.2 °C (63.0 °F) and total annual rainfall of 1,361.6 millimetres (53.61 in). It enjoys four distinct seasons, rain and heat over the same period, and abundant precipitation.

== Gardens ==
- Cherry Garden (樱花园)
- Magnolia Garden (木兰园)
- Camellia Garden (茶花园)
- Rhododendron Garden (国家杜鹃园)
- World Famous Flowers Garden (世界名花园)
- Shade tolerance Garden (荫生植物园)
- Bamboo Garden (观赏竹园)

== Gallery ==
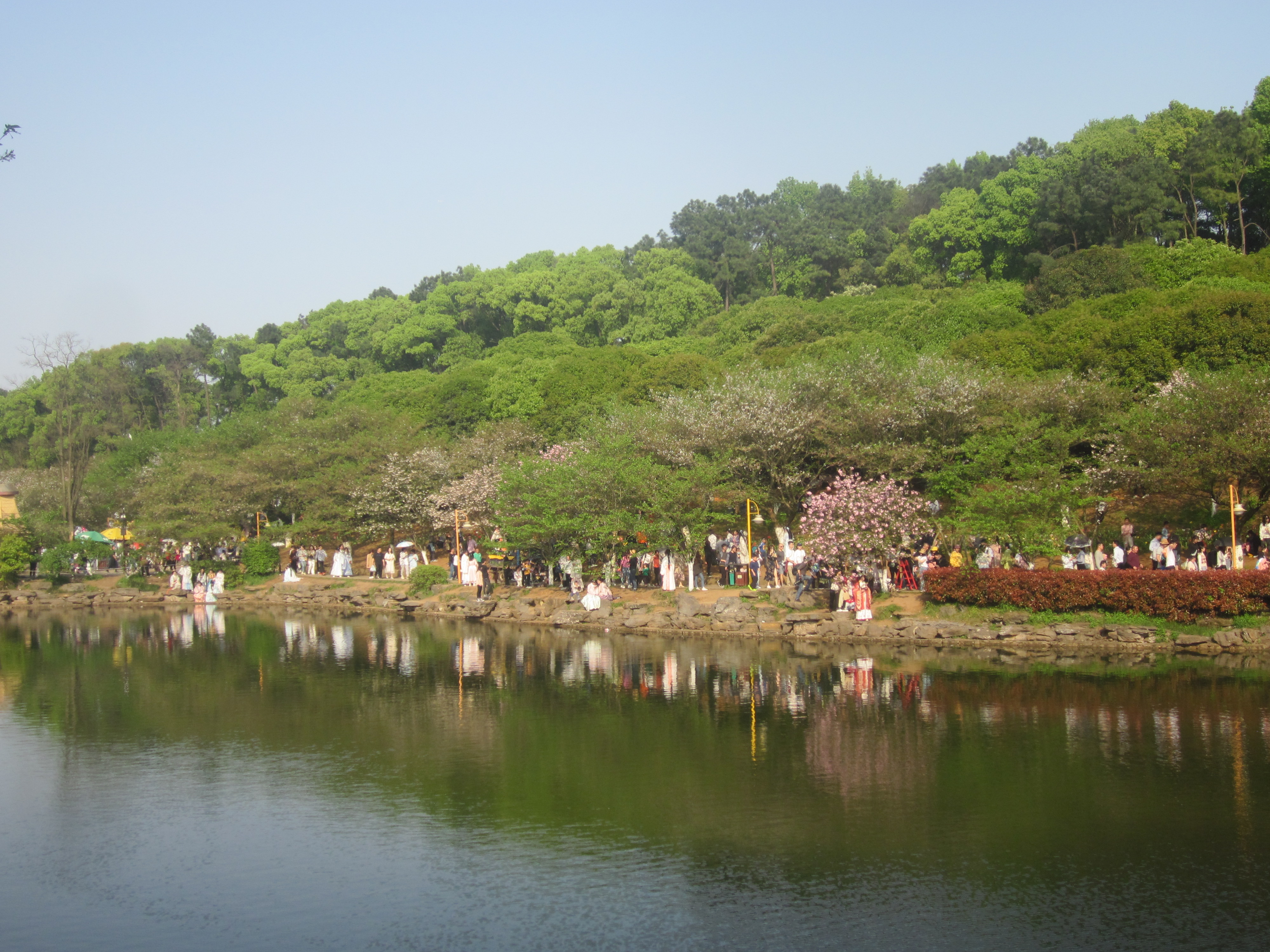
Cherry blossoms at Hunan Botanical Garden.

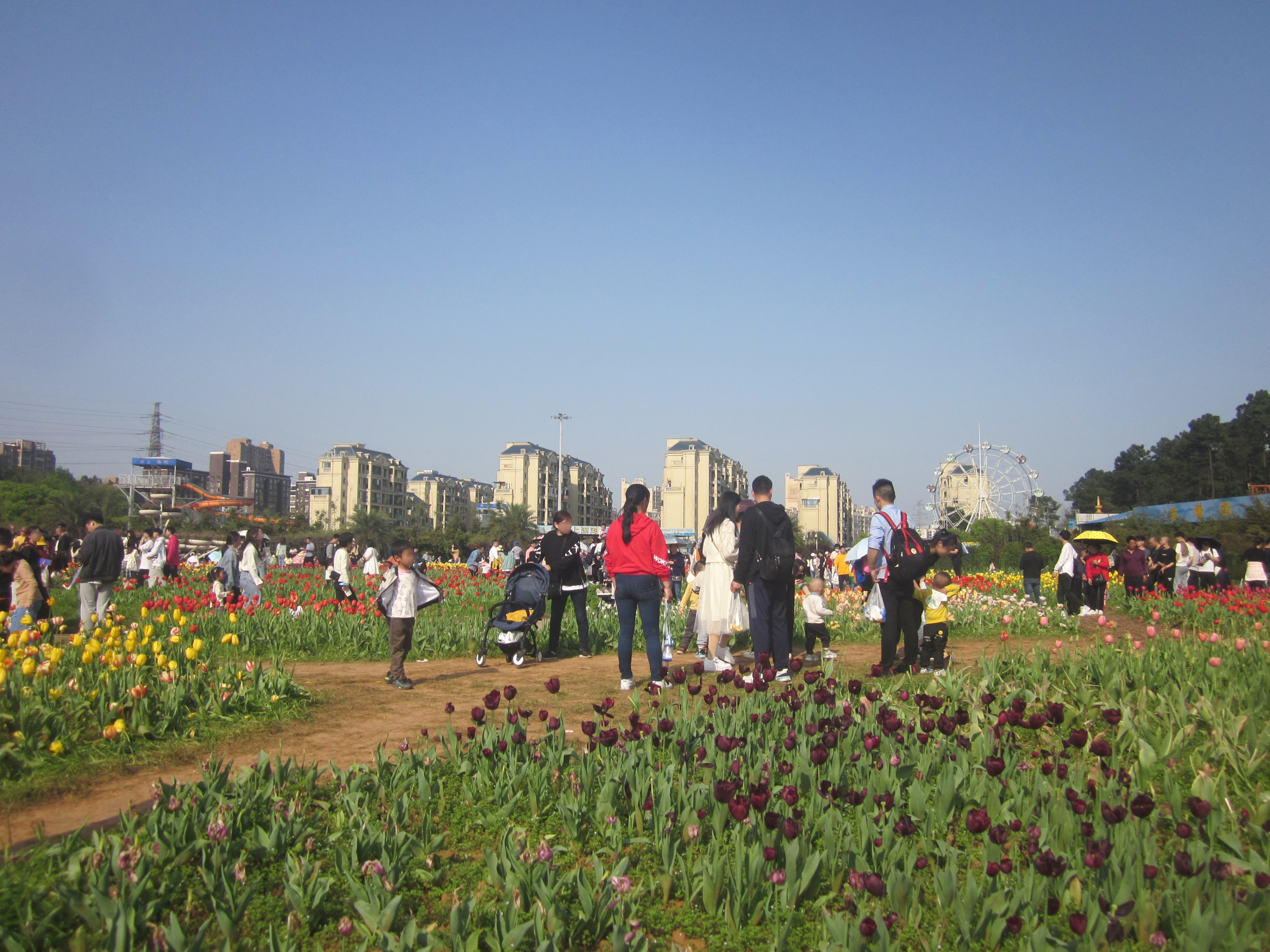
Tulipa gesneriana in Hunan Botanical Garden are in full blossom.

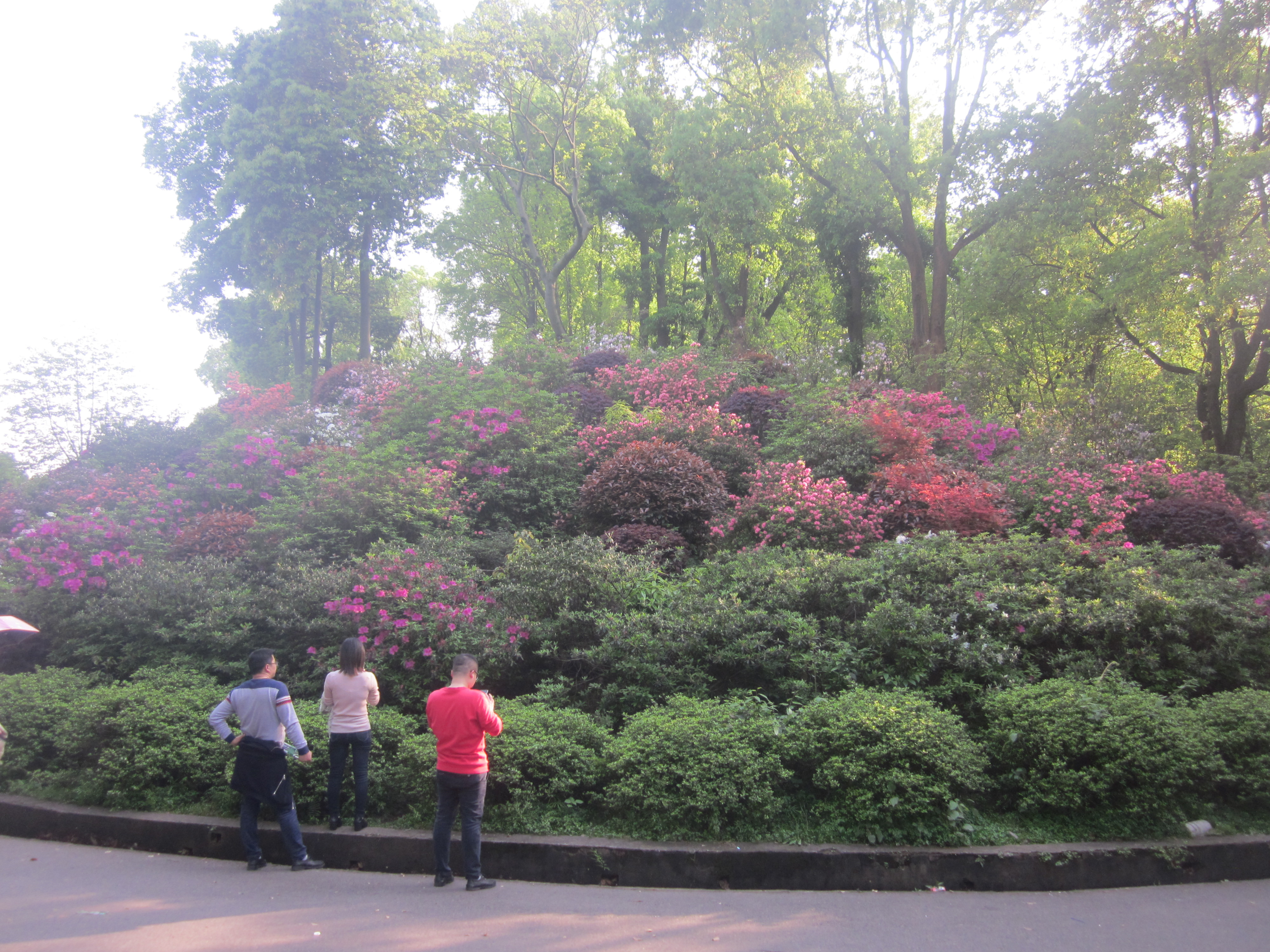
Rhododendron blossoms at Hunan Botanical Garden.

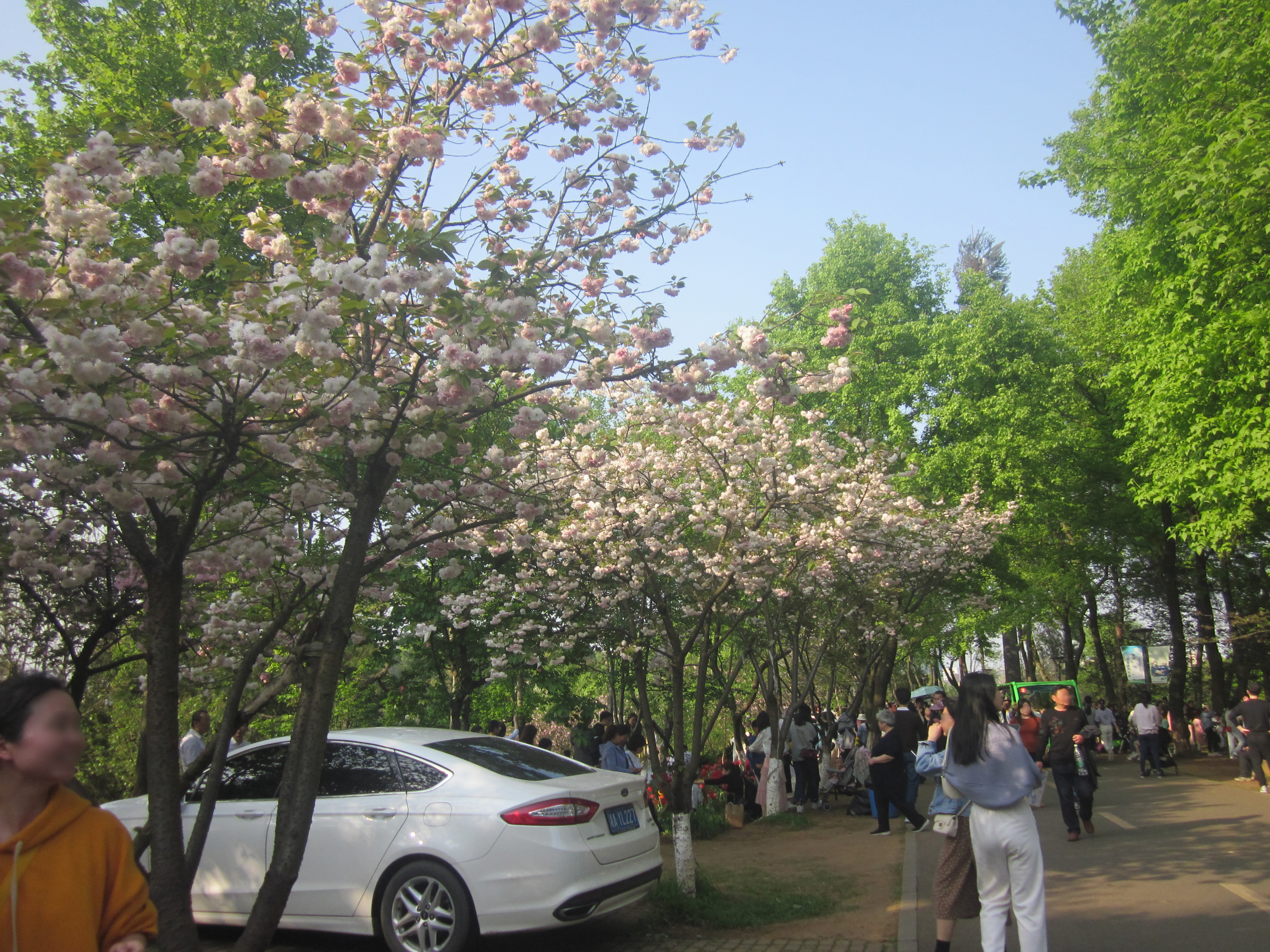
Cherry blossoms at Hunan Botanical Garden.
