= Maozhutang station =

Metro station in Changsha, China

Maozhutang station 毛竹塘站
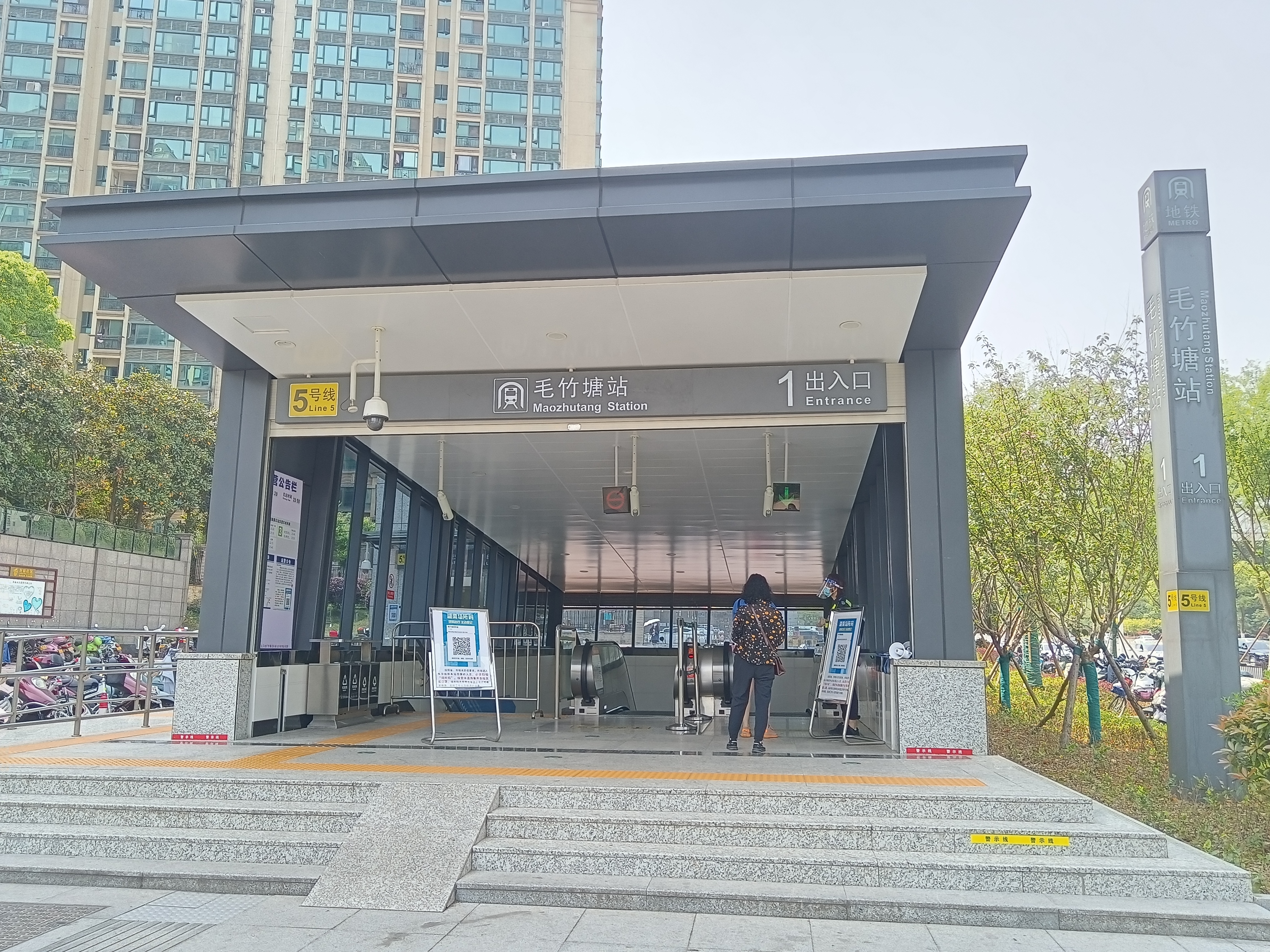
- Entrance 1

General information
- Location: Yuhua District, Changsha, Hunan; China
- Coordinates: 28°06′04″N 113°02′35″E
- Operated by: Changsha Metro
- Line(s): Line 5
- Platforms: 2 (1 island platform)

History
- Opened: 28 June 2020

Services
Preceding station	Changsha Metro	Following station
Terminus	Line 5	Bantangchong towards Shuiduhe

Maozhutang station (Chinese: 毛竹塘站; pinyin: Máozhútáng Zhàn) is a subway station in Yuhua District, Changsha, Hunan, China, operated by the Changsha subway operator Changsha Metro. It entered revenue service on 28 June 2020.

== History ==
The station started the test operation on 30 December 2019. The station opened on 28 June 2020.

== Surrounding area ==
- Lion Mountain Park
- Red Star Flower Market
- Hunan Forest Botanical Garden
