= Shuiduhe station =

Metro station in Changsha, China

Shuiduhe station 水渡河站
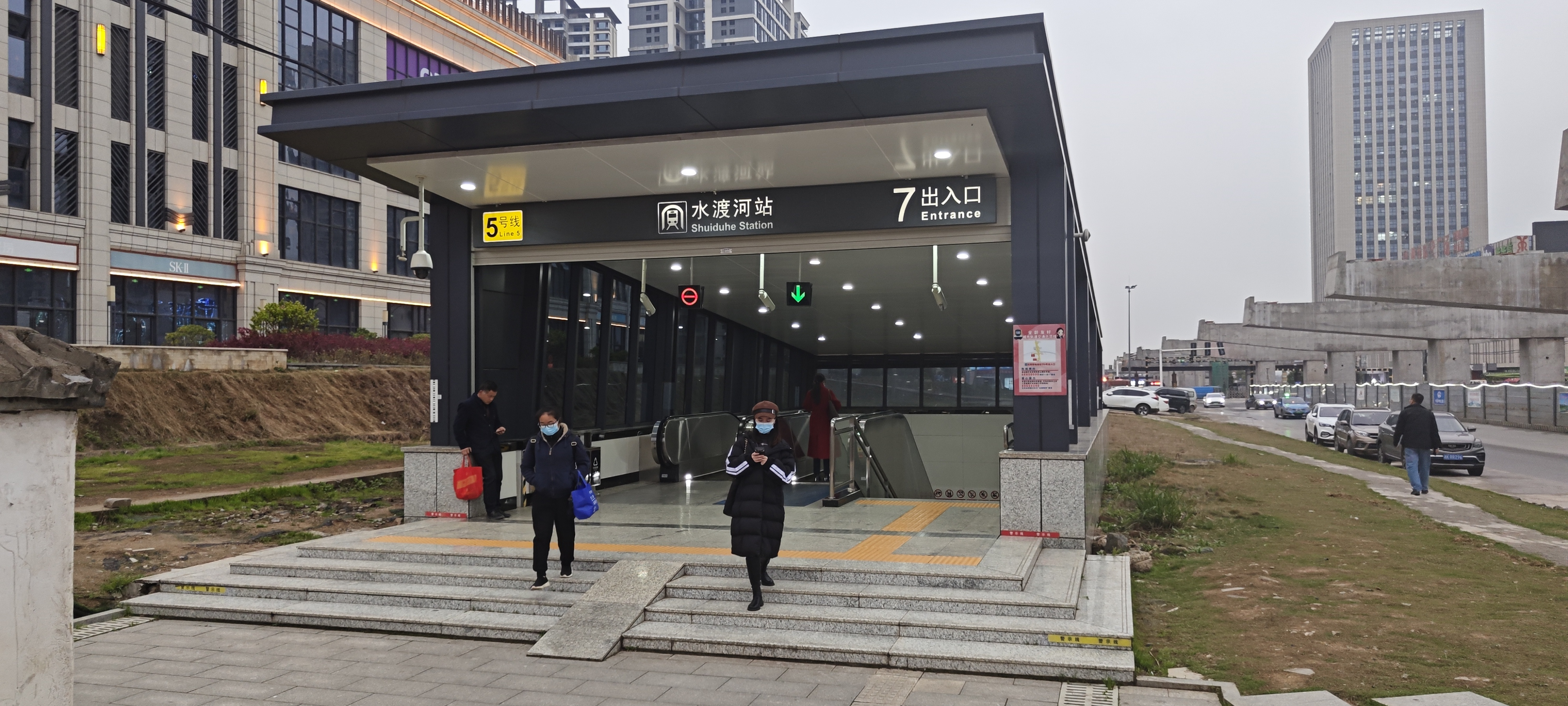
- Entrance 7

General information
- Location: Tianxin District, Changsha, Hunan; China
- Coordinates: 28°17′09″N 113°04′14″E
- Operated by: Changsha Metro
- Line(s): Line 5
- Platforms: 2 (1 island platform)

History
- Opened: 28 June 2020

Services
Preceding station	Changsha Metro	Following station
Tuqiao towards Maozhutang	Line 5	Terminus

Shuiduhe station (Chinese: 水渡河站; pinyin: Shuǐdùhé Zhàn) is a subway station in Tianxin District, Changsha, Hunan, China, operated by the Changsha subway operator Changsha Metro. It entered revenue service on 28 June 2020.

== History ==
The station started the test operation on 30 December 2019. The station opened on 28 June 2020.

== Surrounding area ==
- Hunan Vocational College of Engineering
