= Line 6 (Changsha Metro) =

Metro line in Changsha, China

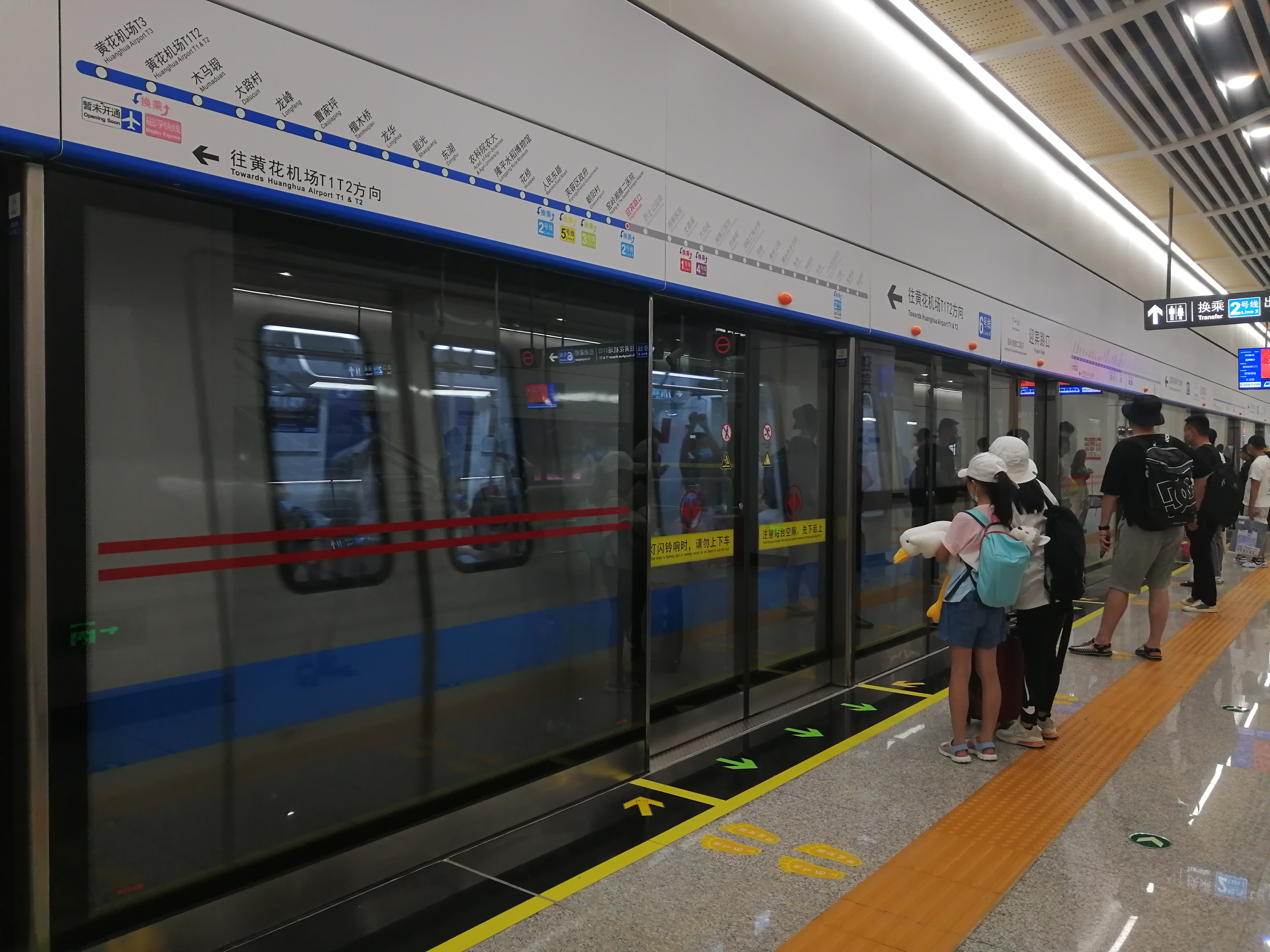
- Platform of Yingbin Road station

Overview
- Status: Operational
- Owner: Changsha Government
- Locale: Changsha, Hunan, China
- Termini: Xiejiaqiao; Huanghua Airport T1 & T2
- Stations: 34

Service
- Type: Rapid transit
- System: Changsha Metro
- Services: 1
- Operator(s): Changsha Shuicheng Rail Transit Co., Ltd; Guangzhou Metro Group Co., Ltd

History
- Opened: 28 June 2022; 4 years ago

Technical
- Line length: 48.11 km (29.89 mi)
- Number of tracks: 2
- Character: Underground
- Track gauge: 1,435 mm (4 ft 8 1/2 in)

Line 6 of the Changsha Metro (Chinese: 长沙地铁六号线; pinyin: Chǎngshā Dìtiě Liù Hào Xiàn) is a rapid transit line in Changsha, Hunan, China. The line opened on 28 June 2022, running 48.11 kilometres (29.89 mi) with 34 stations.. This is the first line of Changsha Metro system operating under PPP contract with 25-year tenure.

== History ==
Construction started on 28 December 2016 with estimated investment of 38.84 billion RMB. Test operations without passengers started in December 2021. Phase 1 of Line 6 opened on 28 June 2022.

== Opening timeline ==
Segment	Commencement	Length	Station(s)	Name
Xiejiaqiao — Huanghua Airport T1 & T2	28 June 2022	48.11 km (29.89 mi)	34	Phase 1

== Rolling stock ==
The line is operated using six-car Type A trains manufactured by CRRC Zhuzhou Locomotive, with a capacity for 2592 passengers. The maximum service speed of the trains is 80 km/h.

== Stations ==
Section	Station name		Connections	Distance km	Location
Section	English	Chinese	Connections	Distance km	Location
Phase 1
Phase 1	Xiejiaqiao	谢家桥			
Phase 1	Xiangbiwo	象鼻窝			
Phase 1	Zhongtang	中塘	2		
Phase 1	Hunan First Normal University (West Campus)	一师范西校区			
Phase 1	Changqing	长庆			
Phase 1	Hexinyuan	和馨园			
Phase 1	Changfeng	长丰			
Phase 1	Lugu Sports Park	麓谷体育公园			
Phase 1	Lugu Park	麓谷公园			
Phase 1	Jiantang	涧塘			
Phase 1	Hunan University of Technology and Business	湖南工商大学			
Phase 1	Baigezui	白鸽咀			
Phase 1	The Third Xiangya Hospital	湘雅三医院			
Phase 1	Liugoulong	六沟垅	4		
Phase 1	Wenchangge	文昌阁	1		
Phase 1	Xiangya Hospital	湘雅医院			
Phase 1	South Martyrs Park	烈士公园南			
Phase 1	Yingbin Road	迎宾路口	2		
Phase 1	Yaoling & The Second Xiangya Hospital	窑岭湘雅二医院	7		
Phase 1	Chaoyangcun	朝阳村	3		
Phase 1	Furong District Government	芙蓉区政府	5		
Phase 1	Renmin East Road	人民东路	2		
Phase 1	Huaqiao	花桥			
Phase 1	Longping Rice Museum	隆平水稻博物馆			
Phase 1	Acad. of Agri-Sciences & Agri-University	农科院农大			
Phase 1	Donghu	东湖			
Phase 1	Shaoguang	韶光			
Phase 1	Longhua	龙华			
Phase 1	Tanmuqiao	檀木桥			
Phase 1	Caojiaping	曹家坪			
Phase 1	Longfeng	龙峰			
Phase 1	Dalucun	大路村			
Phase 1	Mumaduan	木马塅			
Phase 1	Huanghua Airport T1 & T2	黄花机场T1T2	Maglev; CSX		
East extension	Huanghua Airport T3	黄花机场T3	CSX		
