= Furong District Government station =

Metro station in Changsha, China

Furong District Government station 芙蓉区政府站
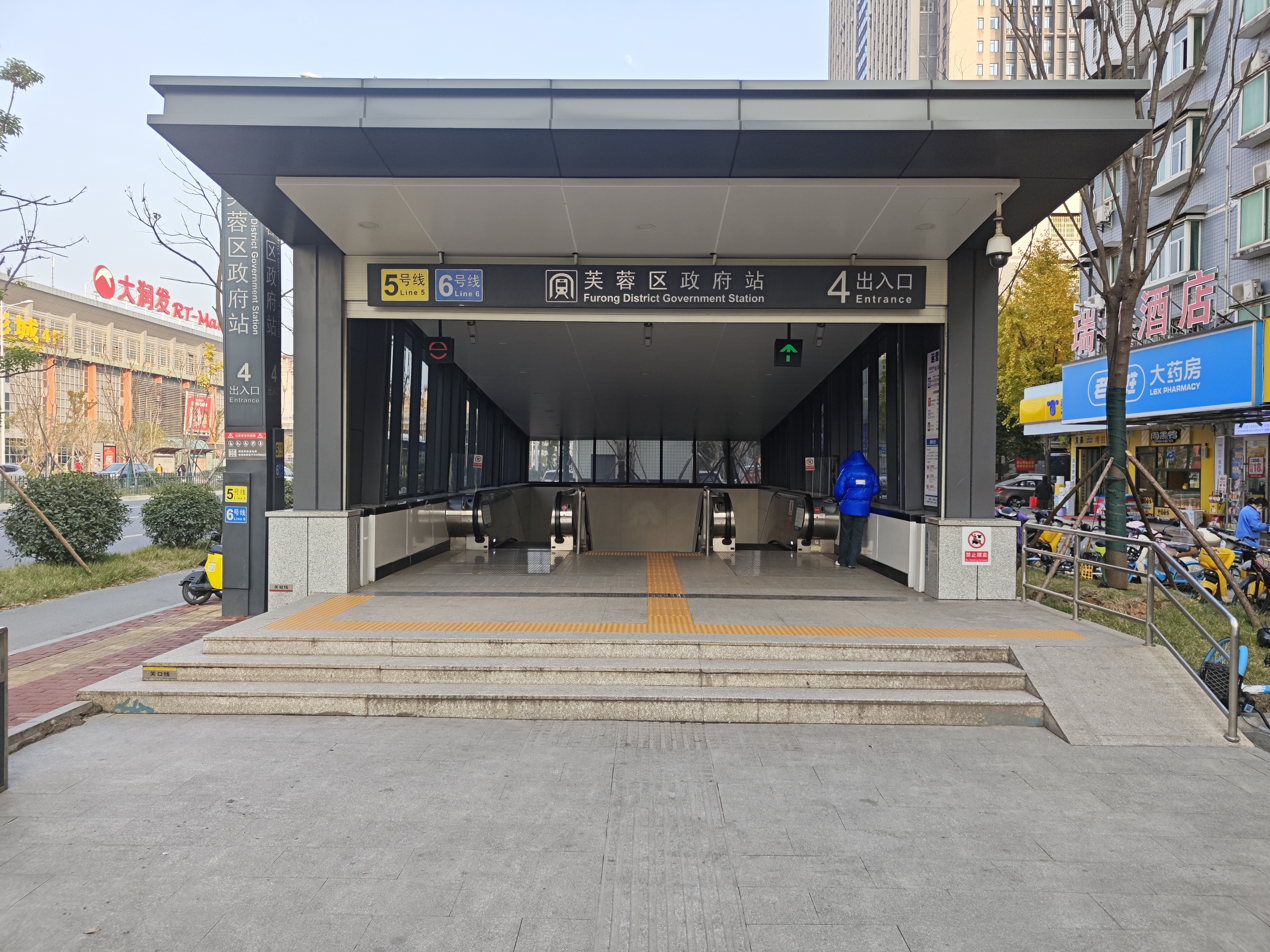
- Entrance 4

General information
- Location: Furong District, Changsha, Hunan; China
- Coordinates: 28°11′30″N 113°02′13″E
- Operator: Changsha Metro
- Lines: Line 5 Line 6
- Platforms: 4 (2 island platforms)

History
- Opened: 28 June 2020 (Line 5); 28 June 2022 (Line 6)

Services
Preceding station	Changsha Metro	Following station
North Gaoqiao towards Maozhutang	Line 5	Wanjiali Square towards Shuiduhe
Chaoyangcun towards Xiejiaqiao	Line 6	Renmin East Road towards Huanghua Airport T1 & T2
Location

Furong District Government station (Chinese: 芙蓉区政府站; pinyin: Fúróngqū Zhèngfǔ Zhàn) is a subway station in Furong District, Changsha, Hunan, China, operated by the Changsha subway operator Changsha Metro. It entered revenue service on 28 June 2020.

== History ==
The station started the test operation on 30 December 2019. The station opened on 28 June 2020. It later became an interchange on 28 June 2022 after the opening of Line 6.

== Surrounding area ==
- Furong District Government
