= Emiling station =

Metro station in Changsha, China

Emiling station 阿弥岭站
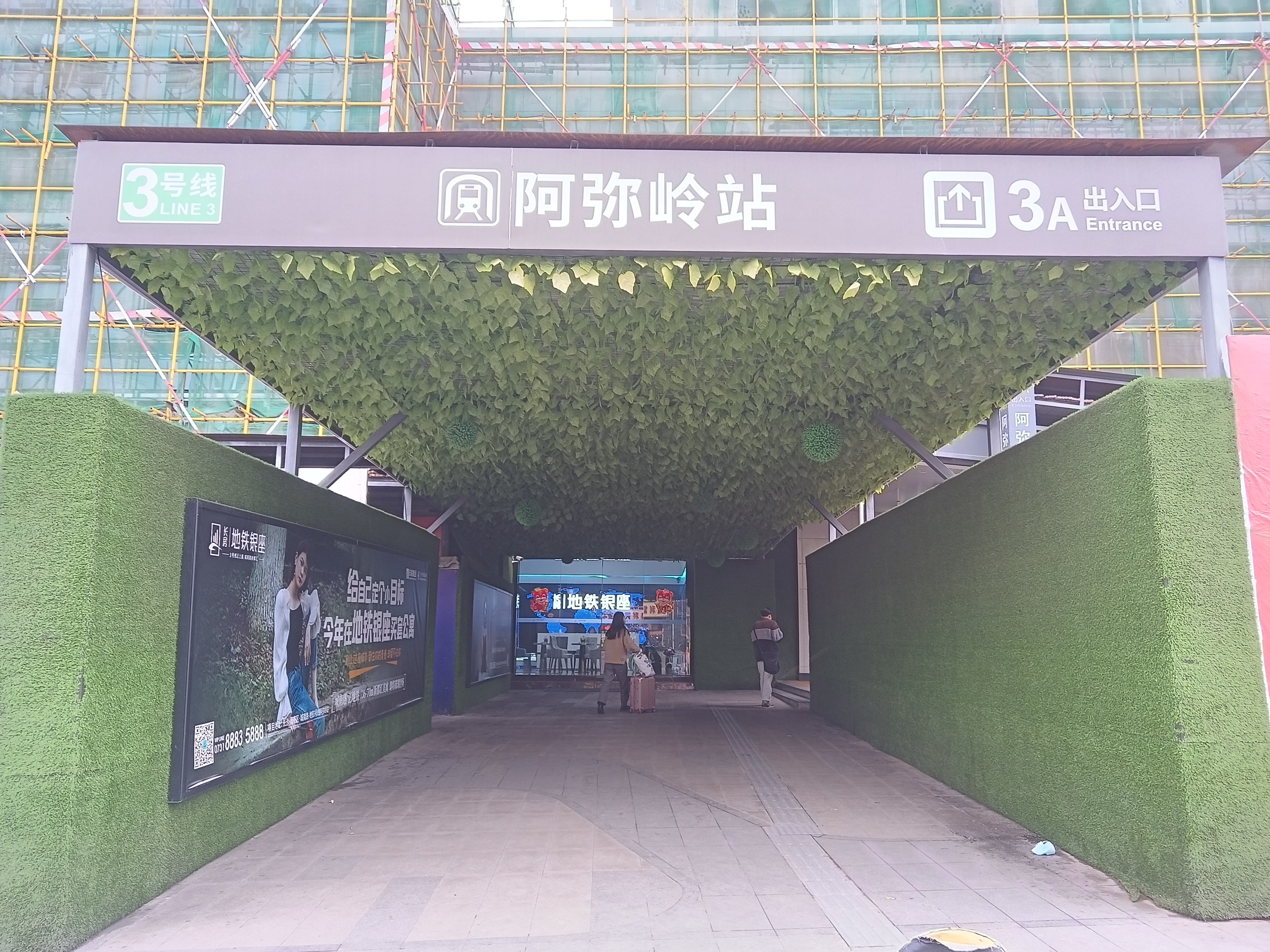
- Entrance 3A of Emiling Station

General information
- Location: Tianxin District, Changsha, Hunan; China
- Coordinates: 28°10′50″N 113°00′54″E
- Operated by: Changsha Metro
- Line(s): Line 3
- Platforms: 2 (1 island platform)

History
- Opened: 28 June 2020; 4 years ago

Services
Preceding station	Changsha Metro	Following station
Guihua Park towards Shantang	Line 3	Chaoyangcun towards Guangsheng

Emiling station (Chinese: 阿弥岭站; pinyin: ēmílǐng Zhàn) is a subway station in Tianxin District, Changsha, Hunan, China, operated by the Changsha subway operator Changsha Metro. It entered revenue service on 28 June 2020.

== History ==
The station started the test operation on 30 December 2019. The station opened on 28 June 2020.

== Surrounding area ==
- Guihuashu No.2 Primary School
- Hunan Uremia Association
