= Renmin East Road station =

Metro station in Changsha, China

Coordinates: 28°11′26″N 113°02′43″E

Renmin East Road 人民东路
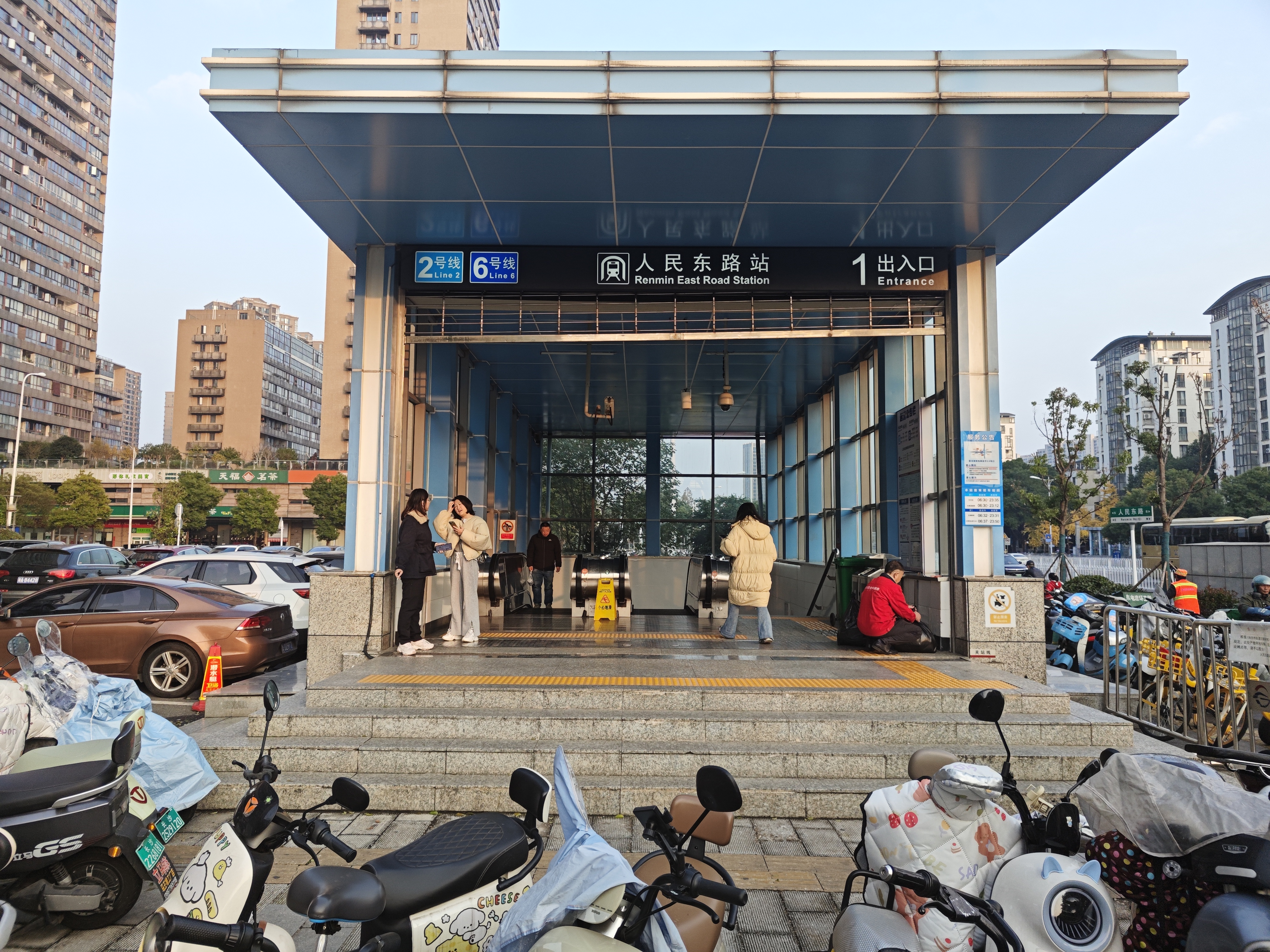
- Entrance 1

General information
- Location: Yuhua District, Changsha, Hunan; China
- Operator: Changsha Metro
- Lines: Line 2 Line 6
- Platforms: 4 (2 island platforms)

Other information
- Station code: 218

History
- Opened: 29 April 2014 (Line 2); 28 June 2022 (Line 6)

Services
Preceding station	Changsha Metro	Following station
Wanjiali Square towards Longhuling	Line 2	Changsha Avenue towards Guangda
Furong District Government towards Xiejiaqiao	Line 6	Huaqiao towards Huanghua Airport T1 & T2
Location

Renmin East Road station is a subway station in Changsha, Hunan, China, operated by the Changsha subway operator Changsha Metro. It serves Lines 2 and 6.

== Station layout ==
The station has two island platforms.

G		Exits
LG1	Concourse	Faregates, Station Agent
LG2	←	Line 2 towards West Meixi Lake (Wanjiali Square)
LG2	Island platform, doors open on the left
LG2		Line 2 towards Guangda (Changsha Avenue)	→
Transfer passage		To transfer 2 and 6
LG3	←	Line 6 towards Xiejiaqiao (Furong District Government)
LG3	Island platform, doors open on the left
LG3		Line 6 towards Huanghua Airport T1 & T2 (Huaqiao)	→

== History ==
The station opened on 29 April 2014. It later became an interchange on June 28, 2022 after the opening of Line 6.
