= Chaoyangcun station =

Metro station in Changsha, China

Chaoyangcun station 朝阳村站
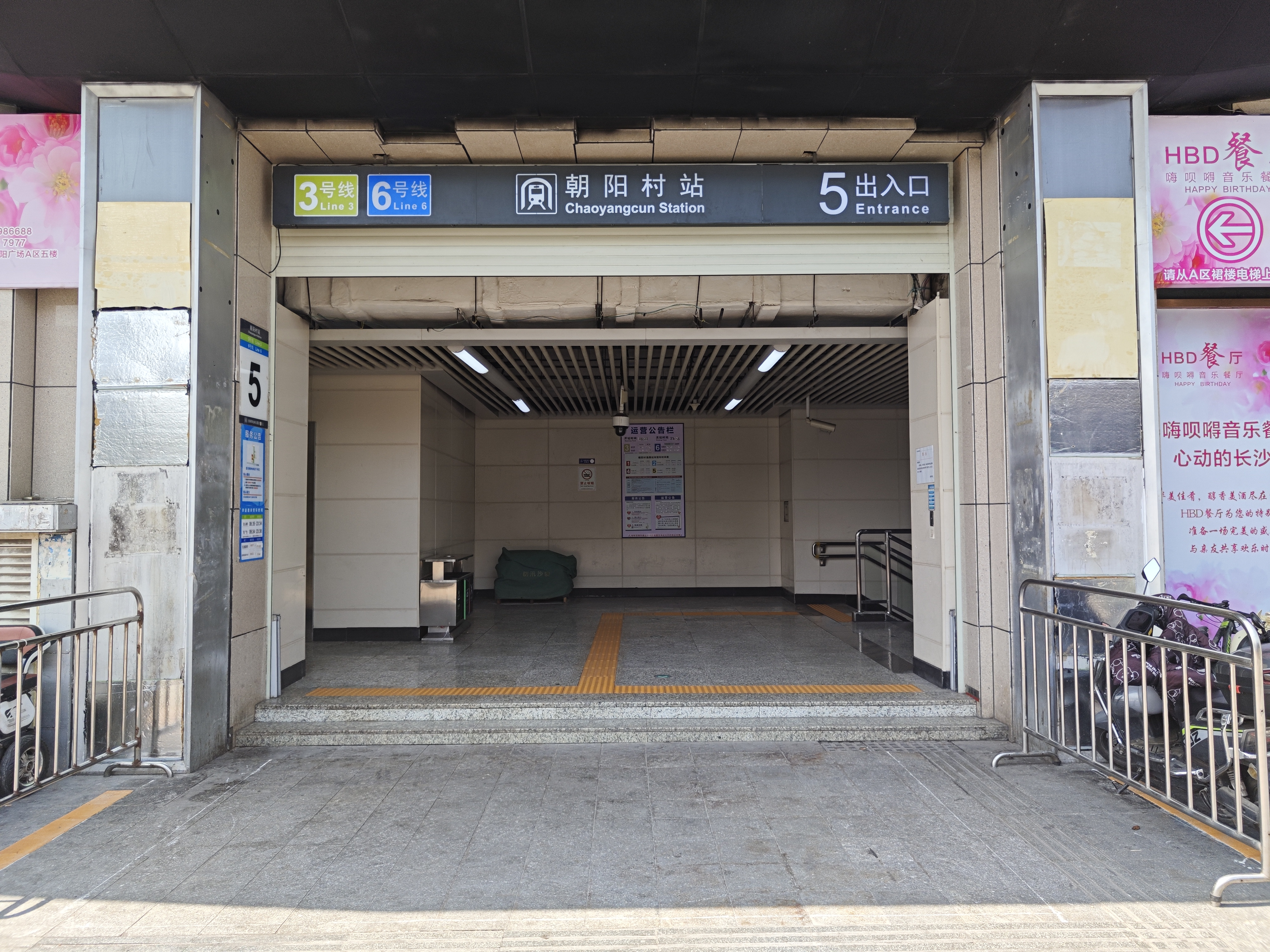
- Entrance 5

General information
- Location: Furong District, Changsha, Hunan; China
- Coordinates: 28°11′32″N 113°01′01″E
- Operator: Changsha Metro
- Lines: Line 3 Line 6
- Platforms: 4 (2 island platforms)

History
- Opened: 28 June 2020; 6 years ago (Line 3); 28 June 2022; 4 years ago (Line 6)

Services
Preceding station	Changsha Metro	Following station
Emiling towards Xiangtan North Railway Station	Line 3	Railway Station towards Guangsheng
Yaoling & The Second Xiangya Hospital towards Xiejiaqiao	Line 6	Furong District Government towards Huanghua Airport T1 & T2
Location

Chaoyangcun station (Chinese: 朝阳村站; pinyin: Cháoyángcūn Zhàn) is a subway station in Furong District, Changsha, Hunan, China, operated by the Changsha subway operator Changsha Metro. It entered revenue service on 28 June 2020.

== History ==
The station started the test operation on 30 December 2019. The station opened on 28 June 2020. It later became a subway interchange on June 28, 2022 after the opening of Line 6.

== Surrounding area ==
- Chaoyang School
