= Xiang embroidery =

Traditional embroidery style of Changsha, Hunan, China

Hunan embroidery, or Xiang embroidery, as one of the traditional folk arts of China, is regarded as one of the four most distinguished embroidery styles in China (along with Cantonese embroidery, Sichuan embroidery and Suzhou embroidery). It is a general name for the embroidery products which originate from and are mostly produced in Changsha, Hunan, with distinct characteristics of Chu culture. Hunan embroidery is particularly famous in embroidering with silk thread, and the patterns have a high sense of reality. In 2006, Hunan embroidery was included in the first set of contributions to the nation's intangible cultural heritage recognized by the State Council.

== History ==
Based on the embroidery unearthed from Chu tomb in 1958 in Changsha, Hunan, embroidery technology had developed to a certain extent in some localities of Hunan early, dating back to the Spring and Autumn period, over 2,500 years ago. The forty pieces of embroidered garments excavated from Mawangdui Han Tomb in Changsha in 1972 also showed the excellence of the embroidery technology in areas of Hunan during the Western Han Dynasty around 2,100 years ago. In the years following, Xiang Embroidery gradually cultivated its simple and graceful style.

In the 24th year of Emperor Gangxu's reign (1898), Wu Hancheng, son of the embroiderer Hu Lianxian, established in Changsha the first embroidery workshop, named “Wu Caixia Embroidery Workshop” with its products self-produced and self-marketed. Thanks to the embroideries produced there, Xiang embroidery spread and made its name throughout the nation. At the end of Guangxu period, the folk art of Xiang Embroidery developed a particular embroidery system and became the incubator of market-oriented handicrafts with strong local characteristics of the Hunan area, different from other types of embroidery. Since then, the term “Xiang Embroidery” has taken off and become widely used.

The book of Changsha County, written in the Tongzhi period of late Qing Dynasty, said, “In the provincial capital, women prefer embroidering to spinning, and the powerful or rich families highly praise and give great honor to embroidery.” Changsha County is the traditional base of Xiang embroidery with the name of “Home of Xiang Embroidery”, where the majority of peasant women work in embroidery. By the end of the Qing Dynasty, the number of embroidery workshops had increased to 26 in Changsha County, the number of embroidery craftspeople had reached the tens of thousands, and the annual output of embroideries exceeded 20,000 pieces. Most of these pieces were used as daily necessities, such as quilt sheets or pillowcases, with a minority being finer pieces, such as high quality screen covers.

In the 1930s, the production value of Xiang Embroidery could reach up to 800,000 silver dollars, and a third of pieces were exported abroad. During the decades after liberation, Xiang Embroidery achieved remarkable progress and was included into the list of “the four famous Chinese embroideries”, due to its unique style and remarkable double-sided embroidery technology. It has also become an artistic calling card for Hunan province, and even China as a nation, with an annual total export of $5 million US dollars.

== Characteristics ==
The use of different shades of grey, black, and white in Xiang Embroidery, together with natural chiaroscuro, creates a strong sense of texture and stereoscopic effect. Meanwhile, the juxtaposition of positive and negative space in the embroidery's structure serves to highlight the subject. In addition, by borrowing techniques from traditional painting, Xiang Embroidery plays with the bounds of embroidery. The overall effect is that of a realistic, bright, and simple style strongly affected by the local culture of Hunan while also carrying the simplicity and elegance of Chinese wash painting.

=== Thread ===
Xiang embroidery uses pure silk, hard satin, soft satin, transparent gauze and nylon as its materials as well as a variety of colorful silk threads. Traditional Xiang Embroidery uses threads in a very distinctive way—the thread is firstly boiled with Gleditsia and then wiped with bamboo paper, which prevents the thread from pilling and thus is convenient for embroidering. In Xiang Embroidery, there is a special type of thread—in one thread dyed one color with different shades of that color, by which the sfumato effect can be presented after the embroidering finished. In addition, Xiang Embroidery is also renowned for its careful thread splitting technique, making the thread as thin as hair. And people call the embroidery using this kind of thread “Yang Mao Xi Xiu”.

=== Stitch ===
There are 72 types of stitches in traditional Xiang Embroidery including You stitch, Mao stitch, Peng hair stitch, Qi stitch, Ping stitch(flatting stitch), Wang stitch, Dazi stitch, random stitch and Gold Wire stitch, etc. and they can be divided into five major types: flat embroidery, brocade embroidery, mesh embroidery, twist embroidery and knot embroidery.

=== Subject ===
In Xiang Embroidery, Landscape, animals and characters are common subjects, and the peonies, tigers, cats, dogs and dragons are the most representative designs characterized by rich changes in the layering of the colors and the high sense of painting. Embroidering landscape is relatively easier than embroidering animals, but characters are the most difficult ones to embroider with its higher requirements for the density of the thread, furthermore, it’s not easy to capture the characters’expression.

The expression “Su Embroidery’s cats and Xiang Embroidery’s tigers” circulated in the folk is a high praise for the excellence of Su Embroidery in embroidering the animal cats and Xaing Embroidery in tigers.

=== Use ===
Xiang embroidery crafts include valuable works of art, as well as materials for daily use, such as screens, quilt sheets, pillowcases, back cushions, tablecloths, handkerchiefs, embroidered shoes, etc.

== Achievements ==
Xiang Embroidery attracts people both at home and abroad. Xiang Embroidery was praised “the threads have flawlessly and fluently covered the sketches”at the Nanyang Industrial Exposition in Nanjing In 1910. In 1915, Xiang Embroidery works won 4 more medals at the Panama Expo held in San Francisco, America. In the 1930s, the portrait of Franklin D. Roosevelt embroidered by the Xiang Embroidery artist, Yang Peizhen, was sent as a personal present to President Roosevelt and is still now being showcased in the “Little White House” museum, an exhibition for the life story of Franklin D. Roosevelt, in Atlanta, Georgia, in the southeast of the US.

Inheriting the traditional embroidery craftsmanship, Xiang Embroidery has made another breakthrough and created a sophisticated new type of embroidery: the Double-sided disparate embroidery, that is, in one piece of cloth, while one side of the embroidery is finished, the other side is simultaneously completed but with different colors or designs. In that sense, there is no such a thing as the obverse side or the reverse side since both sides depict a thing. The representative splendid works of this type have Lady Yang, Hua Mulan, Viewing the Moon

Because of continuous dedication to Xiang Embroidery, Xiang Embroidery has moved towards a decorative art and collection art from the practical art of living, and is often chosen as good presents which indicate the workmanship level and carry the culture of the place creates it.

== Exhibition ==
To protect and inherit the national intangible cultural heritage and revitalize the Xiang embroidery industry, Mr. Mao yongzhen, the chairman of TianLi Xiang Embroidery Co. Limited, established the Shaping Xiang Embroidery Museum in Hunan. It is conferred “the first batch of civilian-run museums in Hunan” by the Hunan Provincial Administration of Cultural Heritage, that is, it is the first private supporting museum for the Xiang Embroidery industry in Huan. The establishment of the museum was planned in 2006 and wasn’t completed until 2010. Its predecessor was WuyiRoad TianLi Xiang Embroidery Art Gallery. The museum has now been rebuilt on the northwest corner of Xiang Embroidery Cultural Square and has been open to the public since May 18, 2010.

== See also ==
- Embroidery City
