= Hunan Mass Media Vocational and Technical College =

College in Changsha, Hunan, China

Coordinates: 28°15′21″N 113°04′42″E

Hunan Mass Media Vocational and Technical College (simplified Chinese: 湖南大众传媒职业技术学院; traditional Chinese: 湖南大眾傳媒職業技術學院; pinyin: Húnán Dàzhòng Chuánmeí Zhíyè Jìshù Xuéyuàn) is a college located in Changsha, Hunan, China.

As of fall 2013, the college has 3 campuses, a combined student body of 9600 students.

== History ==
The college was founded in 1949 in Changsha, Hunan. In 1969, during the Cultural Revolution, the college closed and reopened in 1979. In 2000, Hunan Bank College (湖南银行干校) merged into the college.

== Schools and departments ==
The college consists of 9 departments and 32 specialties. At present, the university has 5 research institutions and research centres.

- Department of Host and Broadcast
- Department of Network Media
- Department of Film and Television Art
- Department of Cartoon Art
- Department of Applied Art
- Department of Radio and Television Media
- Department of International Communication
- Department of Paper Media
- Department of Economic Management

== Culture ==
- Motto: Mingde Boxue and Qiushi Zhiyuan (明德博学，求是致远)
- College newspaper: Journal of Hunan Mass Media Vocational Technical College (《湖南大众传媒职业技术学院学报》), founded in 2001.

== Affiliated schools ==
- Xingsha Teacher Training School (星沙教师进修学校)
- Xingsha Experimental School (星沙实验小学)

== Notable alumni ==
- Cao Yi (曹异)
- Chen Tao (陈涛)
- Deng Haiming (邓海明)
- Du Haitao (杜海涛)
- Gu Xiaojing (古晓靖)
- Hua Hongguang (花洪广)
- Huang Rui (黄锐)
- Jiang Hongjie (蒋红杰)
- Li Chi (李驰)
- Li Hao (李好)
- Li Hong (李红)
- Liang Lan (梁蓝)
- Liu Diyang (刘迪洋)
- Liu Jixian (刘吉娴)
- Liu Nian (刘念)
- Jin Xiaolin (金晓琳)
- Qiu Xiao (仇晓)
- Qu Youyuan (瞿优远)
- Ren Wei (仁炜)
- Wang Han (汪涵)
- Wang Yan (王燕)
- Wei Zhe (魏哲)
- Xie Hong (谢红)
- Xu Jing (许静)
- You Yizhou (游一舟)
- Zheng Huilin (郑慧琳)

== Gallery ==
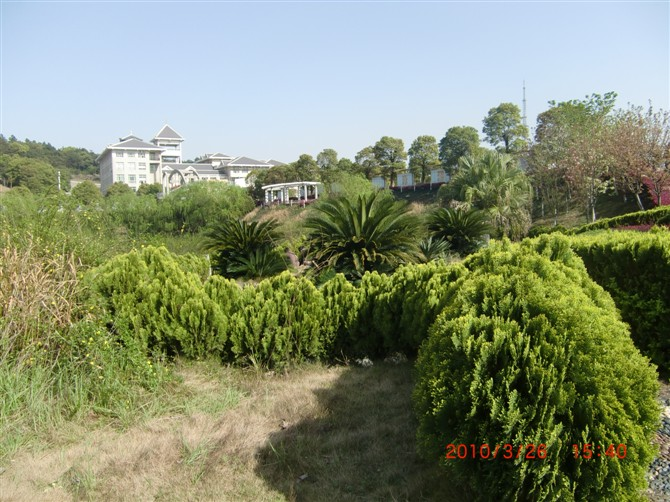

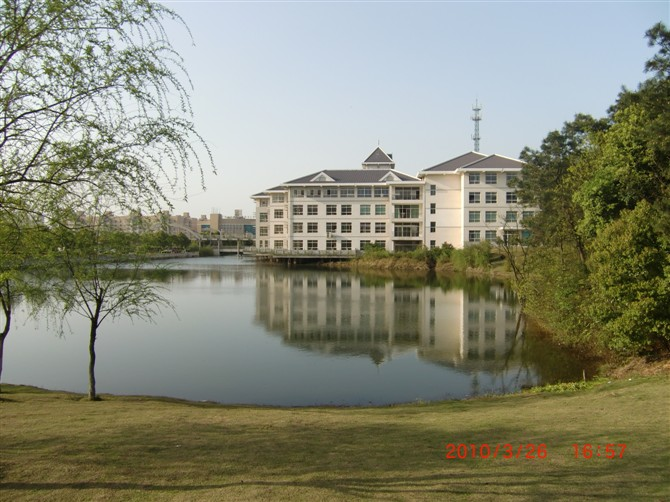

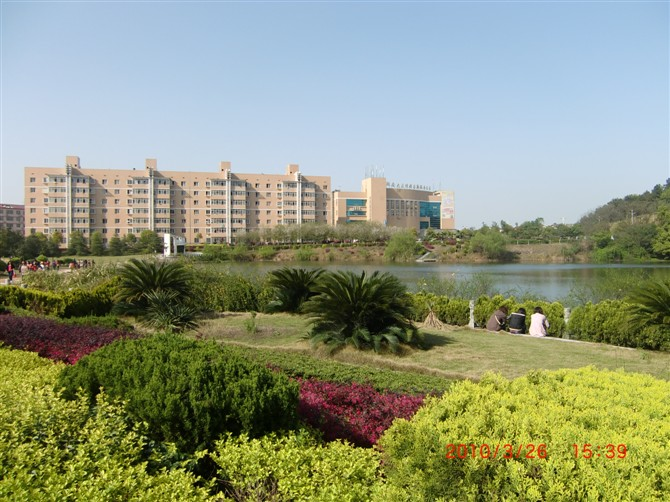

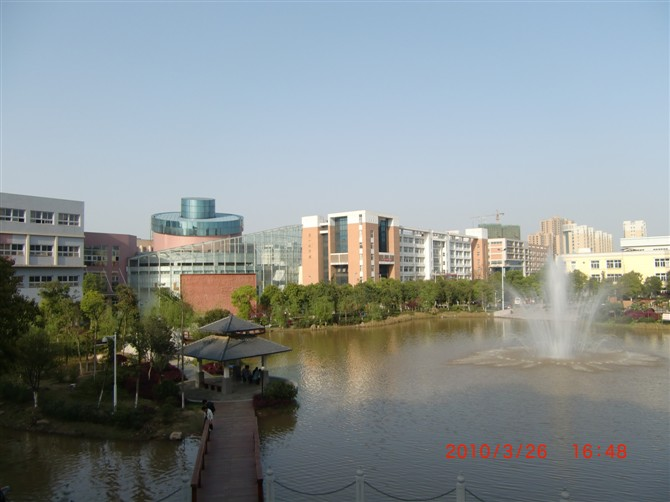

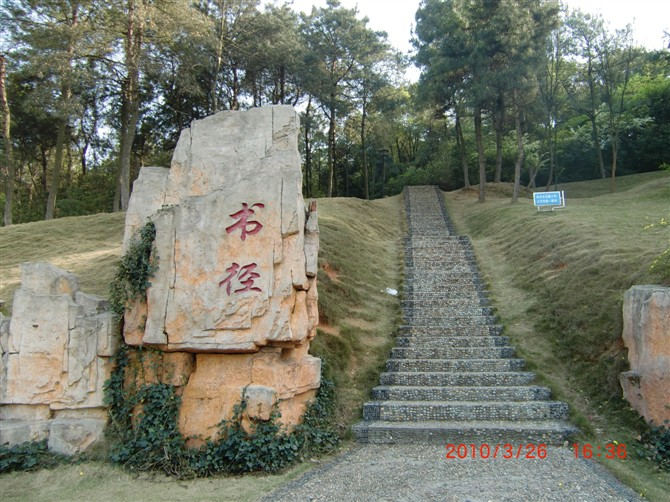

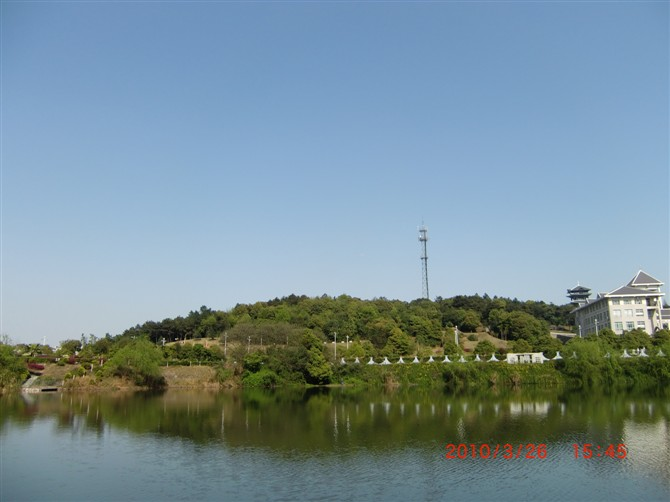

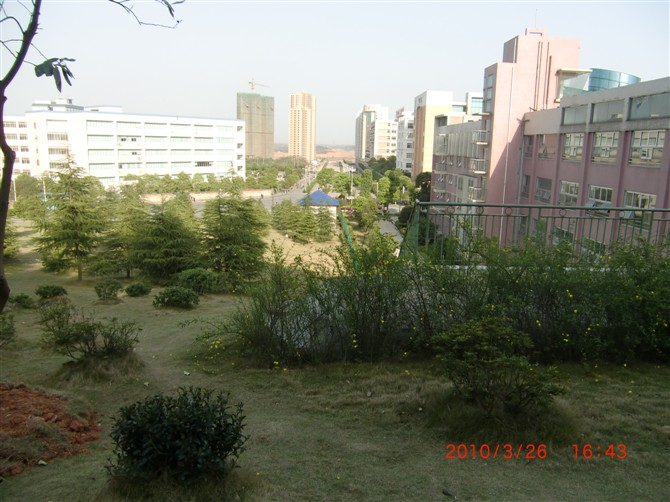
