= Zhao Wendi =

Chinese association football player

Personal information
- Date of birth: 15 October 2001 (age 25)
- Place of birth: Changsha, Hunan, China
- Height: 1.73 m (5 ft 8 in)
- Position: Forward

Team information
- Current team: Nantong Zhiyun
- Number: 19

Youth career
- –2019: Shanghai Shenxin
- 2020–2021: Nantong Zhiyun

Senior career*
Years	Team	Apps	(Gls)
2021–	Nantong Zhiyun	9	(0)
- * Club domestic league appearances and goals as of 14:01, 31 December 2022 (UTC)

Zhao Wendi (Chinese: 赵文荻; born 15 October 2001) is a Chinese footballer currently playing as a forward for Nantong Zhiyun.

== Club career ==
Zhao Wendi would be promoted to the senior team of Nantong Zhiyun for the beginning of the 2021 China League One season. He would go on to make his debut in a league game on 25 April 2021 against Nanjing City in a 1-1 draw. He would go on to establish himself as a squad player within the team and helped the club gain promotion to the top tier at the end of the 2022 China League One season.

== Career statistics ==
As of 31 December 2022.

Club	Season	League			Cup		Continental		Other		Total	
Club	Season	Division	Apps	Goals	Apps	Goals	Apps	Goals	Apps	Goals	Apps	Goals
Nantong Zhiyun	2021	China League One	9	0	1	0	–		–		10	0
Nantong Zhiyun	2022	China League One	0	0	1	0	–		–		1	0
Nantong Zhiyun	Total		9	0	2	0	0	0	0	0	11	0
Career total			9	0	2	0	0	0	0	0	11	0
