= 1938 Changsha fire =

Fire during the Sino-Japanese War

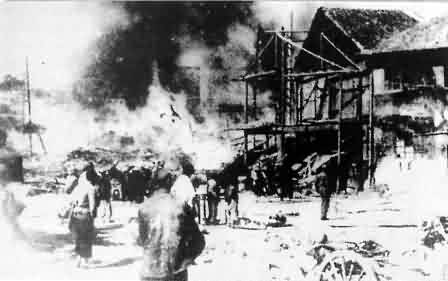
- Wenxi Fire
- Date: November 13, 1938; 02:00 – November 18, 1938
- Location: Changsha city in the Republic of China

Impacts
- Deaths: 30,000
- Structures destroyed: 56,000
- Cost: $1 billion

Ignition
- Perpetrator: Kuomintang officials
- Motive: To prevent wealth from falling to the Japanese

The Changsha fire of 1938 (Chinese: 長沙大火), also known as Wenxi fire (Chinese: 文夕大火), was the greatest human-caused urban conflagration in Chinese history. Kuomintang officials ordered the city be set on fire in 1938 during the Second Sino-Japanese War to prevent the Japanese from benefiting from its capture. The result of this fire made Changsha one of the most damaged cities during World War II, alongside Stalingrad, Hiroshima, Nagasaki, Tokyo, Dresden, Warsaw and others.

== Background ==
On October 25, 1938, the city of Wuhan fell to the Empire of Japan. Soon after, a great number of refugees and injured soldiers, in addition to government institutions and factories, were relocated to Changsha. This caused a population boom in the city, and the number of residents jumped from 300,000 to more than 500,000. Though the city had prepared for such a scenario for a long time, due to the limited transport capacity of Changsha, it still could not hold this amount of goods and people.

On November 8, the Imperial Japanese Army entered northern Hunan. On the 11th, Yueyang fell. Soon, Chinese and Japanese armies faced off along the Xinqiang River just outside Changsha. The situation in the city became increasingly tense.

False intelligence contended that Imperial Japanese forces would attack Changsha from the East. Chiang had already given a speech in Changsha about burning the city if it ever risked being captured. Because of a lack of confidence in holding the city, Chiang Kai-shek suggested that the city should be burned to the ground, so that Japan would gain nothing even if it chose to forcefully enter it. On November 10 (some say the 12th), the chairman of the Hunan government, Zhang Zhizhong, passed Chiang's idea to his subordinates in a meeting. An arson team was immediately organized. The team was dispatched to every part of the city and was ordered to set the fire once a signal fire was set off on the top of Tianxin Building in the southwest of Changsha.

== Events ==
At around 2 o'clock in the morning of November 13, 1938, there was a fire in a military hospital just outside the South Gate (to this day, it remains a mystery whether the fire was a signal or an accident). The arson team took it as a signal and started to set the fire at 2 o'clock in the morning. The burning lasted for five days, also destroying several 2,500-year-old historical antiques. City residents tried their best to escape, resulting in a severe boat accident at a river ford on the Xiang River.

== Damage ==
More than 30,000 people lost their lives during the fire. Over 90%, or 56,000, of the city's buildings were burned. The fire also disabled commercial trading, academic institutions and government organizations throughout the city. The fire cost a total economic loss of $1 billion, which accounted for 43% of the total output of the city. Government institutions that were destroyed include the provincial government headquarters, buildings housing the bureaus of civil affairs, construction, police, army mobilizations, security, telegraph, telephone, post as well as the courts, Kuomintang branches, chamber of commerce, central news agency, central radio station and several newspaper offices. More than 31 schools, including Hunan University, were also burned down. Banks destroyed include the Bank of Hunan, Bank of Shanghai, Jiaotong Bank and Bank of China. More than 40 factories were burned. The one that suffered the most was the First Textiles Factory of Hunan. The damage to this factory include $270,000 loss due to burned workshops; $960,000 to raw materials; $600,000 to machinery. Of the city's 190 rice mills and storage buildings, only 12 survived the fire. More than $2 million, or about 80% of the total, were lost in the silk industry. Forty Hunan embroidery factories were completely destroyed. Except for the Hsiangya Hospital, every hospital in Changsha was burned to ground.

Future Chinese leaders such as Zhou Enlai and Ye Jianying were also present in the city during the fire. A verbal description of the fire was written by Guo Moruo, who also happened to be in Changsha during the fire.

== Aftermath ==
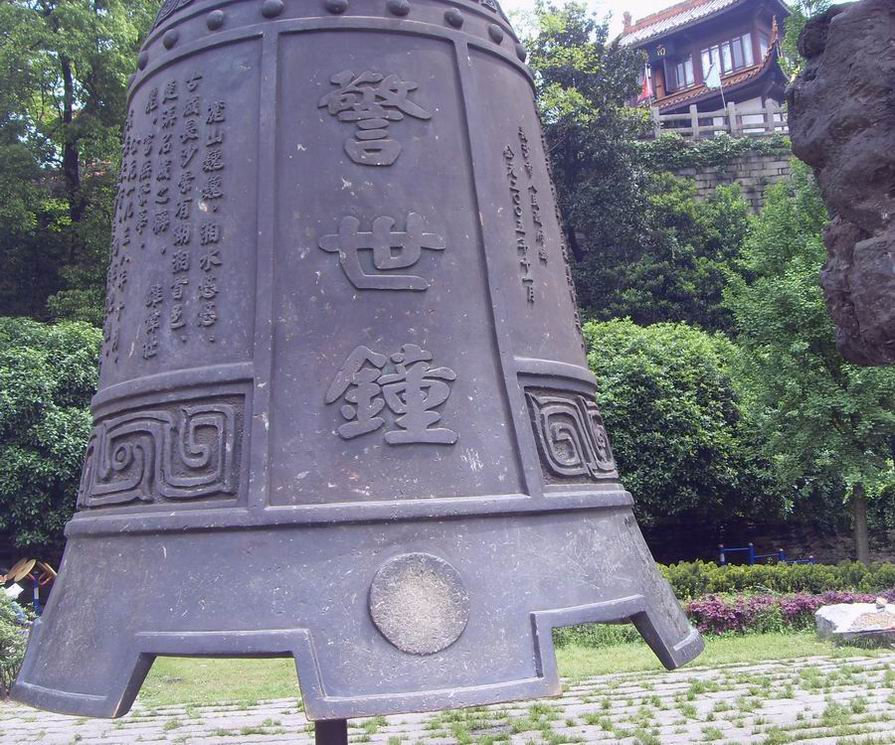
The alarming bell of the fire

On November 18, Chiang Kai-shek ordered the executions of three accused in the case. Zhang Zhizhong, the chairman of the Hunan government, also subsequently resigned.

On November 19, on the ruins of Changsha, food markets returned. By that time, there were 3 people selling meat and 2 selling vegetables.

The Bell Tower and the Xiangya Hospital survived the fire.

Chiang's fear proved wrong. The city repulsed three separate attacks by the Japanese in 1939, 1941 and 1942. The city did not fall until 1944 to the Japanese in the fourth battle of Changsha, although by that time the city no longer held strategic importance.

In July 2005, the first memorial commemorating the event in Changsha, a memorial wall on an old lamp company site, was built. The memorial wall is located on the bank of the Xiang River. In the same year, there was also a huge alarm clock carving erected as a tribute to the fire.

== Lost history ==
Before the fire, Changsha was one of China's few major cities that had not moved its site in 2,000 years. The fire, however, annihilated all the cultural accumulations that the city retained since the Spring and Autumn period.

== See also ==
- 1938 Yellow River flood
