= Tao Wang (economist) =

Chinese economist

Wang Tao (Chinese: 汪涛; pinyin: Wāng Tāo; born in Changsha, Hunan) is a Chinese economist and expert on the Chinese economy, and author of the 2023 book Making Sense of the Chinese Economy. She is currently managing director, chief China economist and head of Asia economic research at UBS Investment Bank. She served on the Mainland Opportunities Committee of the Hong Kong Financial Services Development Council from 2016 to 2021, and is a member of the Chief China Economist Forum.

== Education ==
Wang earned her bachelor's degree in International Economics from Renmin University of China, and her PhD in economics from New York University (NYU). Her dissertation at NYU was an econometric study of economic policies, foreign investment and industrial growth across Chinese cities. She later served as an adjunct professor at her alma mater, Renmin University, in 2004.

== Career ==
In 1994, Wang joined DRI/McGraw-Hill as a senior Asia economist covering East Asia. In 1997 she joined the IMF in Washington DC. Wang moved to the private sector in 2006, first as the head of Asia economics at BP, then as head of greater China economics and strategy at Bank of America.

She joined UBS in 2008 as the chief China economist. She has been a managing director since 2010 and head of Asia economics since 2016. At UBS, Wang's China and Asia economics team has ranked highly in multiple Institutional Investor All-Asia Research and All-China surveys. Her research covers topics such as China's long-term growth, state-owned enterprise reform, property bubbles, RMB internationalization, supply chain shifts, financial system risk, and monetary policy. Her team has been praised for being "really good on the big calls and where the Asian economies are headed", and for "looking at the facts rather than just repeating popular sentiment and news flow".

== Economic views ==
Wang has written research reports on China's debt issue. In 2014, she pointed out the risk of the rapid increase in debt level and the rise in shadow banking, but did not believe that the shadow credit crunch was leading to a Minsky moment. In April 2015, she attended Premier Li Keqiang's Expert Forum, where she suggested that China's real interest rate was too high, and that issuing local government debt swap can help improve debt sustainability.

Wang writes as a columnist for Caixin, and has been quoted by The New York Times, The Wall Street Journal, Financial Times, The Economist, and South China Morning Post. She has appeared on Bloomberg, CNBC, CCTV, and Phoenix TV.

== Publications ==
In 2023, her book Making Sense of China's Economy was published. The book takes readers through China's complex economic structure and lays out a historical framework for the key features and issues faced by the country. It was included in the Financial Times list of the best economics books of 2023 by economics commentator Martin Wolf, who labeled the book "indispensable" for those trying to understand the Chinese economy.

Partial list of published work:

- Wei, Shang-Jin; Wang, Tao (March 1997). "The siamese twins: Do state-owned banks favor state-owned enterprises in China?". China Economic Review. 8 (1): 19–29. doi:10.1016/S1043-951X(97)90010-9.
- Wang, Tao. "Exchange Rate Dynamics". China's Growth and Integration into the World Economy. Ed. Prasad, Eswar. IMF Occasional Paper 232, 2004, pp. 21–28. https://www.imf.org/external/np/seminars/eng/2014/pbc/pdf/Book070214.pdf
- Kuijs, Louis and Tao Wang. "China's Pattern of Growth: Moving to Sustainability and Reducing Inequality". World Bank Policy Research Working Paper No. 3767, November 2005. https://ssrn.com/abstract=849385
- Wang, Tao (December 2005). "Sources of real exchange rate fluctuations in China". Journal of Comparative Economics. 33 (4): 753–771. doi:10.1016/j.jce.2005.07.001.
- Wang, Tao. "How Much is the RMB Undervalued?". New Finance, August 2010. https://xueshu.baidu.com/usercenter/paper/show?paperid=9f1d7e2e18f00ec1cf506a9c260f5f08&site=xueshu_se
- Wang, Tao. "China's Evolving Monetary Policy Framework". New Issues in Monetary Policy. Ed. Guo, Kai and Alfred Schipke. PBC and IMF Joint Conference, March 2014, pp. 28–30. https://www.imf.org/external/np/seminars/eng/2014/pbc/pdf/Book070214.pdf
- Wang, Tao (2020). "Monetary Policy Instruments". The Handbook of China's Financial System. pp. 63–86. doi:10.1515/9780691205847-005. ISBN 978-0-691-20584-7. S2CID 240757045.
- Wang, Tao. "How to Measure the Magnitude of Anti-Covid Policy Support". PKU Financial Review, May 2020.
- Wang, Tao (2023). Making Sense of China's Economy (1 ed.). Routledge. ISBN 9781032317045. https://www.routledge.com/Making-Sense-of-Chinas-Economy/Wang/p/book/9781032317045?srsltid=AfmBOoo1LLx-tBD5pJyBHIyqMGUrZ1Pk719r1XWkM9zRL_9KgRYLwQ3U
