= Changsha Meixihu International Culture and Arts Centre =

Cultural complex in Changsha, Hunan, China

- 梅溪湖國際文化藝術中心
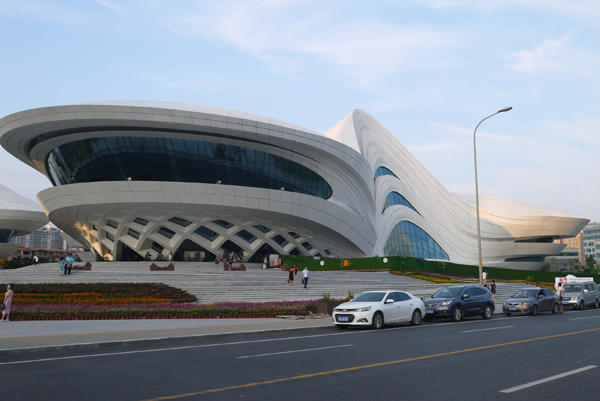
- Building exterior
- Interactive map of the Changsha Meixihu International Culture and Arts Centre area

General information
- Status: Completed
- Architectural style: Neo-futurism
- Location: Changsha, Hunan, China
- Construction started: 2012
- Completed: 2019

Design and construction
- Architects: Zaha Hadid, Patrick Schumacher
- Architecture firm: Zaha Hadid Architects

The Changsha Meixihu International Culture and Arts Centre (Chinese: 梅溪湖國際文化藝術中心) is a cultural complex located in the Meixihu subdistrict of Changsha, Hunan, China. It was completed in 2019. The complex was designed by British architectural firm Zaha Hadid Architects.

== Design ==
The complex contains three separate cultural institutions: a theatre, a contemporary art museum (MICA), and a multi-purpose venue. It has a total floor area of 115,000 square metres. The design of the complex is characteristic of Zaha Hadid Architect's neo-futurist style. The exterior of the buildings are dominated by sweeping white-tiled curves.

The theatre, known as the Grand Theatre, is the largest building in the complex. It provides all front-of-house functions in lobbies, bars, and hospitality suites, as well as ancillary functions including administration offices, rehearsal studios, backstage logistics, wardrobe, and dressing rooms. The theatre has a capacity of 1800 seats.

The MICA art museum contains an atrium for large-scale installations and events, and has dedicated spaces for community workshops, a lecture theatre, a café, and a museum shop. The multi-purpose venue has a capacity of 500 seats.

Two pedestrian bridges connect the complex to Festival Island, a linear islet located in Meixi Lake.

== Transport ==
The complex is connected to line 2 of the Changsha Metro.
