= Huang Zuqia =

Chinese theoretical and nuclear physicist

Huang Zuqia (Chinese: 黄祖洽; October 2, 1924 – September 7, 2014) was a Chinese theoretical and nuclear physicist, born in Changsha, Hunan province who was elected as a member of the Chinese Academy of Sciences in 1980. He made significant contributions to the theoretical design of China's hydrogen bombs.
