= John Cao =

- Born: Cao Sanqiang; 1959 (age 66–67); Hunan, China
- Other name: 曹三强
- Occupations: Pastor, Missionary, and Humanitarian Worker
- Spouse: Jamie Powell (m. 1988)

John Shanqiang Cao, (born 3 May 1959) is a Protestant Pastor. Born in Changsha, Hunan. He's best known for decades of house-church ministry and humanitarian work and he founded approximately 22 Bible-based English schools in China, as well as a drug rehab centre, which assisted over 2,000 poor children in Myanmar's Wa State near the China border.

== Arrest and imprisonment ==
On 5 March 2017, Chinese authorities detained Cao at a ferry landing in Menglian County, Yunnan, as he returned from Myanmar's Wa State with a fellow Christian teacher; others crossing at the same time were not stopped. He was formally arrested on 28 March 2017. The initial charge of illegal border crossing was later changed to organising illegal border crossings.

On 22 March 2018 the Menglian County People's Court sentenced him to seven years imprisonment and a 20,000 yuan fine. The Pu’er Intermediate People's Court upheld the conviction and sentence on 25 July 2019.

The UN Working Group on Arbitrary Detention later found the detention arbitrary and concluded he had been targeted because of his Christian faith and China maintained the case was solely about border crossings. He completed the full sentence and was released in March 2024.

After his release and cancer diagnosis in 2026, many Christian's have appealed to allow him to return from China.

== Personal life ==
He married his wife, Jamie Powell, in 1988.

In 2026, Cao had revealed he had stage 4 prostate cancer which had now spread to his spine.
