= Biological Industries =

Biological Industries is an Israel multinational, chemicals and biotechnology company, headquartered in Israel, with R&D and scientific training centers in Europe and the United States. The company provides product development and cell culture services to the pharmaceutical and biological industries, including custom manufacturing of biopharmaceuticals, and custom cell culture media formulations.

== History ==
Biological Industries (BI) was founded in 1982 in the northern Kibbutz Beit Haemek, Israel. The company has expanded in the United States through joint ownership owned by PEM BioGroup LLC of Windsor. Initially the company produced FBS and basic cell culture manufacturing for research and also distributes for multiple companies worldwide. BI has developed cytogenetics media and stem cell culture media to include media for freezing and thawing human pluripotent stem cells.

== Publications ==
- An effective freezing/thawing method for human pluripotent stem cells cultured in chemically-defined and feeder-free conditions
- Human embryonic stem cell-derived cardiac progenitors for severe heart failure treatment: first clinical case report
