= Embroidery City =

Embroidery production base in Hunan, China

Embroidery City (湘绣城) is the biggest embroidery products production based in China. It is also included in the China National Intangible Cultural Heritage Protection and Research Base for the following functions: it researches and produces Hunan embroidery, clothes and home textiles, Chinese ceramics, and silver jewelry, and it retains the production process of China's traditional crafts.

== Sources ==
- Hunan Embroidery City Official Website www.echn.com.cn
- The phenomenon of cultural prosperity in Hunan: Hunan embroidery. China Economic Information Journal, 2007 24
- Hunan Embroidery Chrysanthemum Stone made the fifth-largest cultural industries. Star online. June 6, 2008
- Hunan Xiang Embroidery City: China Folk Cultural Property of the banner.三湘都市报
- Hunan, "Sange" naive million visitors are then "swept" Hunan Embroidery City
- Tian Fang. Feng Jicai at the end of On the Road, Folk Culture. Changsha Evening News, May 20, 2009
- Hunan Xiang Embroidery City, the financial crisis to straighten the backbone of national culture, the CPPCC Network, March 4, 2009
- XIONG Yuan-fan. Folk crafts competing for the "Mountain Flowers Award." Hunan Daily, 2009 On June 5
- Hunan Xiang Embroidery City into a national non-material cultural heritage protection research base, Changsha Evening News
