= List of universities and colleges in Hunan =

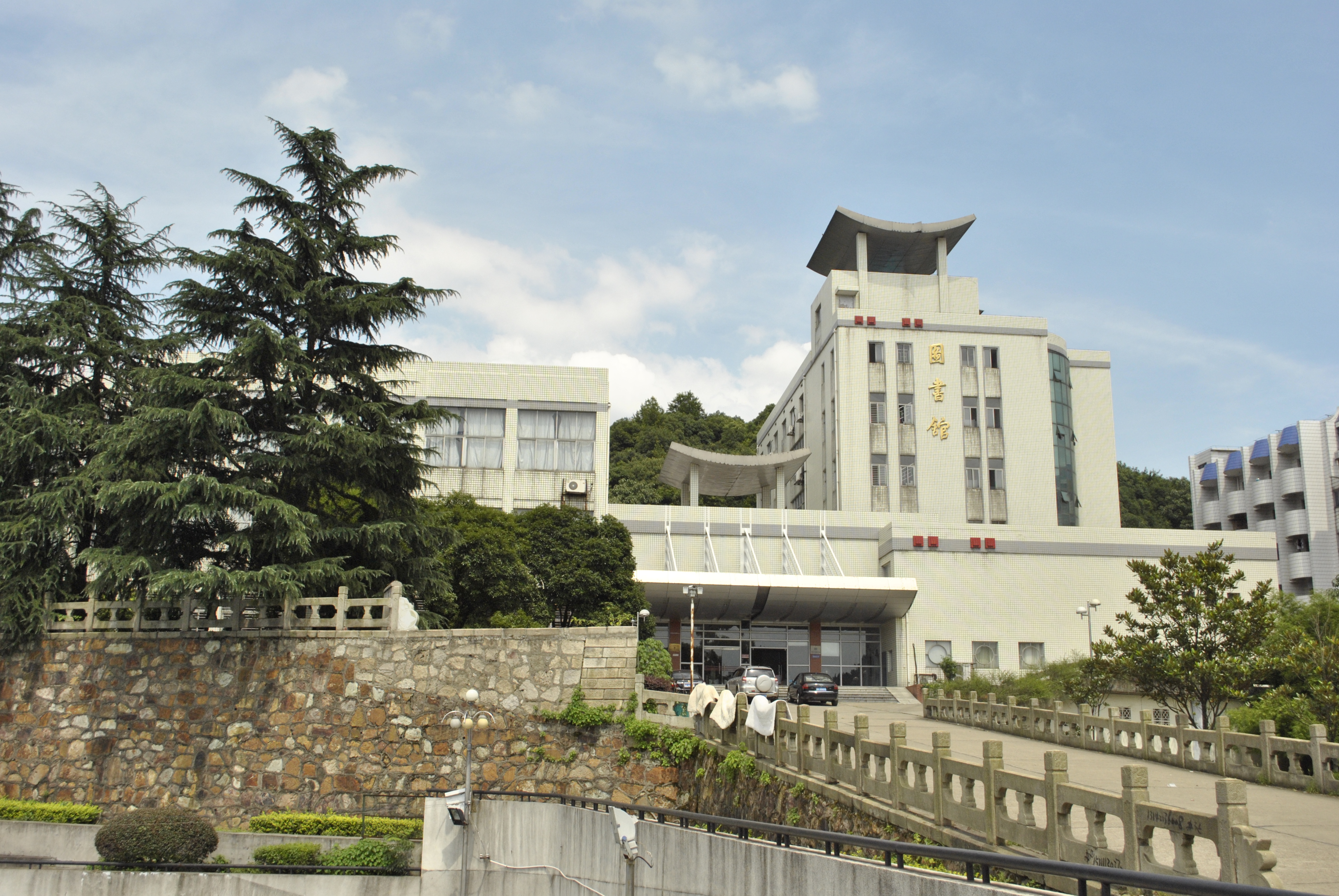
Hunan University

As of 2023, Hunan hosts 137 institutions of higher education, ranking fifth together with Sichuan (137) among all Chinese provinces after Jiangsu (168), Henan (168), Guangdong (162), and Shandong (156). Hunan is also the seat of 12 adult higher education institutions. Two major cities in Hunan (Changsha and Xiangtan) were ranked in the top 200 cities in the world by scientific research output, as tracked by the Nature Index in 2024.

There are three national key universities under Project 985 (Hunan University, Central South University and the National University of Defense Technology) in Hunan, the third highest after Beijing and Shanghai. Hunan Normal University in Changsha is the key construction university of the national 211 Project, and Xiangtan University in Xiangtan is a key university jointly built by Hunan Province and the Ministry of Education and a member of national Project 111. These five national key universities are included in the Double First-Class Universities of Hunan Province.

Hunan University and Central South University are the only two Project 985 universities in Changsha, Hunan to appear in the world's top 200 of the Academic Ranking of World Universities and the U.S. News & World Report Best Global University Ranking. Hunan Normal University, the National University of Defense and Technology and Changsha University of Science and Technology located in Changsha, were ranked in the world's top 701 of the Academic Ranking of World Universities.

Hunan Agricultural University in Changsha, the University of South China in Hengyang, Hunan University of Technology in Zhuzhou and Xiangtan University in Xiangtan were ranked in the top 801-900 globally by the Academic Ranking of World Universities. Hunan University of Science and Technology in Xiangtan and Central South University of Forestry and Technology in Changsha were ranked number 988 and number 1429 respectively in the 2022 Best Global Universities by the U.S. News & World Report Best Global University Ranking. As of 2023, Hunan University of Chinese Medicine in Changsha ranked the best in Central China region and 26th nationwide among Chinese Medical Universities.

== National key public universities ==
=== Changsha City ===
- Central South University (Project 211, Project 985, Double First Class University)
- Hunan University (Project 211, Project 985, Double First Class University)
- Hunan Normal University (Project 211, Double First Class University)
- National University of Defense Technology (Project 211, Project 985, Double First Class University)

=== Xiangtan City ===
- Xiangtan University ( Double First Class University)

== Provincial key public universities ==
=== Changsha City ===
- Central South University of Forestry and Technology
- Changsha University of Science and Technology
- Hunan Agricultural University
- Hunan First Normal University
- Hunan University of Chinese Medicine
- Hunan University of Technology and Commerce

=== Hengyang City ===
- Hengyang Normal University
- University of South China

=== Jishou City ===
- Jishou University

=== Loudi City ===
- Hunan University of Humanities, Science and Technology

=== Shaoyang City ===
- Shaoyang University

=== Xiangtan City ===
- Hunan Institute of Engineering
- Hunan University of Science and Technology

=== Yueyang City ===
- Hunan Institute of Science and Technology

=== Zhuzhou City ===
- Hunan University of Technology

== General undergraduate universities (public) ==
=== Changsha City ===
- Changsha Normal University
- Changsha University
- Hunan University of Finance and Economics
- Hunan Police Academy
- Hunan Women's University

=== Hengyang City ===
- Hunan Institute of Technology

=== Xiangtan City ===
- Xiangtan Institute of Technology

=== Yongzhou City ===
- Hunan University of Science and Engineering

== General undergraduate universities (private) ==
- Changsha Medical University
- Hunan International Economics University
- Hunan Institute of Information Technology
- Hunan Institute of Traffic Engineering
- Hunan Applied Technology University

== Vocational and technical colleges/universities ==
- Changsha Aeronautical Vocational and Technical College
- Changsha Social Work College
- Hunan Mass Media Vocational and Technical College
- Changde Vocational and Technical College

Name	Chinese name	Type	Location
Xiangtan University	湘潭大学	Provincial	Xiangtan
Jishou University	吉首大学	Provincial	Jishou
Hunan University	湖南大学	National (Direct)	Changsha
Central South University	中南大学	National (Direct)	Changsha
Hunan University of Science and Technology	湖南科技大学	Provincial	Xiangtan
Changsha University of Science and Technology	长沙理工大学	Provincial	Changsha
Hunan Agricultural University	湖南农业大学	Provincial	Changsha
Central South University of Forestry and Technology	中南林业科技大学	Provincial	Changsha
Hunan University of Traditional Chinese Medicine	湖南中医药大学	Provincial	Changsha
Hunan Normal University	湖南师范大学	Provincial	Changsha
Hunan Institute of Science and Technology	湖南理工学院	Provincial	Yueyang
Xiangnan University	湘南学院	Provincial	Chenzhou
Hengyang Normal University	衡阳师范学院	Provincial	Hengyang
Shaoyang University	邵阳学院	Provincial	Shaoyang
Huaihua University	怀化学院	Provincial	Huaihua
Hunan University of Arts and Science	湖南文理学院	Provincial	Changde
Hunan University of Science and Engineering	湖南科技学院	Provincial	Yongzhou
Hunan University of Humanities, Science and Technology	湖南人文科技学院	Provincial	Loudi
Hunan University of Commerce	湖南商学院	Provincial	Changsha
University of South China	南华大学	Provincial	Hengyang
Changsha Medical College	长沙医学院	Private	Changsha
Changsha University	长沙学院	Provincial	Changsha
Hunan Institute of Engineering	湖南工程学院	Provincial	Xiangtan
Hunan City University	湖南城市学院	Provincial	Yiyang
Hunan Institute of Technology	湖南工学院	Provincial	Hengyang
Hunan University of Finance and Economics	湖南财政经济学院	Provincial	Changsha
Hunan Police Academy	湖南警察学院	Provincial	Changsha
Hunan University of Technology	湖南工业大学	Provincial	Zhuzhou
Hunan Women's University	湖南女子学院	Provincial	Changsha
Hunan First Normal University	湖南第一师范学院	Provincial	Changsha
Hunan University of Medicine	湖南医药学院	Provincial	Huaihua
Hunan International Economics University	湖南涉外经济学院	Private	Changsha
Xingxiang College, Xiangtan University	湘潭大学兴湘学院	Private	Xiangtan
Shuda College, Hunan Normal University	湖南师范大学树达学院	Private	Changsha
Xiangxin College, Hunan University of Traditional Chinese Medicine	湖南中医药大学湘杏学院	Private	Changsha
Changsha Normal University	长沙师范学院	Provincial	Changsha
Hunan Applied Technology University	湖南应用技术学院	Private	Changde
Hunan Institute of Information Technology	湖南信息学院	Private	Changsha
Hunan Institute of Traffic Engineering	湖南交通工程学院	Private	Hengyang
