= Xu Teli =

- 徐特立
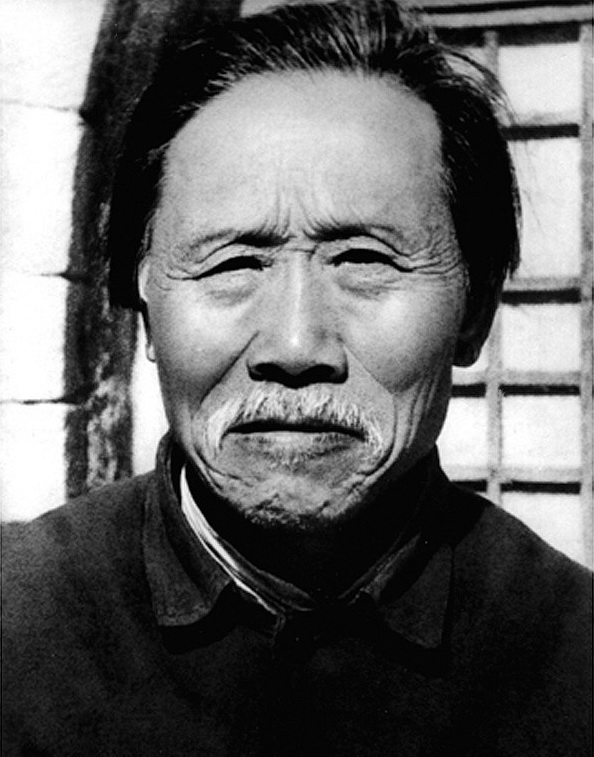
- Xu Teli, in Yan'an.

Vice-Minister of Publicity Department of the Chinese Communist Party
- In office 1949–1949
- Leader: Lu Dingyi (minister)

Minister of Education of Chinese Soviet Republic
- In office November 1931 – September 1937

Personal details
- Born: Xu Maoxun; February 1, 1877 Changsha County, Changsha, Hunan, Qing China
- Died: November 28, 1968 (aged 91) Beijing, China
- Party: Chinese Communist Party
- Spouse: Xiong Licheng
- Children: 4
- Education: University of Paris; Moscow Sun Yat-sen University

Xu Teli (Chinese: 徐特立; pinyin: Xú Tèlì; February 1, 1877 – November 28, 1968) was a politician of the People's Republic of China. Xu was the teacher of Mao Zedong, Cai Hesen, Xiao Zisheng, and Tian Han. Xu was a member of the 7th Central Committee of the Chinese Communist Party and the 8th Central Committee of the Chinese Communist Party.

== Biography ==
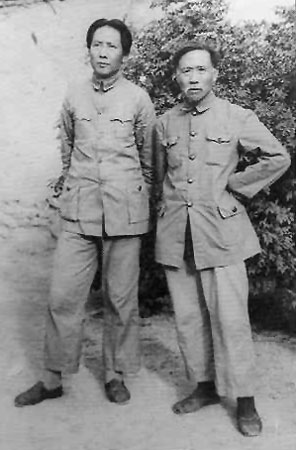
Xu Teli and Mao Zedong in Yan'an, in 1936.

Xu was born Xu Maoxun (Chinese: 徐懋恂) in Changsha County, Changsha, Hunan on February 1, 1877, during the Qing Dynasty. At the age of four, his mother died. In 1885, by age nine, Xu was sent to school.

At age eighteen, Xu set up a private school and taught there. In 1905, Xu attended the imperial examination when he was twenty-eight. After graduation, he became a teacher at Changsha Zhounan Girls' School. In 1907, Xu made a report on current affairs in the school, when he talked about the humiliating things of the corrupt government of Qing Empire, large tears began to fill his eyes and broke hot across his cheeks, Xu was indignation that he cut his little finger off with a kitchen knife, and wrote a protest with a pen dipped in the blood, fainted on the spot.

In 1911, Xu took part in the Xinhai Revolution and Hunan Uprising.

In 1912, Xu founded the Changsha County Normal School (currently Changsha Normal University).

In 1919, Xu studied natural sciences at the University of Paris, he also visited Belgium and Germany. In this trip Xu observed modern European societies and cultures for the first time. In June 1924, Xu returned to Changsha, he founded the Changsha Women's Normal School and served as the President there. At that time, Xu also taught at Hunan First Normal University.

In 1927, during the White Terror, Xu joined the Chinese Communist Party and took part in the Nanchang Uprising.

In 1928, Xu was sent to Moscow Sun Yat-sen University to study at the expense of the government.

In 1930, Xu returned to Jiangxi–Fujian Soviet, he was appointed as the Minister of Education of the Chinese Soviet Republic, a position he held until September 1937.

In 1934, Xu took part in the Long March.

In 1940, Xu worked as the President of Yan'an Academy of Natural Sciences. When he was in Yan'an, he and Dong Biwu, Lin Boqu, Wu Yuzhang, and Xie Juezai were called the Yan'an Five Seniors (Chinese: 延安五老).

After the founding of the Communist State, Xu was appointed as the Vice-Minister of Publicity Department of the Chinese Communist Party, a few days later, he resigned his post.

On November 28, 1968, during the Cultural Revolution, Xu died in Beijing, aged 91.

== Personal life ==
Xu married Xiong Licheng (Chinese: 熊立诚), they had four children, Xu Shouzhen (Chinese: 徐守珍), Xu Duben (Chinese: 徐笃本), Xu Moqing (Chinese: 徐陌青), and Xu Houben (Chinese: 徐厚本).

== Works ==
- Collected Works of Xu Teli
- Complete Works of Xu Teli

== See also ==
- Former Residence of Xu Teli
