= SYU =

SYU may refer to:

- Sahmyook University, South Korea
- Shaoyang University, China
- Shenyang University, China
- Hong Kong Shue Yan University
- Warraber Island Airport, Australia (by IATA code)
