= Wuhan Qingchuan University =

Private university in Wuhan, China

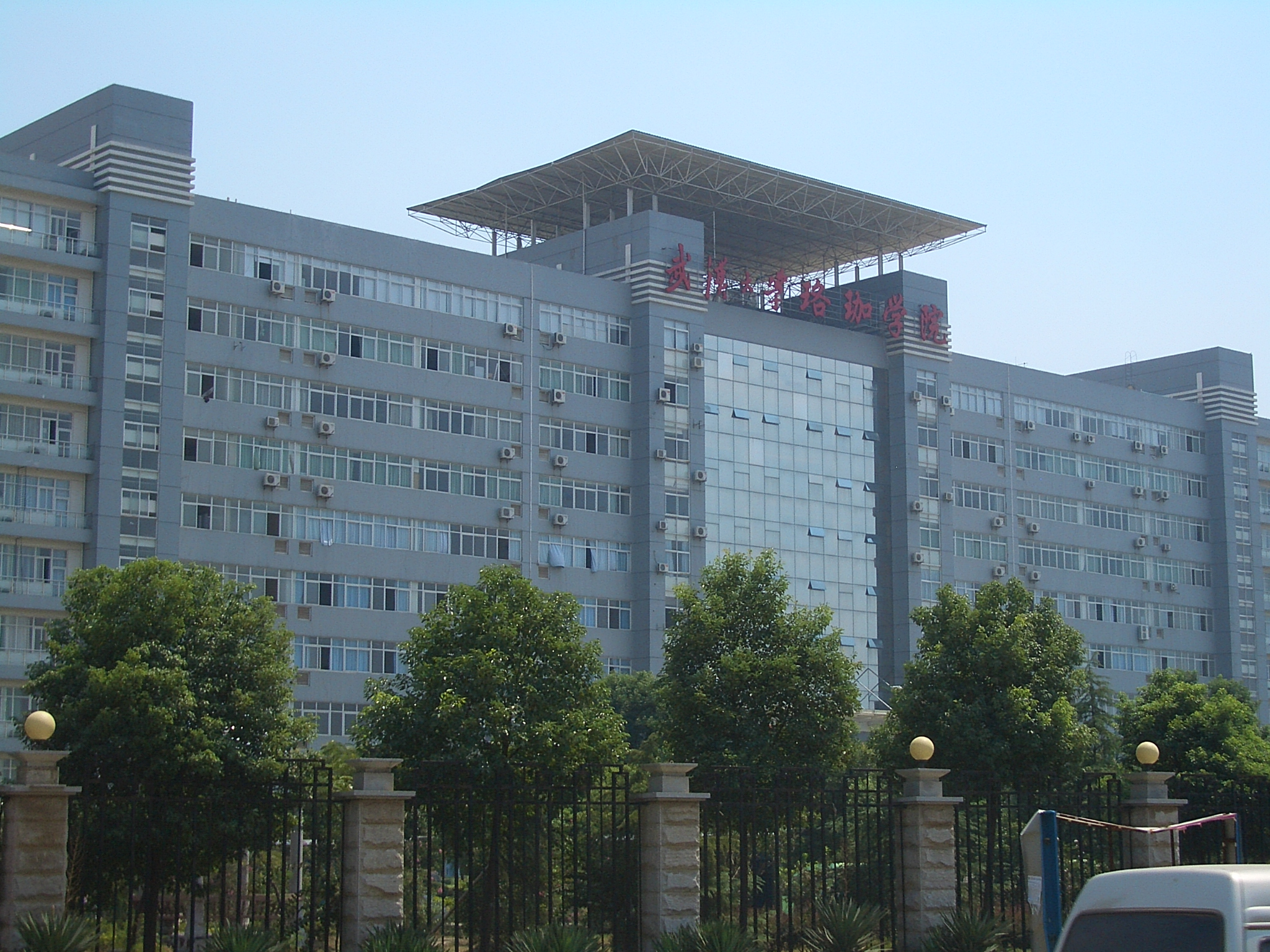

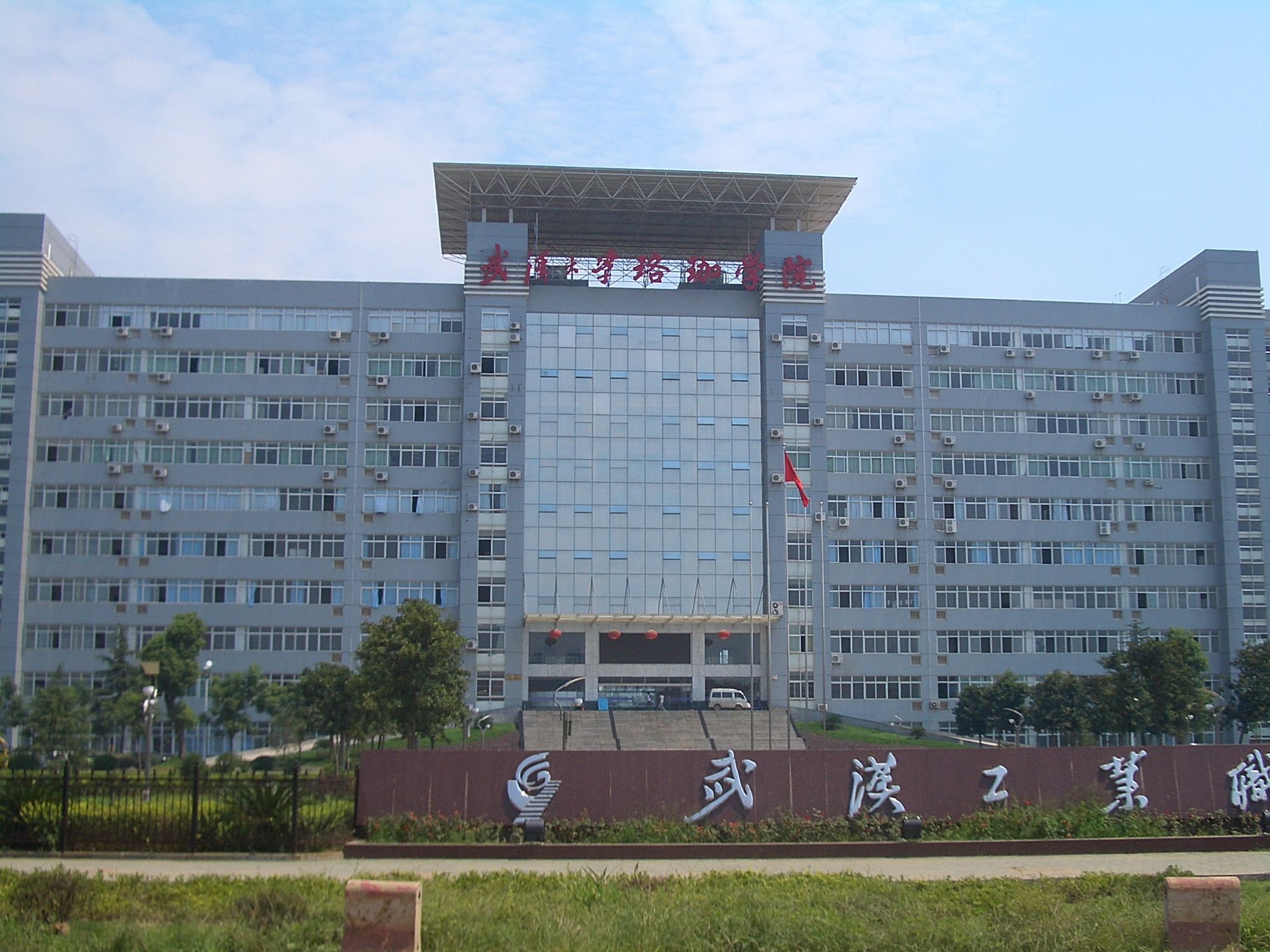

Wuhan Qingchuan University (武汉晴川学院; 'Wuhan Qingchuan College') is a private undergraduate college in Wuhan, Hubei, China. Despite the English name, the college has not yet be granted university status by the Ministry of Education of China.

== Faculty Structure ==
There are about 14,000 students, 588 full-time teachers and 109 external teachers; professors and associate professors account for about 40%, and teachers with master's degrees or above account for nearly 90%, including nearly 40 doctoral supervisors and experts with special allowances from the State Council.
