= Changsha Normal University =

Provincial public college in Changsha, Hunan, China

Coordinates: 28°14′29″N 113°04′43″E

- 长沙师范学院
- Motto: 自立自强，致高致远
- Type: Public college
- Established: 1912; 114 years ago
- President: Cao Xiaoxian (曹晓鲜)
- Academic staff: 796 (June 2019)
- Students: 16,000 (June 2019)
- Location: Changsha, Hunan, China
- Campus: 1,100 mu
- Website: www.cssf.cn/index.html

Changsha Normal University (Chinese: 长沙师范学院; lit. 'Changsha Teachers College') is a provincial public teachers college in Changsha, Hunan, China. Despite its English name, the school has not been granted university status. The college is under the Hunan Provincial Department of Education.

As of fall 2013, the university has two campuses, a combined student body of 10,000 students, 600 faculty members. The university consists of 10 departments, with 6 specialties for undergraduates. The university covers a total area of 1,100 mu, with more than 10,178 square meters of floor space.

== History ==
Changsha Normal University was founded in 1912 by Xu Teli, it was initially called "Changsha County Normal School".

In April 2013, the institute was granted the college status and was approved by the Ministry of Education to use "Changsha Teachers College" as its Chinese name. However, since the Ministry does not regulate academic institutions' English names, the institute used "Changsha Normal University" as its English name since then despite the fact that it was not granted the university status.

== Academics ==
- Department of Preprimary Education
- Department of Elementary Education
- Department of Music
- Department of Foreign Languages
- Department of Animation
- Department of Electronic and Information Engineering
- Department of Digital Publishing
- Department of Art and Design
- Department of Economic Management
- Department of Physical Education

== Rankings ==
As of 2023, the Best Chinese Universities Ranking, also known as the "Shanghai Ranking", placed Changsha Normal University 530th in China. The university ranked # 10,810 in the world out of more than 30,000 universities worldwide by the Webometrics Ranking Web of Universities 2023.

== Affiliated schools ==
- No.1 Attached Kindergarten
- No.2 Attached Kindergarten

== People ==
=== Notable alumni ===
- Tian Han
- Xu Guangda
- Liao Mosha
- Liu Ying
- Xie Bingying
- Luo Xuezan

=== Notable faculty ===
- Xu Teli
- Yang Changji
- Zhu Jianfan
- Zhou Gucheng
- Liu Zhixun
