= Chen Xiaohong =

Chen Xiaohong may refer to:

- Xiaohong Chen, Chinese economist
- Chen Xiaohong (engineer), Chinese management science and engineering management specialist
- Chen Xiaohong (politician) (Chinese: 陈啸宏), deputy Director of the National Health and Family Planning Commission.
