= Hengyang Normal University =

Provincial public college in Hengyang, Hunan, China

- 衡阳师范学院
- Motto: 厚德、博学、砺志、笃行
- Type: Public college
- President: Pi Xiuping (皮修平)
- Academic staff: 1,283 (October 2019)
- Students: 22,000 (October 2019)
- Location: Hengyang, Hunan, China; 26°52′50″N 112°40′42″E
- Campus: 1.444 square kilometres (357 acres)
- Website: www.hynu.edu.cn

Hengyang Normal University (Chinese: 衡阳师范学院; pinyin: Héngyáng Shīfàn Xuéyuàn) is a provincial public college in Hengyang, Hunan, China. Despite its English name, the school has not been granted university status. The college is over the Hunan Provincial Department of Education.

== History ==
Hengyang Normal University was formed in 1904; it was initially called "Hunan Provincial Normal School". As of fall 2013, the university has two campuses, a combined student body of 16,000 students and 800 faculty members. The university consists of 2 colleges and 17 departments, with 39 specialties for undergraduates.

== Academics ==
- School of Nanyue
- School of Continuing Education
- Department of Humanities and social sciences
- Department of Political science
- Department of Economic Management
- Department of Law
- Department of Chinese language and Literature
- Department of Journalism and Communication
- Department of Chemistry and Materials science
- Department of Tourism management
- Department of Computer Science
- Department of Music
- Department of Art
- Department of Physical Education
- Department of Foreign languages
- Department of Mathematics and Computing sciences
- Department of Physical and Electronic information sciences
- Department of Life Science
- Department of Education Science

== Rankings ==
As of 2023, the Best Chinese Universities Ranking, also known as the "Shanghai Ranking", placed the university 15th in Hunan and 360th in nationwide. The university ranked # 2486 in the world out of nearly 30,000 universities worldwide by the University Rankings by Academic Performance 2021-2022.

== Culture ==
- Motto: 厚德、博学、砺志、笃行

== People ==
=== Notable alumni ===
- Zhong Daiying
- Zhang Qiuren
- Jiang Xianyun
- Huang Jingyuan
- Huang Kecheng
- Jiang Hua
- Tao Zhu
- Zhang Jingwu
- Zhang Pinghua
- Zhang Jichun
- Zeng Xisheng
- Tang Tianji
- Zhou Li
- Qin Guangrong
- Fan Fenfang
- Wu Yunfu
