= Changsha Medical University =

Private university in Changsha, China

Coordinates: 28°17′53″N 112°52′34″E

Changsha Medical College (CSMU, Chinese: 长沙医学院) is the first private medical undergraduate college in China, located in Changsha, Hunan Province, China. The school has not been granted university status.

Changsha Medical University/College, China's governmental medical university for undergraduates, was founded by the famous educator Binsheng He in 1989. It is situated in Changsha, the capital of Hunan Province and was upgraded to a medical university for undergraduates in 2005 by the Ministry of Education. CSMU is under the jurisdiction of Hunan People's Government and the professional guidance of the Department of Public Health of the government.

== Ranking ==
Changsha Medical University is listed in WHO's World Directory of Medical Schools and is welcoming students from all over the world. As of 2023, Changsha Medical University ranked the best private university in Hunan and 16th nationwide in the recent edition of the recognized Best Chinese Universities Ranking.

The university ranked # 9,926 in the world out of more than 30,000 universities worldwide by the Webometrics Ranking Web of Universities 2023.
