= Hankou University =

Private college in Wuhan, Hubei, China

- 汉口学院
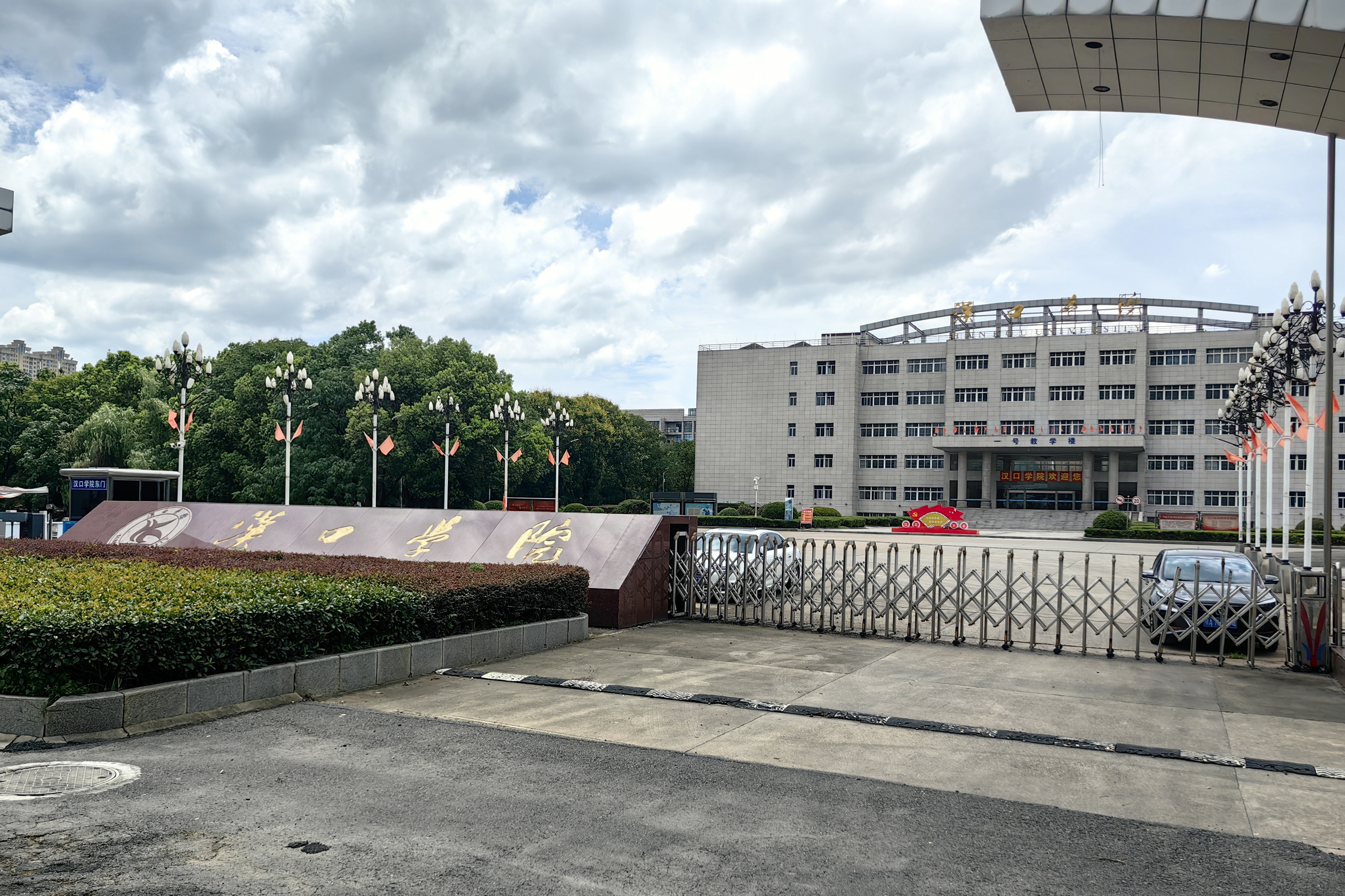
- Motto: 敢为人先，实事求是，志存高远，追求卓越
- Type: Public
- Established: 2000
- Location: Wuhan, Hubei, China
- Website: http://www.hkxy.edu.cn/

Hankou University (汉口学院) is a private undergraduate college in Wuhan, Hubei, China.
