= Changsha University =

Provincial public college in Changsha, Hunan, China

- 长沙学院
- Motto: 力学笃行
- Motto in English: Seek for Noble Mind, Profound Knowledge, Strong Physique and Consummate Skills.
- Type: Public college
- Established: 1970; 56 years ago
- President: Yang Xiaoyun (杨小云)
- Academic staff: 1,118 (October 2019)
- Students: 14,333 (October 2019)
- Location: Changsha, Hunan, China
- Campus: Urban
- Website: www.ccsu.edu.cn

Changsha University (Chinese: 长沙学院; pinyin: Chángshā Dàxué) is a provincial public college in Changsha, Hunan, China. Despite its English name, the school has not been granted university status. The college is under the Hunan Provincial Department of Education.

== See also ==
- Changsha University of Science and Technology
