= Hunan University of Chinese Medicine =

Public university in Changsha, China

Coordinates: 28°08′03″N 112°53′40″E

- 湖南中医药大学
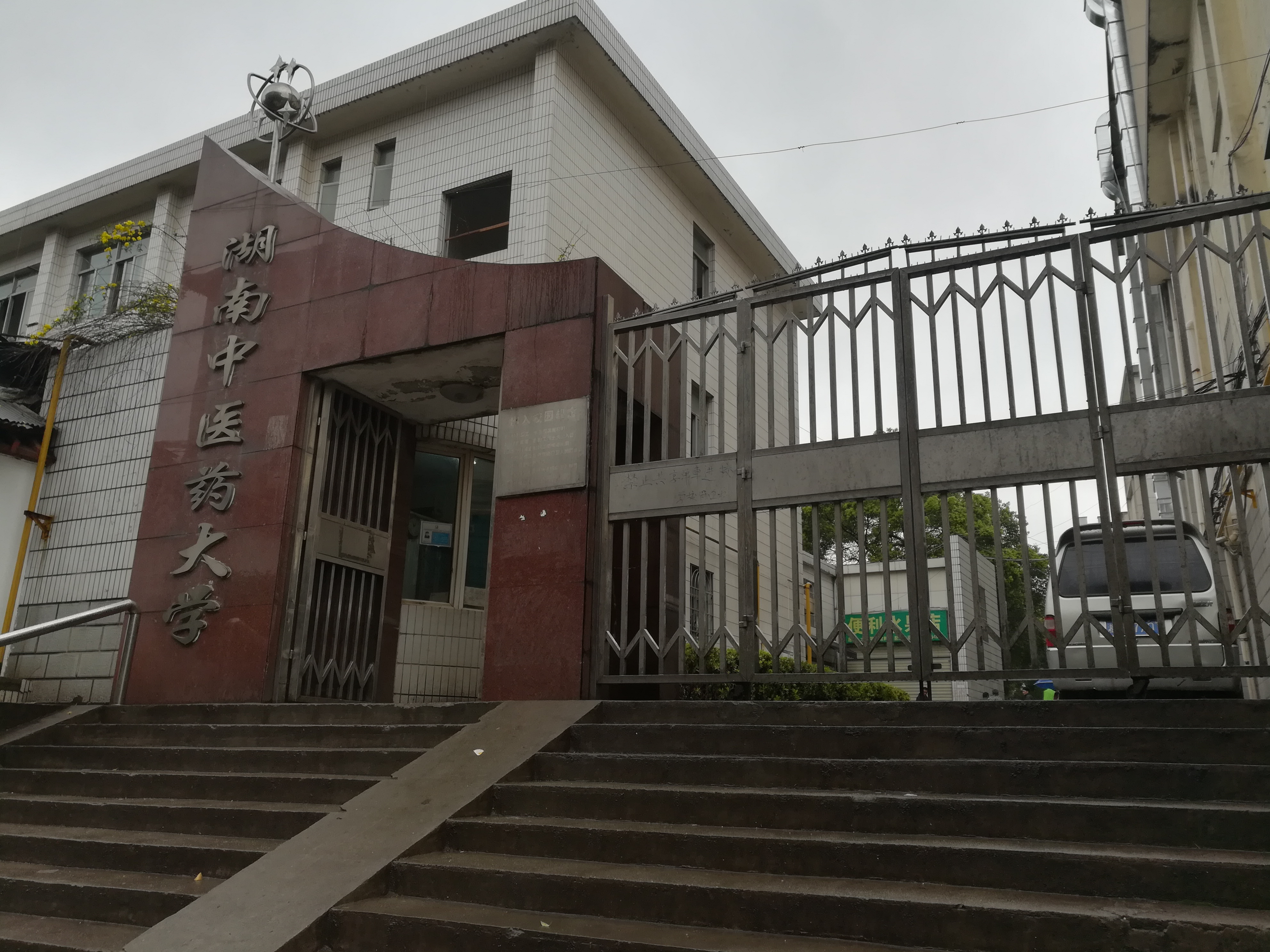
- Entrance of Hunan University of Chinese Medicine.
- Former names: Hunan College of Traditional Chinese Medicine; Hunan Chinese Medicine Specialty School; Hunan TCM Vocational School
- Type: Public university
- Established: 1960; 66 years ago
- President: Dai Aiguo (戴爱国)
- Faculty: 1,488 (September 2019)
- Undergraduates: 15,100 (September 2019)
- Postgraduates: 2,746 (September 2019)
- Location: Changsha, Hunan, China
- Campus: Changsha Campus
- Nickname: TCM
- Website: Hunan University of Chinese Medicine Official Site

Hunan University of Chinese Medicine (simplified Chinese: 湖南中医药大学; traditional Chinese: 湖南中醫藥大學; pinyin: Húnán Zhōngyīyào Dàxué) is a public university located in Changsha, Hunan province, China. The university offers courses in Traditional Chinese Medicine.

As of 2023, Hunan University of Chinese Medicine is ranked the best in Central China and 26th nationwide among Chinese Medical Universities including in the ranking.

== History ==
The university traces its history from Hunan Chinese Medicine Specialty School established in 1934 and Hunan TCM Vocational School established in 1953. From 1960 up to a few years after 2000, it was known as Hunan College of Traditional Chinese Medicine. The current Hunan University of Traditional Chinese Medicine was officially created and approved by the State Ministry of Education in 2006 when this TCM College had successfully merged with the former Hunan University of Science and Technology and the Hunan Academy of Traditional Chinese Medicine (research-focused). The University, as it stands now, is primarily a teaching-oriented medical school, but also involved heavily in TCM research, providing health-care services to the province, and is one of the leading TCM universities in China.

On December 28, 2018, President Tan Yuansheng (Chinese: 谭元生) has been stripped of his post and party membership for alleged "serious violations of discipline and laws."

== Location and Campus ==
The university is based in Changsha, the capital of Hunan province. The campus covers an area of 4701 acres or approximately 1,902,6000 square meters.

The university consists of 3 campuses : the old campus (north campus), the new campus (Hanpu campus), and seven affiliated clinical hospitals.

The university consists of 5 nursing schools.

== Administration ==
=== Colleges and Departments ===
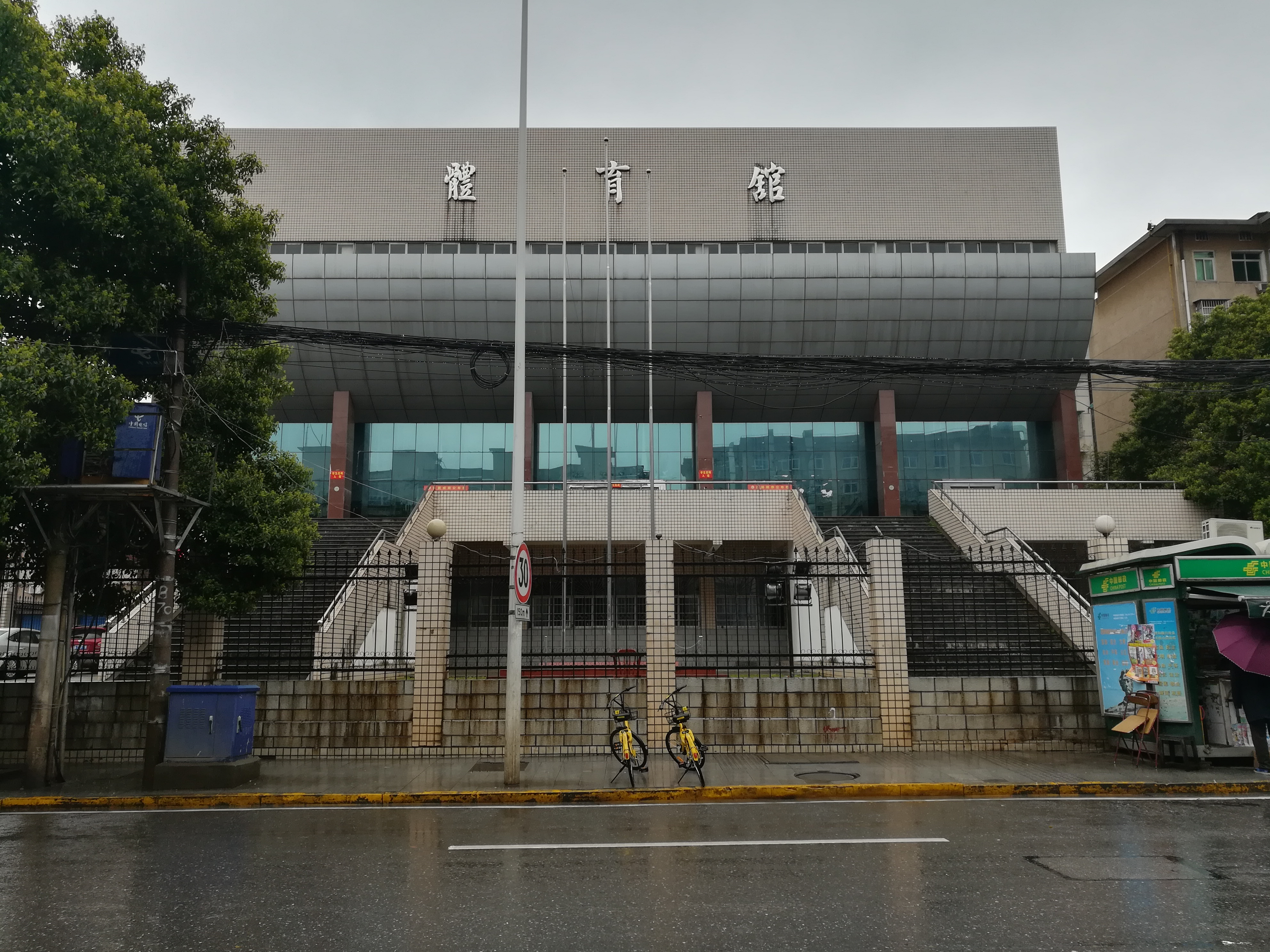
Frontal view of the Gymnasium of Hunan University of Chinese Medicine.

The university administers the following 20 colleges or institutes:

- The College of Western medicine(MBBS)
- The College of Neurology
- The College of Cardiology
- The College of Orthopedics
- The College of Gynaecology and Obstetrics
- The College of Pediatrics
- The College of Basic Science
- The College of Acupuncture and Massage
- The College of combined Chinese and Western Medicine
- The College of Pharmacy
- The First College of Clinical Medicine
- The Second College of Clinical medicine
- The College of Culture, Information Technology and Management
- International Education Institute
- Second-level College, Xianxing College
- The College of Adult Education
- Higher Vocational Technical College
- Graduate students Department
- Social Science Department
- The Third College of Medicine

== Rankings and reputation ==
In 2018, the Best Chinese Universities Ranking, also known as the "Shanghai Ranking", ranked Hunan University of Chinese Medicine at 282nd among all Chinese universities, and as of 2023, Hunan University of Chinese Medicine is ranked the best in Central China and 26th nationwide among Chinese Medical Universities including in the ranking.

As of 2022, Hunan University of Chinese Medicine ranked #1854 globally, #734 in Asia and #283 in China in the 2023 Best Global Universities by the U.S. News & World Report Best Global University Ranking. The university ranked # 1858 in the world out of nearly 30,000 universities worldwide by the University Rankings by Academic Performance 2022-2023.

== See also ==
- First Affiliated Hospital of Hunan University of Chinese Medicine
