= Chen Xiaohong (engineer) =

Chinese management science and engineering management specialist

- 陈晓红

Communist Party Secretary of Hunan University of Technology and Commerce
- Incumbent
- Assumed office April 2021
- President: Huang Xin
- Preceded by: Wang Hanqing

President of Hunan University of Technology and Commerce
- In office September 2014 – April 2021
- Leader: Wang Hanqing (party secretary)
- Preceded by: Tang Mobing
- Succeeded by: Huang Xin

Personal details
- Born: 15 May 1963 (age 63) Changsha, Hunan, China
- Party: Chinese Communist Party
- Education: Central South University; Tokyo Institute of Technology
- Scientific career
- Fields: Management science Engineering management
- Workplaces: Hunan University of Technology and Business

Chinese name
- Simplified Chinese: 陈晓红
- Traditional Chinese: 陳曉紅
Transcriptions
Standard Mandarin
- Hanyu Pinyin: Chén Xiǎohóng

Chen Xiaohong (born 15 May 1963) is a Chinese management science and engineering management specialist, an academician of the Chinese Academy of Engineering, and currently Chinese Communist Party Committee Secretary of Hunan University of Technology and Commerce.

== Biography ==
Chen was born in Changsha, Hunan, on 15 May 1963, while her ancestral home in Yongxin County, Jiangxi. She received his bachelor's degree and master's degree from Central South University of Technology (now Central South University) in 1983 and 1986, respectively. She received her doctor's degree from Tokyo Institute of Technology in 1999.

She joined the Chinese Communist Party in May 1983. Chen taught at Central South University of Technology since 1986, what she was promoted to associate professor in December 1991 and to full professor in September 1994. She also served as dean of Business Administration School from June 1999 to April 2002, and dean of Business School from April 2002 to January 2009. Chen became president of Hunan University of Technology and Commerce, in September 2014, and then Chinese Communist Party Committee Secretary, the top political position in the university, beginning in April 2021. In March 2018, she became a member of the 13th National Committee of the Chinese People's Political Consultative Conference.

== Honors and awards ==
- 2005 State Science and Technology Progress Award (Second Class)
- 27 November 2017 Member of the Chinese Academy of Engineering (CAE)

Educational offices
Preceded by Tang Mobing (唐未兵)	President of Hunan University of Technology and Commerce; 2014–2021	Succeeded by Huang Xin (黄昕)
Party political offices
Preceded by Wang Hanqing (王汉青)	Communist Party Secretary of Hunan University of Technology and Commerce; 2021–present	Incumbent
