= Hunan Police Academy =

Public college in Changsha, Hunan, China

Coordinates: 28°13′24″N 113°07′48″E

- 湖南警察学院
- Motto: 忠、真、智、勇
- Type: Public college
- Established: 1949; 77 years ago
- President: Lin Shaoju (林少菊)
- Academic staff: 337
- Students: 5,000
- Location: Changsha, Hunan, China
- Campus: 700 mu
- Website: www.hnpolice.com

Hunan Police Academy (Chinese: 湖南警察学院; pinyin: Húnán Jǐngchá Xuéyuàn) is a public college and police academy located in Changsha, Hunan, China.

As of fall 2013, the university has one campus, a combined student body of 5,000 students, 337 faculty members.

The university consists of 1 college and 7 departments, with 13 specialties for undergraduates. The university covers a total area of 700 mu, with more than 210,000 square meters of floor space.

As of 2021, Hunan Police Academy ranked first in Hunan and 17th nationwide among universities specialized in Political Science and Law in the recognized Best Chinese Universities Ranking.

== History ==
Hunan Police Academy was founded in September 1949. It was initially called "Hunan Provincial Public Security School".

On January 22, 2010, it was renamed "Hunan Police Academy".

== Academics ==
- School of Police
- Department of Investigation
- Department of Criminal Technology
- Department of Computer Engineering
- Department of Public Security
- Department of Law
- Department of Traffic Management
- Department of Public Administration

== Rankings ==
As of 2021, Hunan Police Academy ranked first in Hunan and 17th nationwide among universities specialized in Political Science and Law in the recognized Best Chinese Universities Ranking. The university ranked # 10,527 in the world out of more than 30,000 universities worldwide by the Webometrics Ranking Web of Universities 2023.

== Library collections ==
Hunan Police Academy's total collection amounts to more than 690,000 items.

== Culture ==
- Motto: 忠、真、智、勇
