= First Affiliated Hospital of Hunan University of Chinese Medicine =

Hospital in Changsha, China

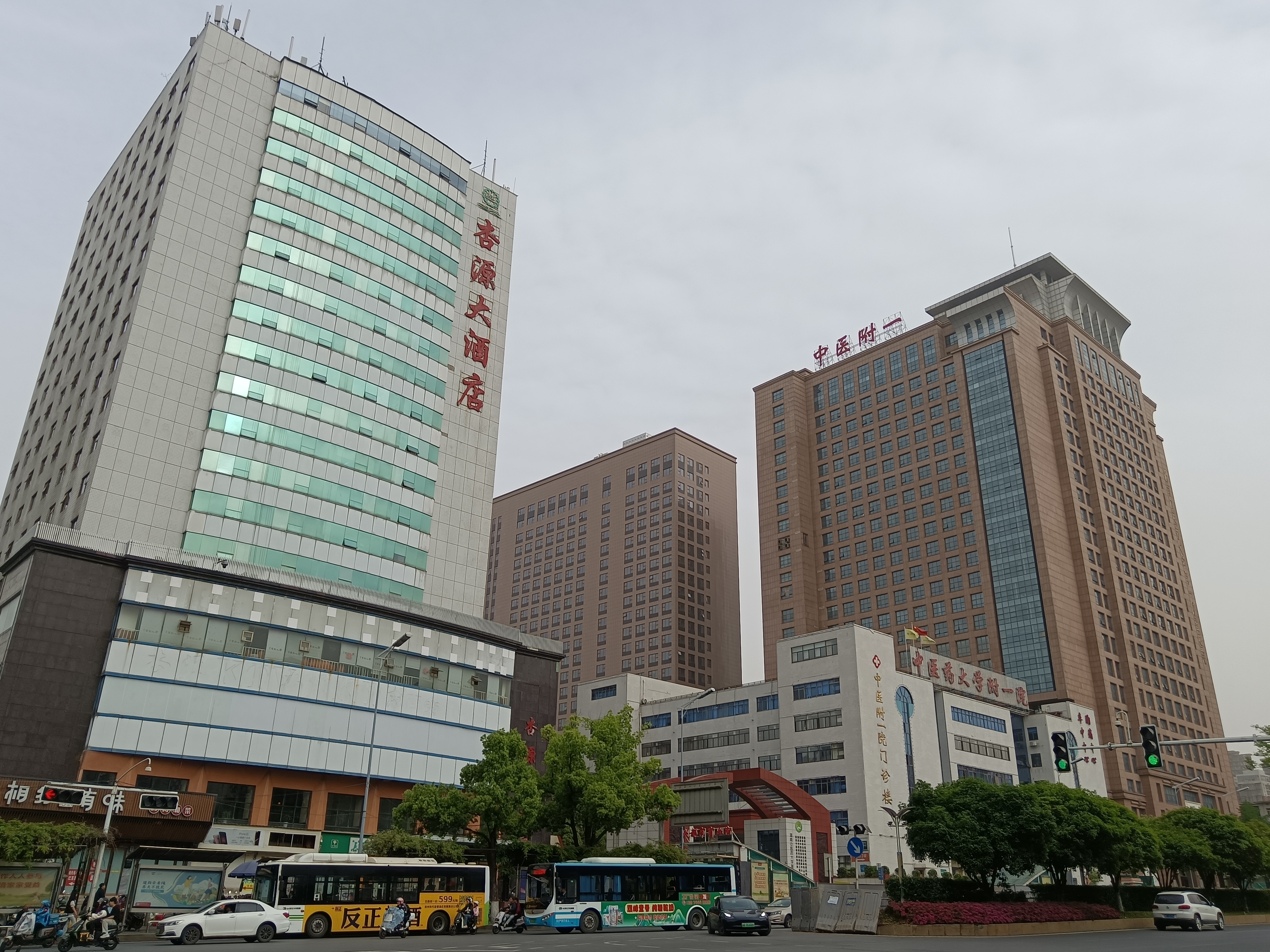

The First Affiliated Hospital of Hunan University of Chinese Medicine (simplified Chinese: 湖南中医药大学第一附属医院; traditional Chinese: 湖南中醫藥大學第一附屬醫院) is a Grade-A tertiary hospital of Traditional Chinese Medicine (TCM) located in Changsha, capital of Hunan Province in China. Founded in 1963, it is now a top TCM hospital in China, responsible for medical treatment, education and research.

== History ==
In 1963, the "First Affiliated Hospital of Hunan College of Traditional Chinese Medicine" was established in Changsha. There was only one outpatient and inpatient building with 50 beds.

In 2005, it was renamed the "First Affiliated Hospital of Hunan University of Chinese Medicine".

In 2008, the hospital became a national TCM clinical research base.

On January 19, 2010, it was designated by the National Administration of Traditional Chinese Medicine as a "National Demonstration Unit for Informatization in TCM Hospitals".

In 2017, the hospital was selected as a construction unit of the national "TCM inheritance and innovation project".

In 2023, it was approved as a National Demonstration Center for Clinical Teaching and Training in Traditional Chinese Medicine.

In 2025, the hodpital was honored with the title of "Advanced Collective in the National Health System", becoming the only Traditional Chinese Medicine hospital in Hunan Province to receive this honor. The award was announced by the Ministry of Human Resources and Social Security, the National Health Commission, the National Administration of Traditional Chinese Medicine, and the National Disease Control and Prevention Administration.

== Current status ==
The First Affiliated Hospital of Hunan University of Chinese Medicine covers a land area of 7.33 hectares, with a total construction area of 240,000 square meters.

There is an annual number of more than 1.6 million outpatient visits, 1,878 beds, and nearly 70,000 inpatient discharges.

There are 5 national priority disciplines, 37 clinical departments and 12 medical laboratories.

Each year, the hospital undertakes the teaching of 126 clinical courses, with over 20,000 hours of theoretical instruction and more than 13,000 hours of laboratory instruction.

The hospital published 4 papers listed in Nature Index for the Time frame of 1 March 2025 - 28 February 2026, ranking 1528th globally and 506th in China.

Hospital address: No. 95, Shaoshan Road (Middle), Changsha, Hunan, China.

== Events ==
In April 2026, the son of the dean of the First Hospital of Hunan University of Chinese Medicine was reported to have received duplicate performance bonuses from two different departments of the hodpital, totaling $11,600. The University then ordered him to return the money and asked the hospital to prevent similar cases from happening again.

== See also ==
- Hunan University of Chinese Medicine
