= Changsha Social Work College =

Technical college in Changsha, China

Coordinates: 28.1375°N 113.0168°E

Changsha Social Work Technical College
- 长沙民政职业技术学院
- Type: Public university
- Established: 1984; 42 years ago
- Location: Changsha, Hunan, China
- Website: www.csmzxy.com

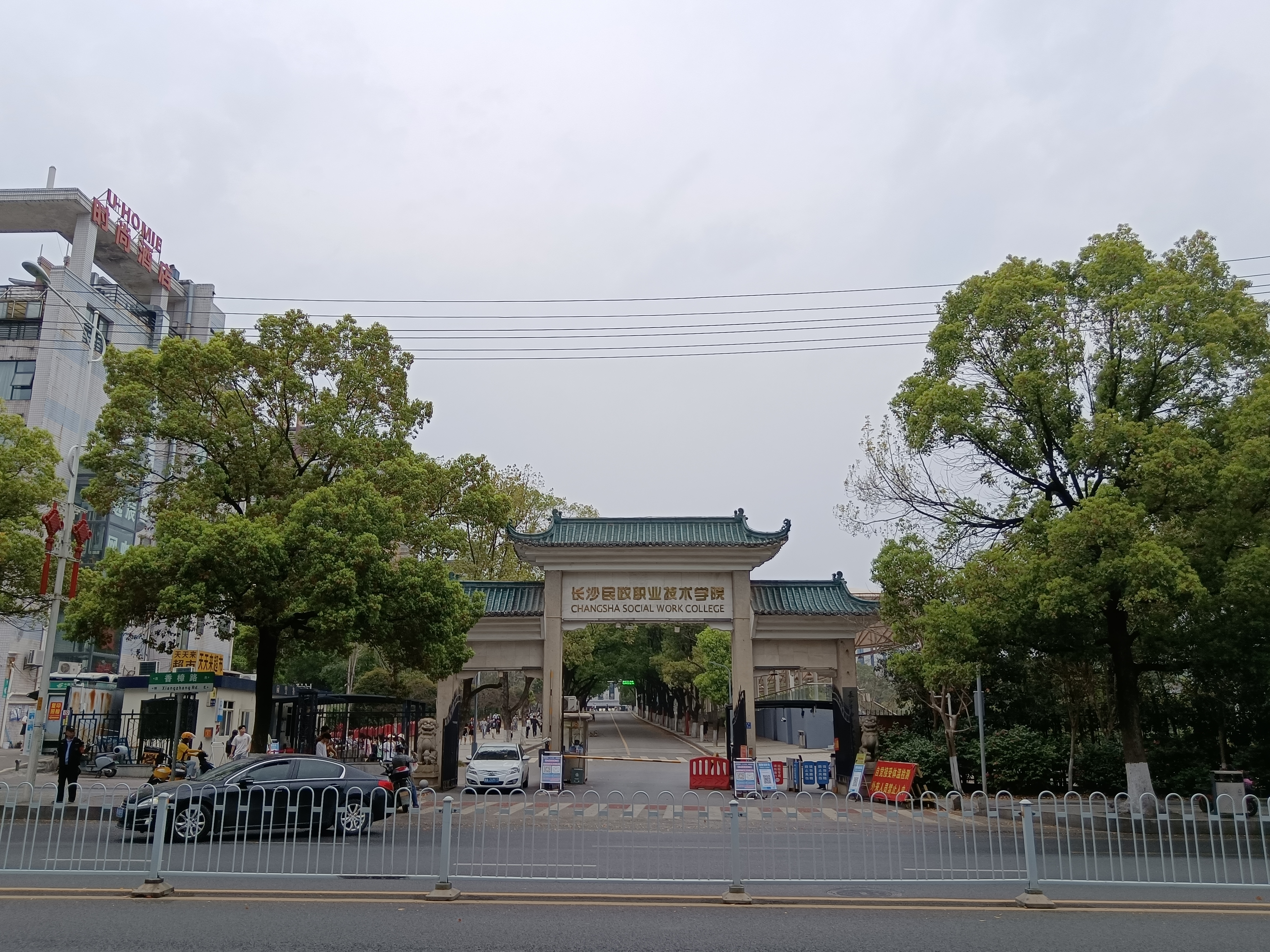
Entrance of Changsha Social Work College in Changsha, Hunan, China

Changsha Social Work Technical College (Chinese: 长沙民政职业技术学院) is a technical college located in Changsha, Hunan, China. It was established in 1984.

The college became one of the first one to launch a senior care program in China in 1999.

== Rankings ==
As of 2024, Changsha Social Work Technical College ranked the best in Hunan and 3rd nationwide among vocational schools in the recent edition of the recognized Best Chinese Universities Ranking. The college ranked # 10,010 in the world out of more than 30,000 universities and colleges worldwide by the Webometrics Ranking Web of Universities 2023.
