= Hunan First Normal University =

Public university in Changsha, Hunan, China

Coordinates: 28.2°N 112.862°E

- 湖南第一师范学院
- Motto: 要做人民的先生，先做人民的学生
- Motto in English: If you want to be the teacher of the people, you must be the student of the people at first
- Type: Public University
- Established: 1903; 123 years ago
- President: Peng Xiaoqi (彭小奇)
- Academic staff: 1,155 (2019)
- Students: 19,556 (2019)
- Location: Changsha, Hunan, China
- Website: www.hnfnu.edu.cn

Chinese name
- Simplified Chinese: 湖南第一师范学院
- Traditional Chinese: 湖南第一師範學院
Transcriptions
Standard Mandarin
- Hanyu Pinyin: Húnán Dìyī Shīfàn Xuéyuàn

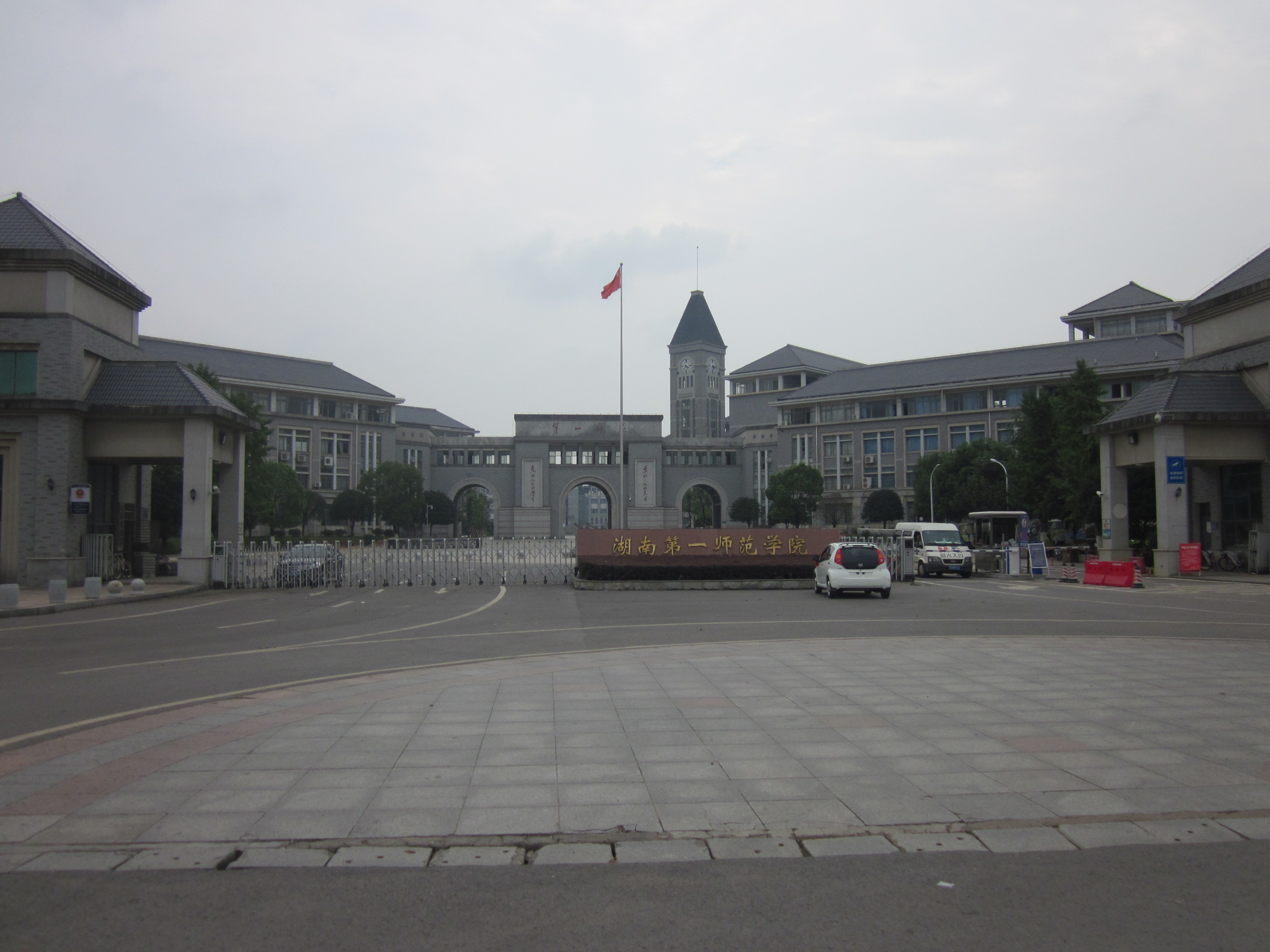
Hunan First Normal University

Hunan First Normal University (Chinese: 湖南第一师范学院), founded in 1903, is a university located in Yuelu District, Changsha, Hunan Province, China.

Hunan First Normal University covers a total area of 1346 mu, with more than 420,000 square meters of floor space. The university is divided into 10 colleges.

As of 2023, the Best Chinese Universities Ranking, also known as the "Shanghai Ranking", placed Hunan First Normal University at 14th in Hunan province and 344th in China.

== Leaders ==
The president (校長) is the highest academic official of Hunan First Normal University. The president is the chief executive, appointed by the Ministry of Education of the People's Republic of China (MOE).

After the founding of People's Republic of China, the responsibilities were separated into two posts, the president and Communist Party secretary.

The president position is currently held by Xiao Xiangyu, who formerly served as the president of Jishou University from August 2011 until December 2013.

== Rankings ==
As of 2023, the Best Chinese Universities Ranking, also known as the "Shanghai Ranking", placed Hunan First Normal University at 14th in Hunan province and 344th in China. Hunan First Normal University ranked 4278 in the world out of nearly 30,000 universities worldwide by the Webometrics Ranking Web of Universities 2023.

== Noted alumni ==
- Mao Zedong
- Cai Hesen
- He Shuheng
- Xia Xi
