= Hunan University of Technology =

Public university in Zhuzhou, Hunan, China

- 湖南工业大学
- Motto: 厚德博学、和而不同
- Type: Public university
- Established: 1979; 47 years ago
- President: Jiang Changbo (蒋昌波)
- Academic staff: 2,370 (January 2020)
- Students: 30,664 (January 2020)
- Undergraduates: 28,345 (January 2020)
- Postgraduates: 1,805 (January 2020)
- Doctoral students: 31 (January 2020)
- Location: Zhuzhou, Hunan, China
- Website: www.hut.edu.cn

Hunan University of Technology (simplified Chinese: 湖南工业大学; traditional Chinese: 湖南工業大學; pinyin: Húnán Gōngyè Dàxué) is a university located in Zhuzhou, Hunan, China. As of April 2014, the university has five campuses, 37,907 students including 1,276 graduate students, and 1,793 faculty members. The university consists of 19 schools, with 60 undergraduate programs and 11 master's degree programs.

== History ==
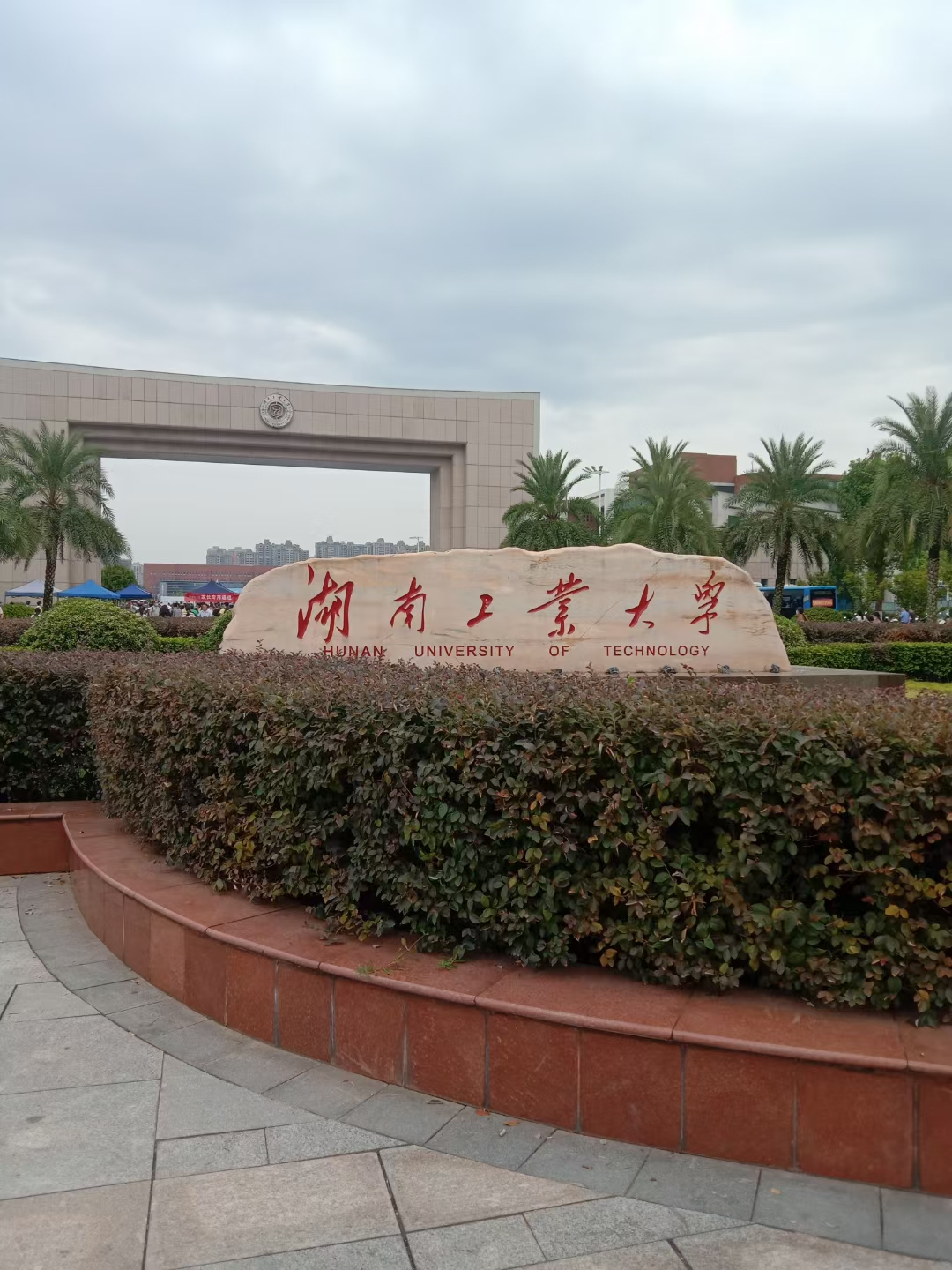
Stele of Hunan University of Technology.

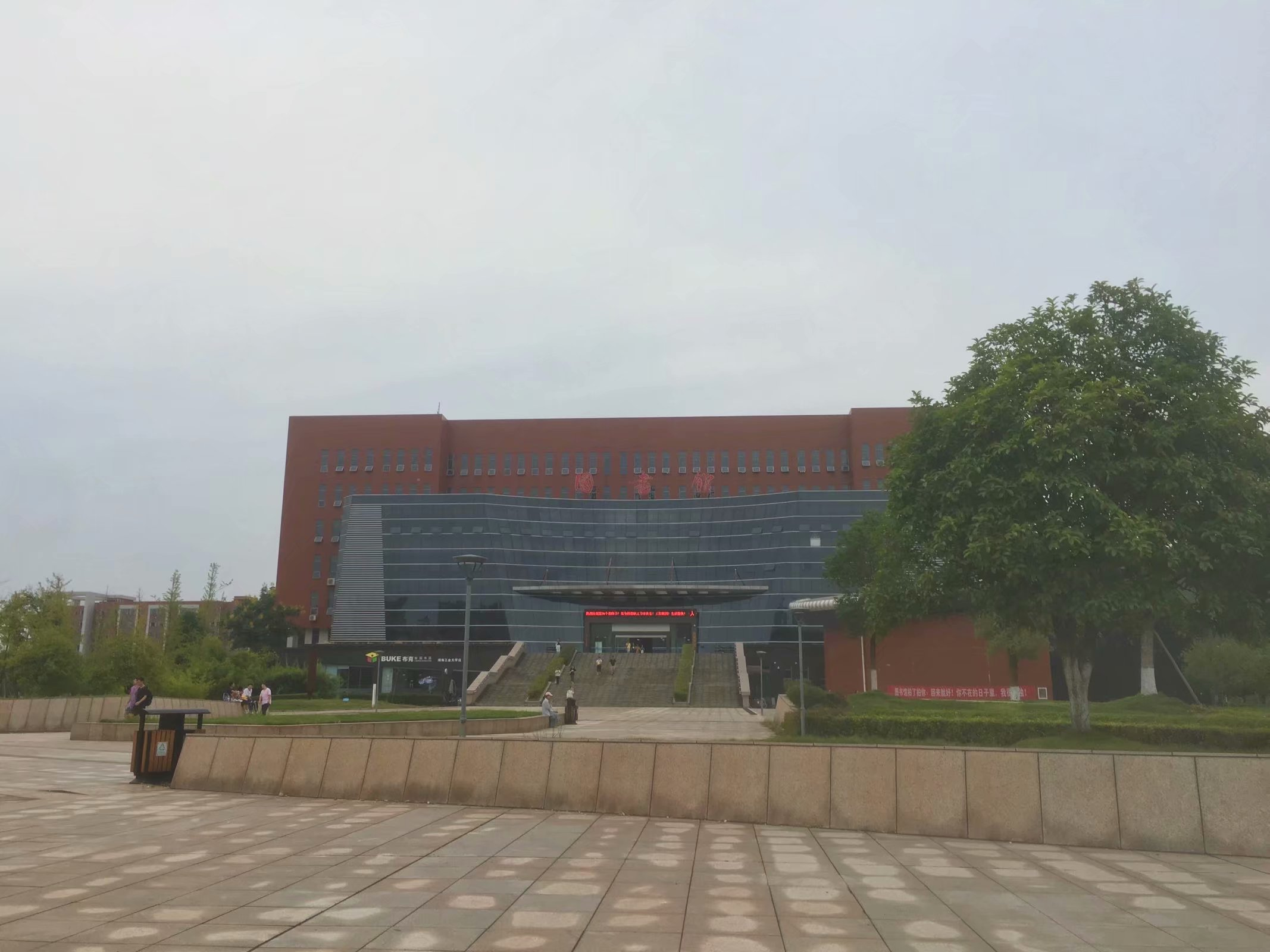
The library of Hunan University of Technology.

HUT was founded in 1979 with the name of Zhuzhou Primary University and then Zhuzhou University. Zhuzhou University changed its name to Zhuzhou Institute of Technology (ZIT) in 1989. In 2006, ZIT changed its name as Hunan University of Technology (HUT) with the approval of the Ministry of Education of China. In the same year, Hunan Metallurgy College and Zhuzhou Normal College merged into the university.

== Academics ==
- School of Packaging Design and Arts
- School of Packaging and Materials Engineering
- School of Mechanical Engineering
- School of Civil Engineering
- School of Electrical and Information Engineering
- School of Computer and Communication
- School of Metallurgical Engineering
- School of Science
- School of Business
- School of Finance and Economics
- School of Law
- School of Literature and Journalism
- School of Foreign Languages
- School of Physical Education
- School of Music
- School of Architecture and Urban Planning
- School of International Education
- Department of Political Studies
- Institute of Science and Technology (Independent Institute)

== Rankings ==
HUT is the only university characterized with the higher education of packaging engineering in China. It is a member of the International Association of Packaging Research Institutes (IAPRI).

As of 2022, the Best Chinese Universities Ranking, also known as the "Shanghai Ranking", placed the university 269th in China. Hunan University of Technology was ranked in the top 901 globally of the 2022 Academic Ranking of World Universities.

== Culture ==
- Motto: 厚德博学、和而不同 Loftiness in the morality Richness in the knowledge Difference in the harmony

== International education ==
HUT has cooperation and provides exchange programs with universities in USA, UK, and Australia.

== Notable alumni ==
- Liu Zhenwu
- Zhou Bohua
