= Hunan Institute of Technology =

Provincial public college in Hengyang, Hunan, China

- 湖南工学院
- Motto: 勤学、务实、圆融、卓越
- Type: Public university
- Established: 2007; 19 years ago
- President: Luo Jianhua (罗建华)
- Academic staff: 1,191 (December 2019)
- Students: 18,716 (December 2019)
- Location: Hengyang, Hunan, China; 26°53′55″N 112°34′18″E
- Campus: 0.93 square kilometres (230 acres)
- Website: www.hnit.edu.cn

The Hunan Institute of Technology (Chinese: 湖南工学院; pinyin: Húnán Gōngxuéyuàn; lit. 'Hunan Engineering College') is a provincial public college in Hengyang, Hunan, China. Despite its English name, the institute has not been granted college status. The college is under the Hunan Provincial Department of Education.

The college consists of 12 colleges, with 30 specialties for undergraduates.

== History ==
Hunan Institute of Technology was originated in 1975—one of the branch: "Hunan college at Hengyang". In 2007, Hunan Institute of Building Materials Industry and "Hunan college at Hengyang" merged and formed the college: Hunan Institute of Technology. The "Hunan Institute of Building Material Industry" was originated from former "Hengyang JiChu college" that was established in 1978 and was approved by both the Government of Hunan Province and the Department of Education of P.R. China.

== Academics ==
- School of Mechanical engineering
- School of Institute of electrical and Information engineering
- School of Computer and Information Sciences
- School of Construction engineering and Art design
- School of Safety and Environmental engineering
- School of Materials and Chemical engineering
- School of Economic management
- School of Foreign languages
- School of Mathematical
- School of Physical education
- School of Political sciences
- School of Continuing education

== Culture ==
- Motto: 勤学、务实、圆融、卓越

== People ==
=== Notable alumni ===
- Liu Anmin
- Wang Yong
- Tang Linka
- Luo Jingming
