= Hunan University of Humanities, Science and Technology =

Provincial public college in Loudi, Hunan, China

- 湖南人文科技学院
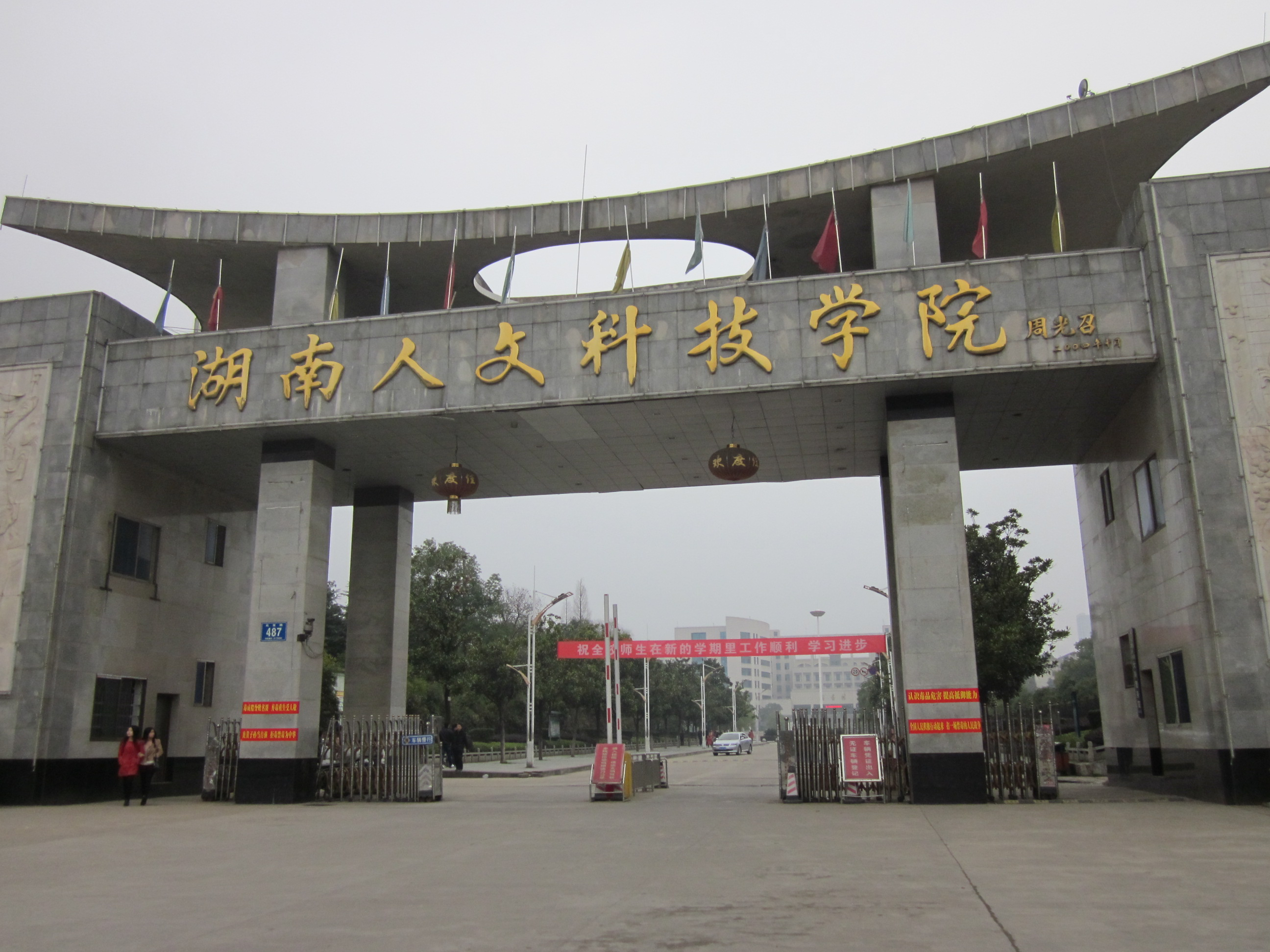
- Motto: 谋近以致远，养根而俟实
- Type: Public college
- Established: 1978; 48 years ago
- President: Liu Heyun (刘和云)
- Academic staff: 853 (October 2019)
- Students: 16,925 (October 2019)
- Location: Loudi, Hunan, China; 27°42′46″N 112°00′23″E
- Campus: Urban
- Website: www.huhst.edu.cn/en/

Chinese name
- Traditional Chinese: 湖南人文科技學院
- Simplified Chinese: 湖南人文科技学院
Transcriptions
Standard Mandarin
- Hanyu Pinyin: Húnán Rénwén Kējì Xuéyuàn

The Hunan University of Humanities, Science and Technology (Chinese: 湖南人文科技学院; lit. 'Hunan Humanities and Technology College') is a provincial public college in Loudi, Hunan, China. Despite its English name, the school has not been granted university status. The college is under the Hunan Provincial Department of Education.
