= Hunan University of Finance and Economics =

Public college in Changsha, Hunan, China

Coordinates: 28°12′21″N 112°55′36″E

- 湖南财政经济学院
- Motto: 正德厚生、经世济用
- Type: Public college
- Established: 1933; 92 years ago
- President: Liu Changgeng (刘长庚)
- Academic staff: 729 (December 2018)
- Students: 12,000 (December 2018)
- Location: Changsha, Hunan, China
- Campus: 760.35 mu
- Website: www.hufe.edu.cn

The Hunan University of Finance and Economics (Chinese: 湖南财政经济学院; pinyin: Húnán Caízhèng Jīngjì Xuéyuàn) is a public college in Yuelu, Changsha, Hunan, China.

== History ==
The university was founded in April 1933. It was initially called "Housheng Private Accounting Institute".

In February 2010, it was renamed to "Hunan College of Finance and Economics".

As of fall 2013, the university has one campus, a combined student body of 9,000 students, 500 faculty members.

== Academics ==
The university consists of one college and seven departments, with 36 specialties for undergraduates. The university covers a total area of 846 mu, with more than 300,000 square meters of floor space.

- School of Adult education
- Department of Accounting
- Department of Fiscal Finance
- Department of Information Management
- Department of Business Administration
- Department of Law and Public Administration
- Department of Foreign Languages
- Department of Engineering Management

== Rankings ==
As of 2023, Hunan University of Finance and Economics ranked 2nd in Hunan and 40th nationwide among universities specialized in finance, business, and economics in the recent edition of the recognized Best Chinese Universities Ranking. The university ranked # 12,316 in the world out of more than 30,000 universities worldwide by the Webometrics Ranking Web of Universities 2023.

== Library collections ==
Hunan College of Finance and Economics's total collections amount to more than 920,000 items.

== Culture ==
- Motto: 正德厚生、经世济用
