= Jishou University =

University in Jishou, China

- 吉首大学
- Motto: 以人名校，以业报国
- Type: Public university
- Established: 1958; 68 years ago
- President: Liao Zhikun (廖志坤)
- Academic staff: 1,000 (2019)
- Students: 30,000 (2019)
- Location: Jishou and Zhangjiajie, Hunan, China; 28°17′15″N 109°43′19″E
- Campus: Urban
- Website: www.jsu.edu.cn

Chinese name
- Simplified Chinese: 吉首大学
- Traditional Chinese: 吉首大學
Transcriptions
Standard Mandarin
- Hanyu Pinyin: Jíshǒu Dàxué

Jishou University (Chinese: 吉首大学; sometimes abbreviated as JSU) is a university located in Jishou, Hunan, China.

The university consists of 23 colleges, with 71 specialties for undergraduates, 2 specialties for the second bachelor's degree. At present, the university has 15 provincial engineering research centres and 4 provincial key laboratories.

== History ==
Jishou University was formed in April 1958 by the CPC Government of the Xiangxi Tujia and Miao Autonomous Prefecture and was initially called "Jishou College".

In August 1978, Hunan Medical University and Xiangtan University, Xiangxi merged into the university.

In August 2000, Jishou Health College merged into the university.

In October 2002, Wuling College merged into the university.

== Academics ==
- School of Chemistry and Chemical Engineering
- School of Tourism
- School of Biological Resources and Environmental Science
- School of Business
- School of Mathematics and Computer Science
- School of Physical Education
- School of Foreign Languages
- School of Physical Science and Information Engineering
- School of Literature and Journalism
- School of Medical
- School of Music and Dance
- School of Law
- School of Political Science and Public Administration
- School of History and Culture
- School of Art
- School of Information Management and Engineering
- School of Town Planning and Urban Planning
- School of International Exchange
- School of Continuing Education
- School of Marxism
- School of Public Languages
- School of Preceptors
- School of Computer General Course
- School of Modern Educational Technology
- Zhangjiajie College

== Faculty and students ==
Jishou University has more than 1,800 faculty and staff members, including over 1,200 full-time teachers, among whom more than 700 hold senior professional titles. Nearly 800 faculty members serve as doctoral or master's supervisors. The university has a total enrollment of over 30,000 students, including more than 25,000 on-campus undergraduate, master's, doctoral, and international students.

== Library collections ==
Jishou University Library's total collection amounts to more than 2.3 million items.

== Culture ==
- Motto: 以人名校，以业报国
- College newspaper: Journal of Jishou University

== Rankings ==
The Best Chinese Universities Ranking, also known as the "Shanghai Ranking", placed the university 294th in China. The university ranked # 1840 in the world out of nearly 30,000 universities worldwide by the University Rankings by Academic Performance 2023–2024.

== People ==
=== Notable alumni ===
- Yang Zhengwu, Hunan Provincial Party Committee Secretary.
- Wu Yunchang, Governor of Xiangxi Tujia and Miao Autonomous Prefecture.
- Peng Xueming, writer, scholar, commentator.
- He Xu, chief editor of Xingchen Online, editor of Changsha Evening News.
- Yao Ziheng, editor and writer.
- He Tu, musician producer and singer.
