= Hunan International Economics University =

Private college in Changsha, Hunan, China

Coordinates: 28°12′08″N 112°57′05″E

- 湖南涉外经济学院
- Motto: 至善至美，自立自强
- Type: Private college
- Established: 1997; 29 years ago
- President: Wang yaozhong (王耀中)
- Academic staff: 1,614
- Students: 26,158
- Location: Changsha, Hunan, China
- Campus: 1,700 mu
- Website: www.hieu.edu.cn

Hunan International Economics University
- Simplified Chinese: 湖南涉外经济学院
- Traditional Chinese: 湖南涉外經濟學院
Transcriptions
Standard Mandarin
- Hanyu Pinyin: Húnán Shèwài Jīngjì Xuéyuàn

Hunan International Economics University (Chinese: 湖南涉外经济学院; pinyin: Húnán Shèwaì Jīngjì Xuéyuàn) is a private college located in Yuelu, Changsha, Hunan, China. Despite its English name, the school has not been granted university status.

As of fall 2013, the university has one campus, a combined student body of 26,158 students and 1,614 faculty members. The university consists of 11 colleges, with 41 specialties for undergraduates. The university covers a total area of 1,700 mu, with more than 427,600 square meters of floor space.

== History ==
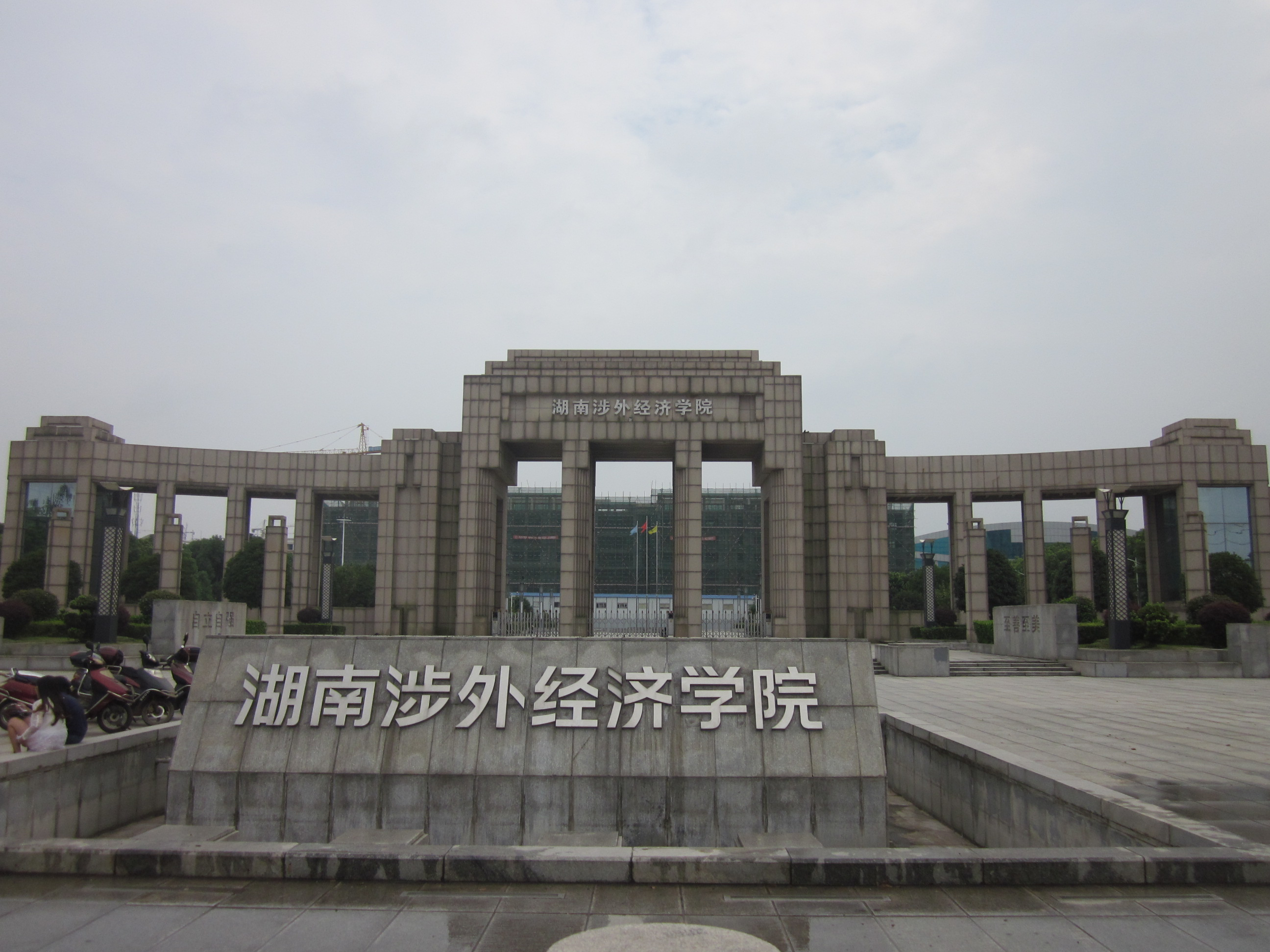
The school gate.

The university was founded in 1997. It was initially called "Xiangnan College of Letters and Science".

In 1998, it was renamed "Hunan International Economics University".

== Academics ==
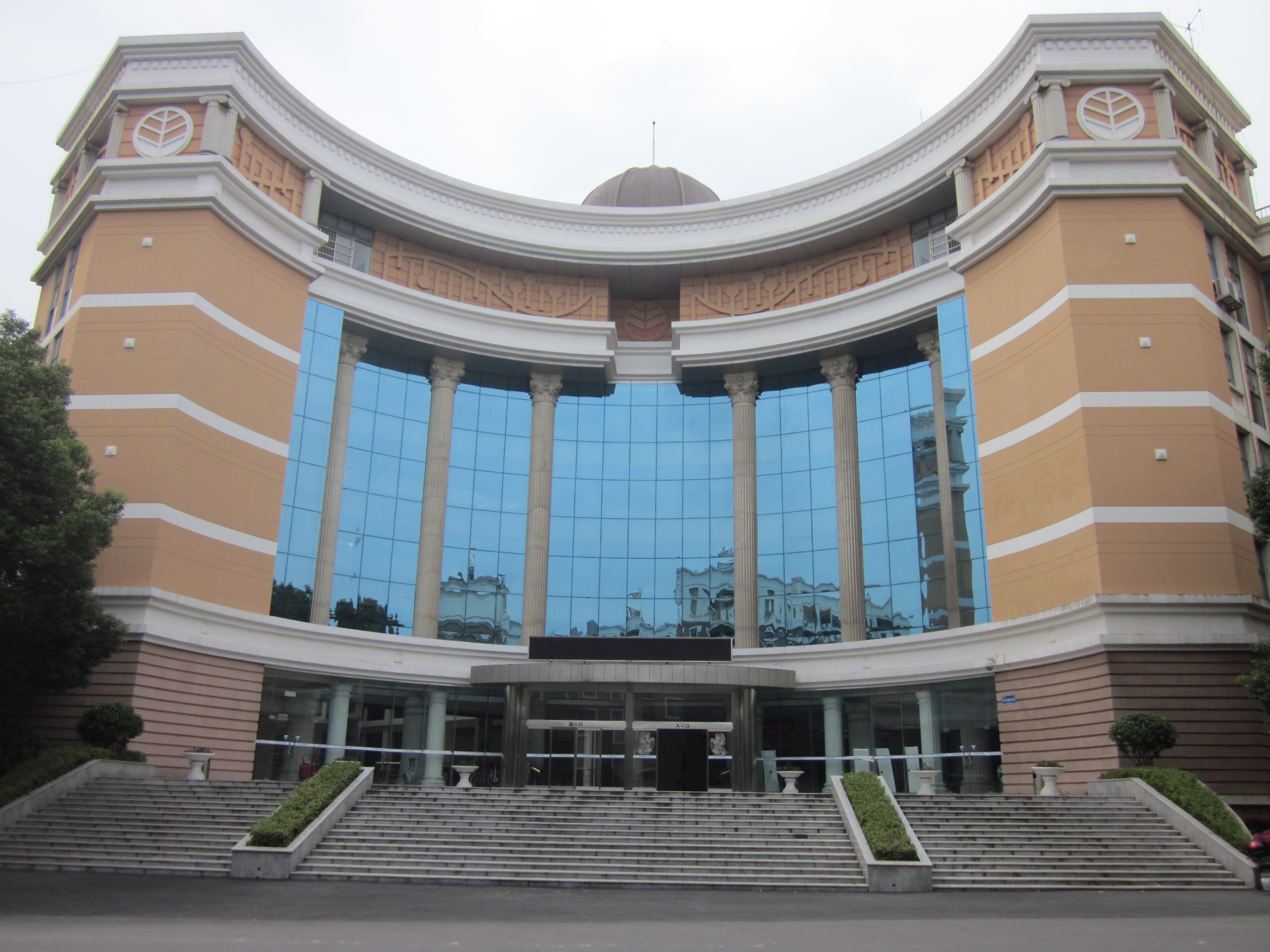
Hunan International Economics University Library.

- School of Business
- School of Management
- School of Humanity and Law
- School of Physical Culture
- School of Foreign Languages
- School of Mechanical Engineering
- School of Information Science and Engineering
- School of Art and Design
- School of Music
- School of Continuing Education
- Laureate International School
