= Hunan University of Science and Engineering =

Provincial public college in Yongzhou, Hunan, China

- 湖南科技学院
- Motto: 德才兼备，自强不息
- Type: Public college
- Established: 1941; 85 years ago
- President: Li Gang (李钢)
- Academic staff: 1,211 (October 2019)
- Students: 15,149 (October 2019)
- Location: Yongzhou, Hunan, 425199, China; 26°12′34″N 111°36′15″E
- Campus: 1,300 mu
- Colors: Purple; Gold
- Website: www.huse.edu.cn

The Hunan University of Science and Engineering (Chinese: 湖南科技学院; pinyin: Húnán Kējì Xuéyuàn) is a provincial public college in Yongzhou, Hunan, China with university status. The college is under the Hunan Provincial Department of Education.

The university consists of 16 departments, with 38 specialties for undergraduates.

== History ==
Hunan University of Science and Engineering was formed in 1941, it was initially called "Hunan Provincial Seventh Normal School".

In 1971, it started a college education.

In 1981, it renamed "Lingling Normal College" (零陵师专).

In 2002, it upgraded to undergraduate education.

In 2004, Lingling College renamed "Hunan University of Science and Engineering".

== Academics ==
- Department of Music
- Department of Art
- Department of Law
- Department of Physical
- Department of Electronic engineering
- Department of Journalism and Communication
- Department of Chinese language and Literature
- Department of Civil Engineering and Construction management
- Department of English language
- Department of Mathematics and Computer Science
- Department of Economic management
- Department of Information Technology and Education
- Department of Life Science and Chemical Engineering
- Department of Computer communication engineering
- Department of Political science

== Culture ==
- Motto:德才兼备，自强不息
