= Hunan Institute of Science and Technology =

Public college in Yueyang, Hunan, China

Coordinates: 29°20′47″N 113°09′09″E

- 湖南理工大学
- Motto: 至善穷理
- Type: Public college
- Established: 2004; 22 years ago
- President: Lu Xianming (卢先明)
- Faculty: 1,000 (September 2019)
- Students: 17,000 (September 2019)
- Location: Yueyang, Hunan, China
- Campus: Urban
- Website: en.hnist.cn

The Hunan Institute of Science and Technology (Chinese: 湖南理工大学; pinyin: Húnán Lǐgōng Dàxué) is a provincial public college in Yueyang, Hunan, China. The institute has not been granted university status. The college is under the Hunan Provincial Department of Education.
