= Hunan City University =

Provincial public college in Yiyang, Hunan, China

- 湖南城市学院
- Motto: 品学兼修，知行统一
- Type: Public college
- Established: 1970; 56 years ago
- President: Li Jianqi (李建奇)
- Academic staff: 1,108 (August 2018)
- Students: 18,600 (August 2018)
- Location: Yiyang, Hunan, China; 28°32′40″N 112°23′16″E
- Campus: 1868 mu
- Website: www.hncu.net

Hunan City University (Chinese: 湖南城市学院; pinyin: Húnán Chéngshì Xuéyuàn; lit. 'Hunan City College') is a provincial public college in Yiyang, Hunan, China. Despite its English name, the institute has not been granted university status. The college is under the Hunan Provincial Department of Education.

As of fall 2019, the university has 2 campuses, a combined student body of 18,600 students and 1,108 faculty members.

The university consists of 15 colleges, with 40 specialties for undergraduates.

== History ==
Hunan City University was founded in 1970, it was initially called "Yiyang Normal College".

In November 1976, it was renamed "Hunan Normal College, Yiyang".

In 2002, Hunan City College and Yiyang Normal College merged into Hunan City University.

== Academics ==
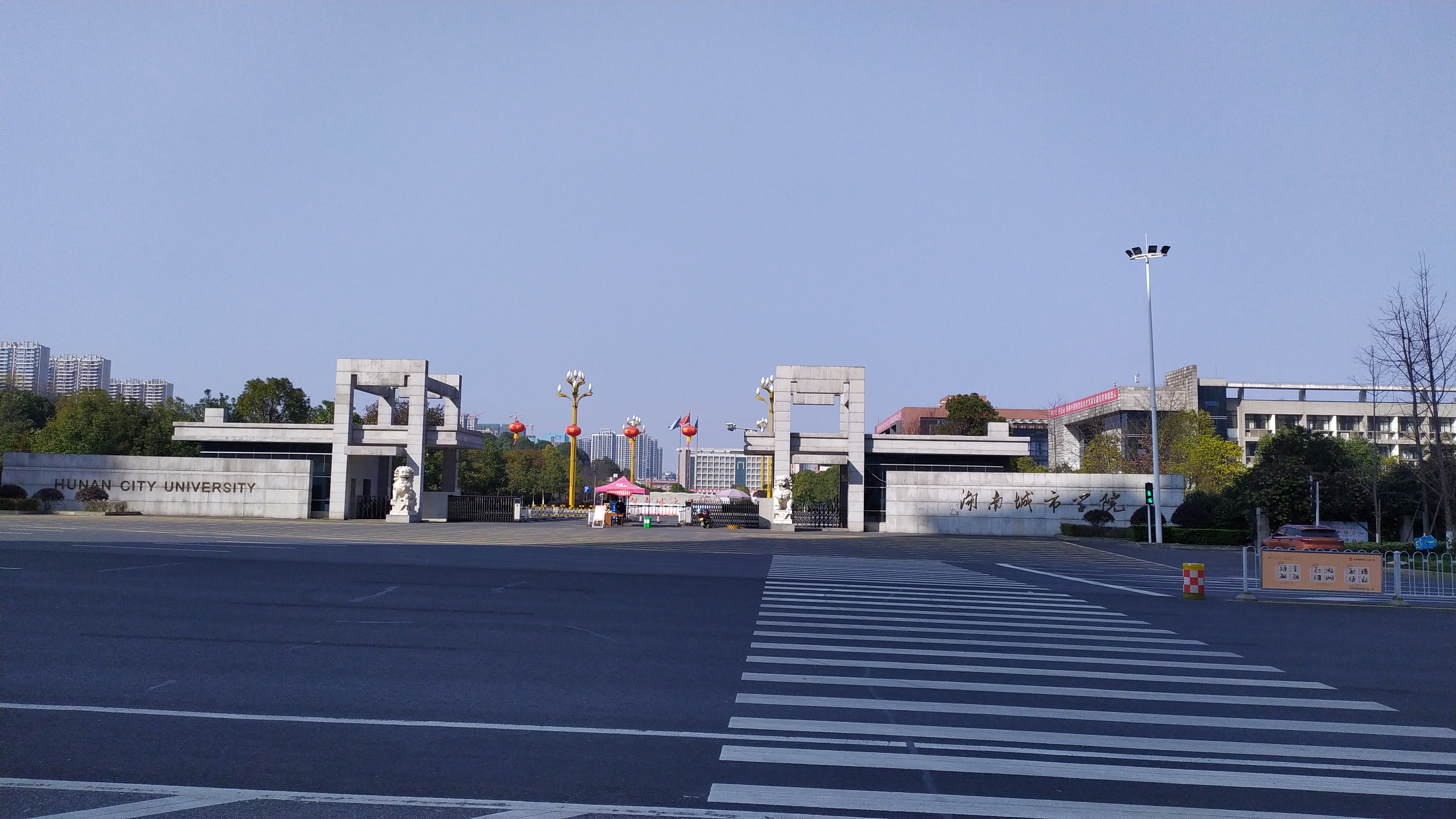
A panoramic view of the school gate of Hunan City University.

- School of Civil Engineering
- School of Architecture and Urban Planning
- School of Municipal and Surveying and Mapping Engineering
- School of City Management
- School of Information Science and Engineering
- School of Arts
- School of Foreign Languages
- School of Communication and Electronic Engineering
- School of Chemistry and Environmental Engineering
- School of Physical
- School of Music
- School of Art and Artistic Designing
- School of Marxism
- School of Business
- School of Mathematics
- School of Computer Science

== Library collections ==
Hunan City University's total collection amounts to more than 1.53 million items.

== Culture ==
- Motto: 品学兼修，知行统一
