= Xiangtan University =

Provincial public university in Xiangtan, Hunan, China

- 湘潭大学
- Motto: 博学笃行 盛德日新
- Motto in English: Knowledge, Action and Virtue
- Type: Public
- Established: 1958; 68 years ago
- President: Li Bochao (李伯超)
- Academic staff: 1,488 (2019)
- Students: 37,057 (2019)
- Postgraduates: 6,770 (2019)
- Location: Xiangtan, Hunan, China; 27°53′17″N 112°52′14″E
- Campus: 1,703,651m^{2}
- Colors: Blue; Red
- Website: xtu.edu.cn en.xtu.edu.cn

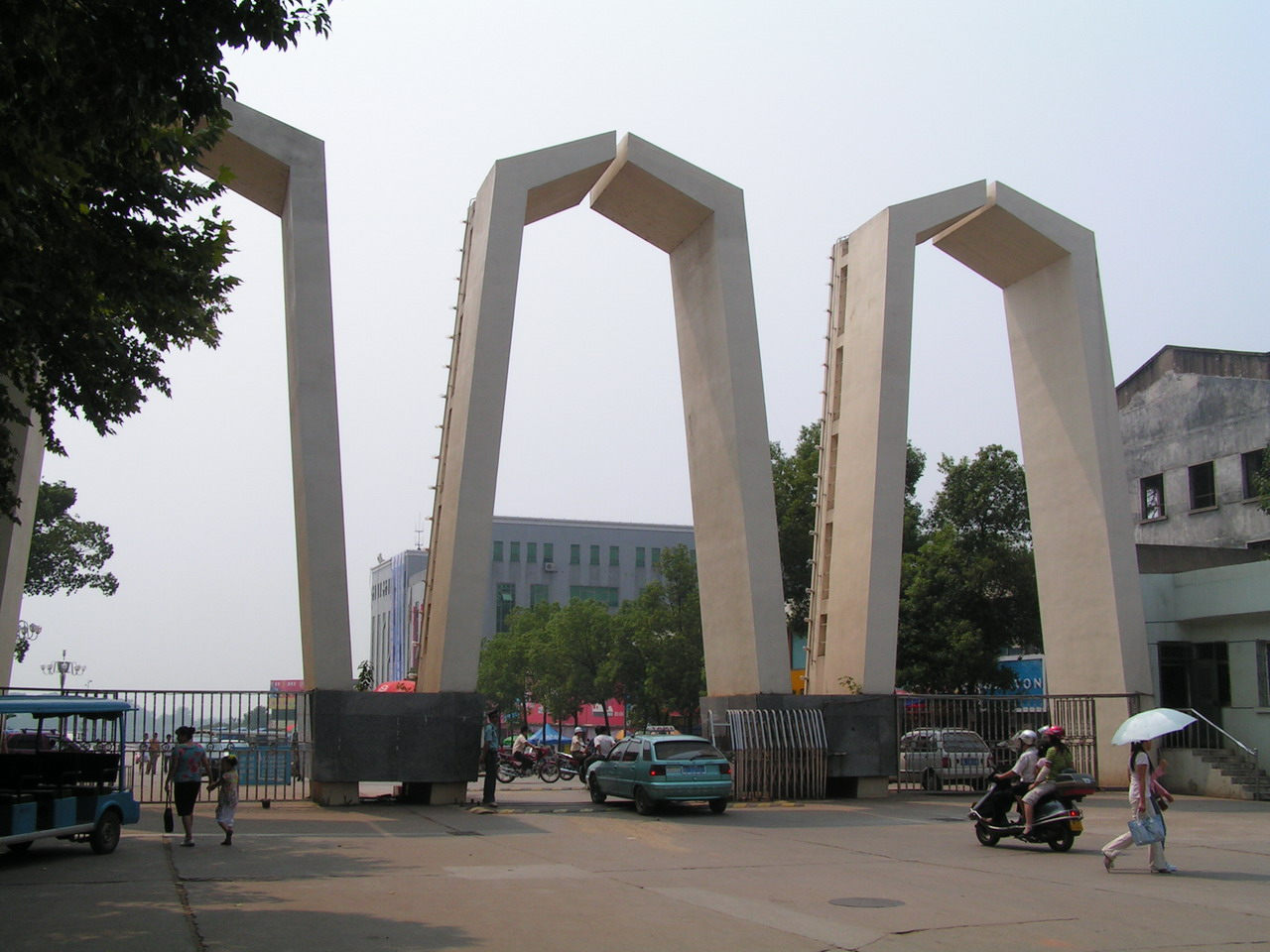
The university gate

Xiangtan University (XTU; 湘潭大学) is a provincial public university in Xiangtan, Hunan, China. It is affiliated with the province of Hunan, and co-funded by the Hunan Provincial People's Government, the Ministry of Education of China, and SASTIND. The university is part of the Double First-Class Construction.

== History ==
In 1958, under the proposal of Mao Zedong, Xiangtan University was founded in Xiangtan County of Hunan Province, where Mao Zedong was born and grew up. The university ceased to run by the order of the provincial government in 1959 and ultimately recovered the university operation in 1974.

== Rankings ==
University rankings

Global – Overall
- ARWU World: 701 (2025)
- CWUR World: 849 (2025)
- CWTS World: 575 (2024)
- THE World: 801 (2018)

=== General Rankings ===
As of 2025, the Best Chinese Universities Ranking, also known as the "Shanghai Ranking", placed the Xiangtan University the best in Xiangtan and 4th in Hunan (the only university among the top 5 in the province located outside Changsha, the capital of Hunan).

As of 2025, the Academic Ranking of World Universities placed Xiangtan University # 701-800th globally.

In 2017, Times Higher Education ranked the university top 800–1000 in the world. Xiangtan University was ranked in the top 1000 universities in the world by a number of international rankings including the Academic Ranking of World Universities, the Times Higher Education, and the Center for World University Rankings (CWUR).

=== Research and Subject Rankings ===
The 2024 CWTS Leiden Ranking ranked Xiangtan University at 575th in the world based on their publications for the period 2019–2022. The Nature Index Annual Tables 2025 by Nature Research ranked Xiangtan University among the top 350 leading universities globally for the high quality of research publications in natural science.

Subjects ranking by	2025 Global Ranking
U.S. News & World Report Best Global University Ranking
Chemical Engineering	# 220
Mathematics	# 229
Environmental Engineering	# 236
Nanoscience and Nanotechnology	# 271
Physical Chemistry	# 302
Energy and Fuels	# 330
Material Science	# 389
Chemistry	# 562
Electrical and Electronic Engineering	# 589
Computer Science	# 670
Engineering	# 701
Physics	# 830
Academic Ranking of World Universities (ARWU)
Chemical Engineering	101-150
Metallurgical Engineering	151-200
Energy Science & Engineering	201-300
Mathematics	201-300
Nanoscience & Nanotechnology	201-300
Materials Science & Engineering	301-400
Chemistry	401-500
