= Hunan Women's University =

Public college in Changsha, Hunan, China

- 湖南女子学院
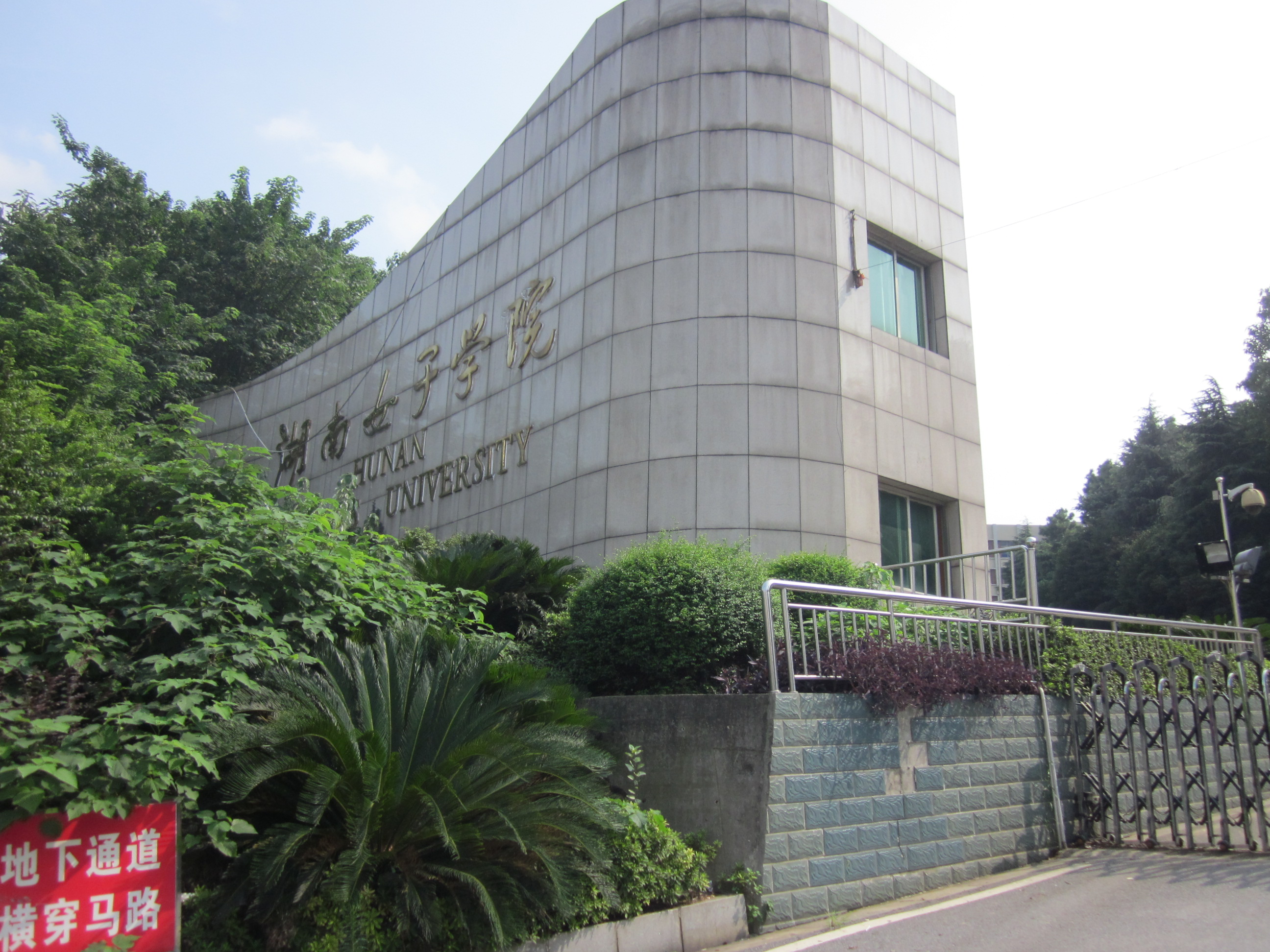
- The gate
- Former names: Hunan Women's Vocational College
- Motto: 懿德睿智，笃行臻美
- Type: Public college
- Established: 1985; 41 years ago
- President: Yang Lanying (杨兰英)
- Academic staff: 651 (October 2018)
- Students: 9,040 (October 2018)
- Location: Changsha, Hunan, China
- Campus: 577 mu
- Website: english.hnwu.edu.cn

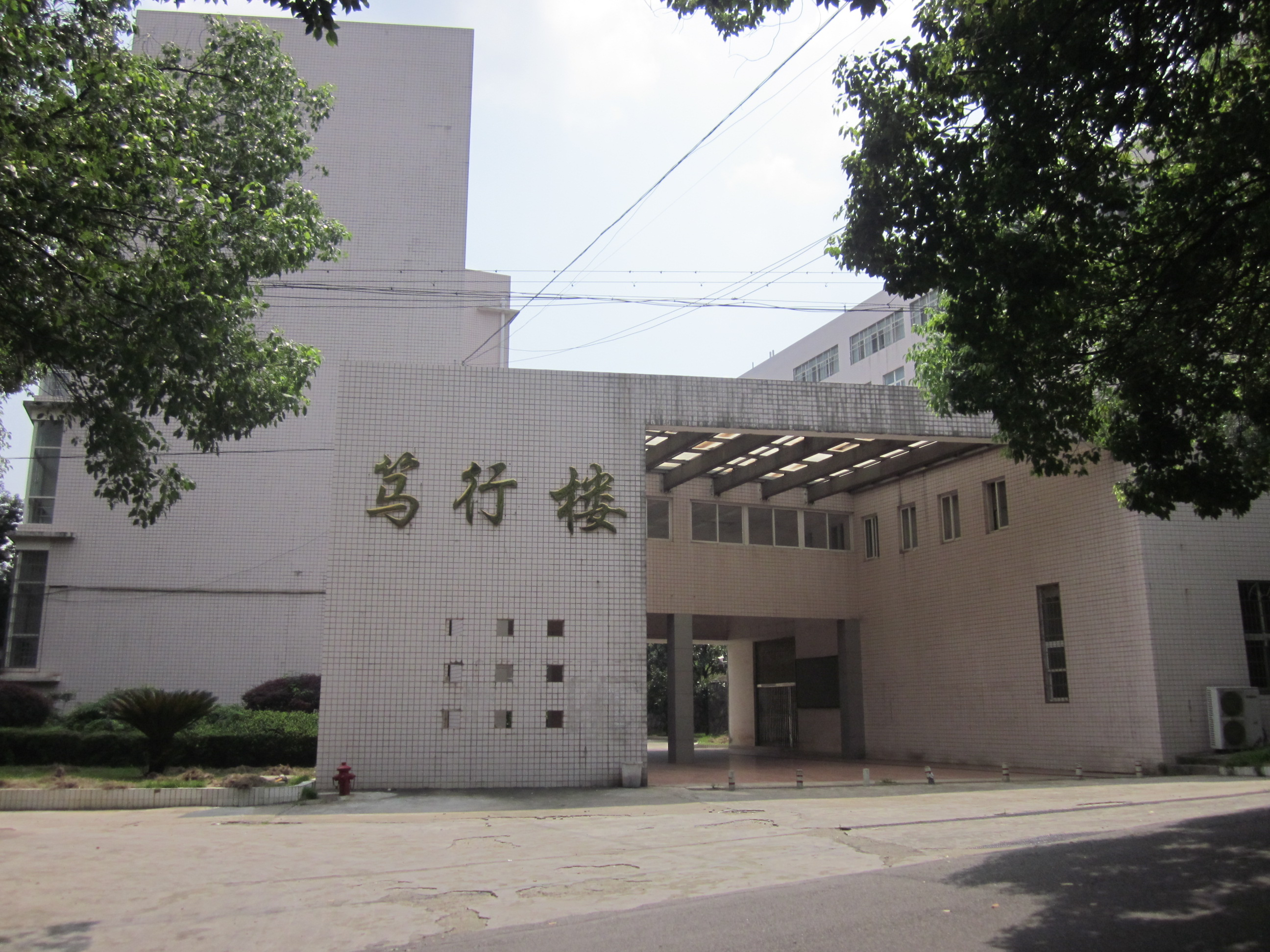
Duxing Building.

Hunan Women's University (Chinese: 湖南女子学院; pinyin: Húnán Nǚzǐ Xuéyuàn) is a public college in Yuhua, Changsha, Hunan, China. The college is under the Hunan Provincial Department of Education.

As of fall 2013, the university has one campus, a combined student body of 9,500 students, 524 faculty members. The university consists of 4 colleges and 9 departments, with 24 specialties for undergraduates. The university covers a total area of 577 mu, with more than 200,000 square meters of floor space.

== History ==
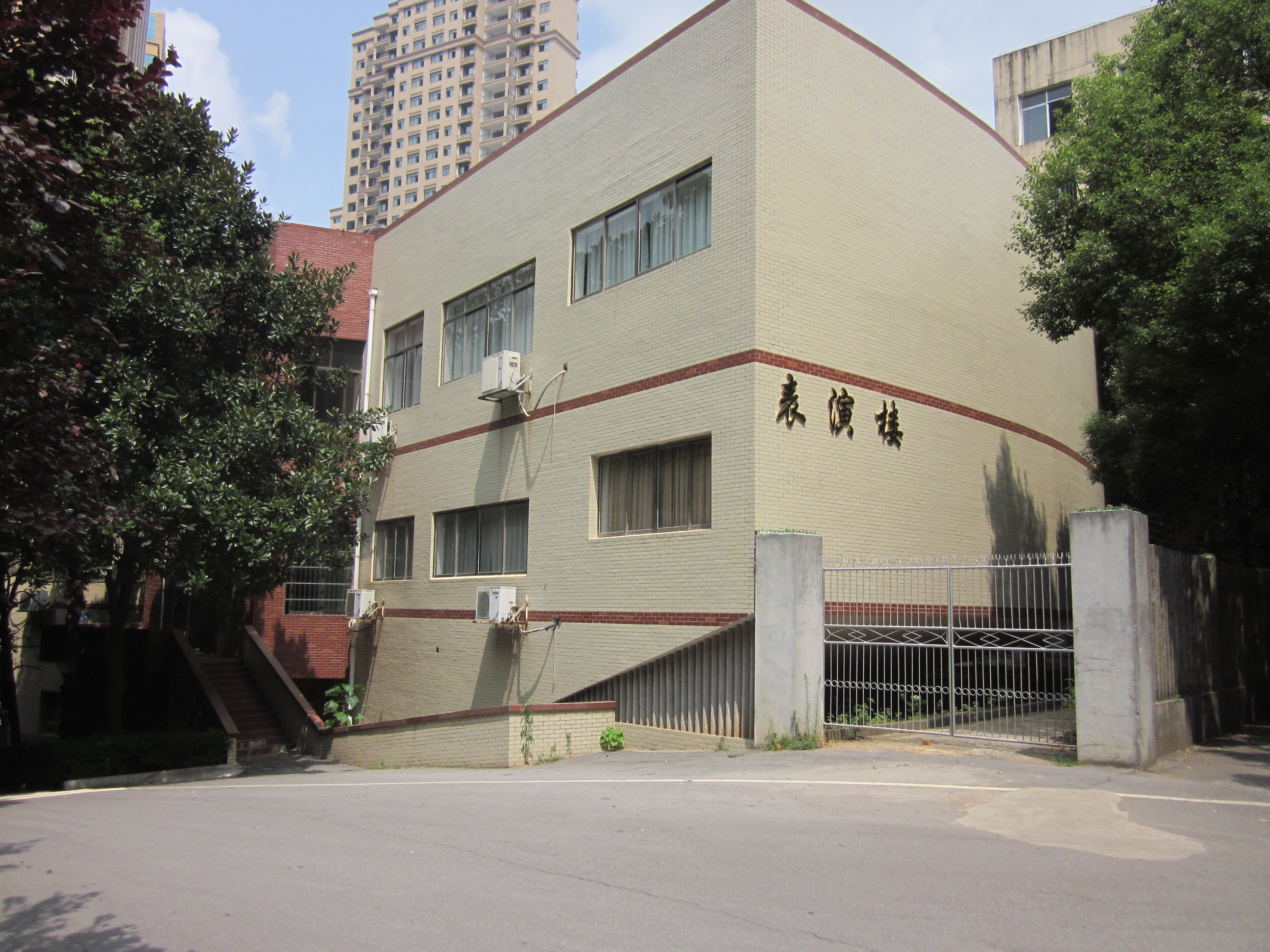
Teaching building.

Hunan Women's University was founded in 1985. It was initially called "Hunan Women's Vocational College".

On March 18, 2010, it was renamed "Hunan Women's University".
