= Hunan University of Technology and Business =

Public university in Changsha, China

Coordinates: 28°13′37″N 112°55′10″E

- 湖南工商大学
- Motto: 至诚至信 为实为新
- Type: Public
- Established: 26 December 1949; 77 years ago
- Affiliations: Hunan Education Department
- President: Chen Xiaohong (陈晓红)
- Academic staff: 1,646 (April 2018)
- Students: 16,000 (April 2018)
- Location: Changsha, Hunan, China
- Campus: 1340.61 mu

Chinese name
- Traditional Chinese: 湖南工商大學
- Simplified Chinese: 湖南工商大学
Transcriptions
Standard Mandarin
- Hanyu Pinyin: Húnán Gōngshāng Dàxué

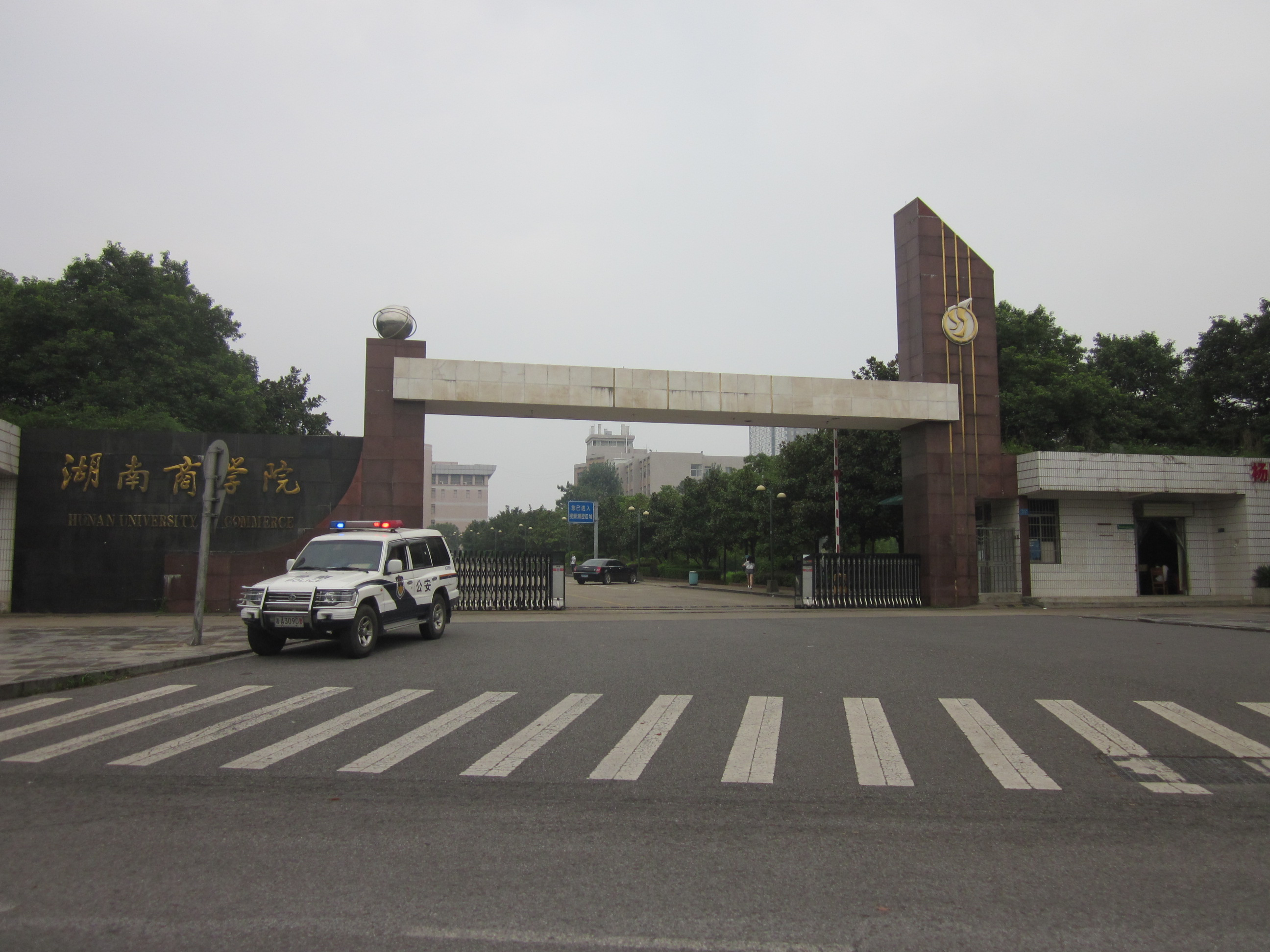
The school gate.

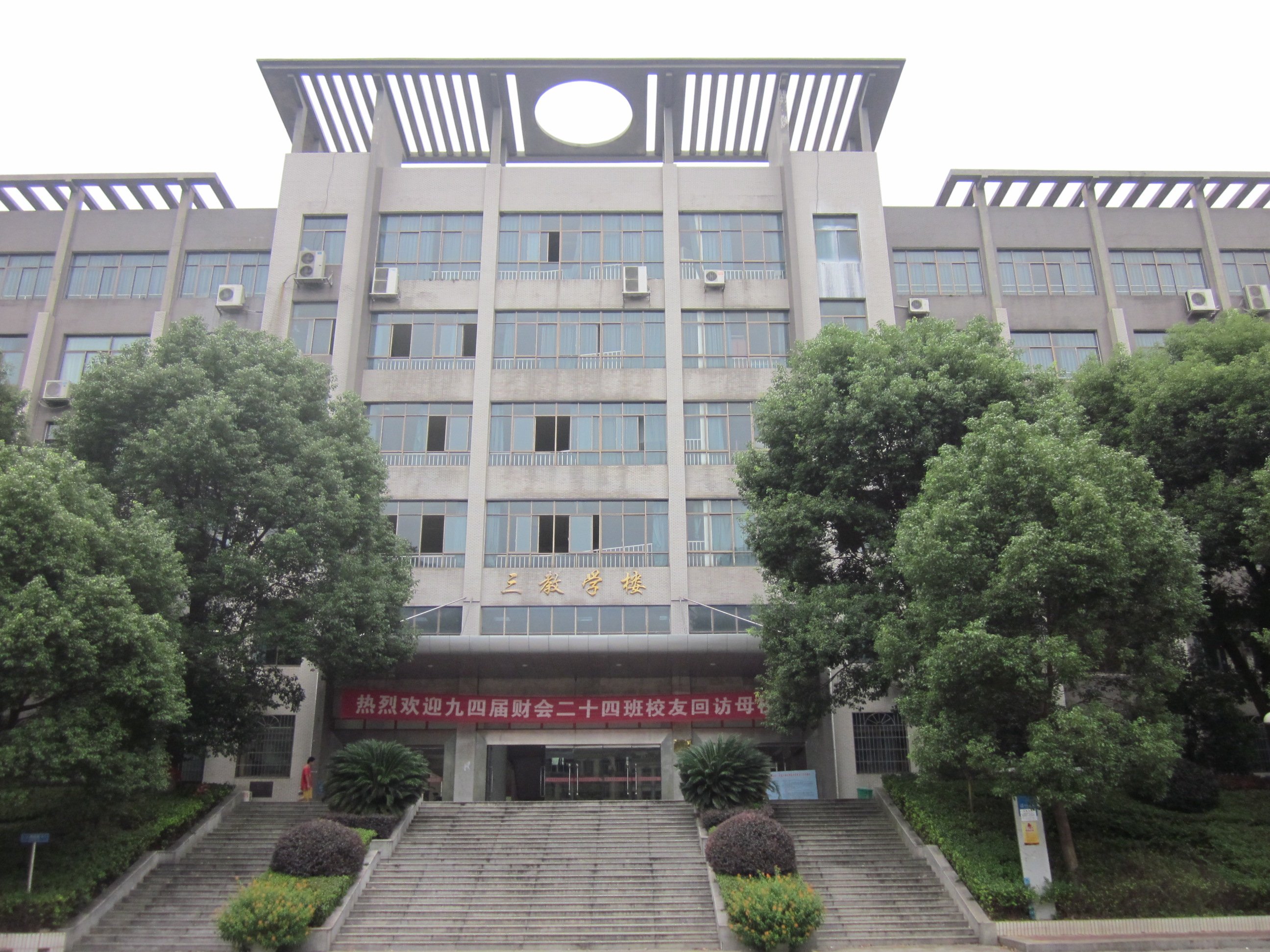
The teaching building.

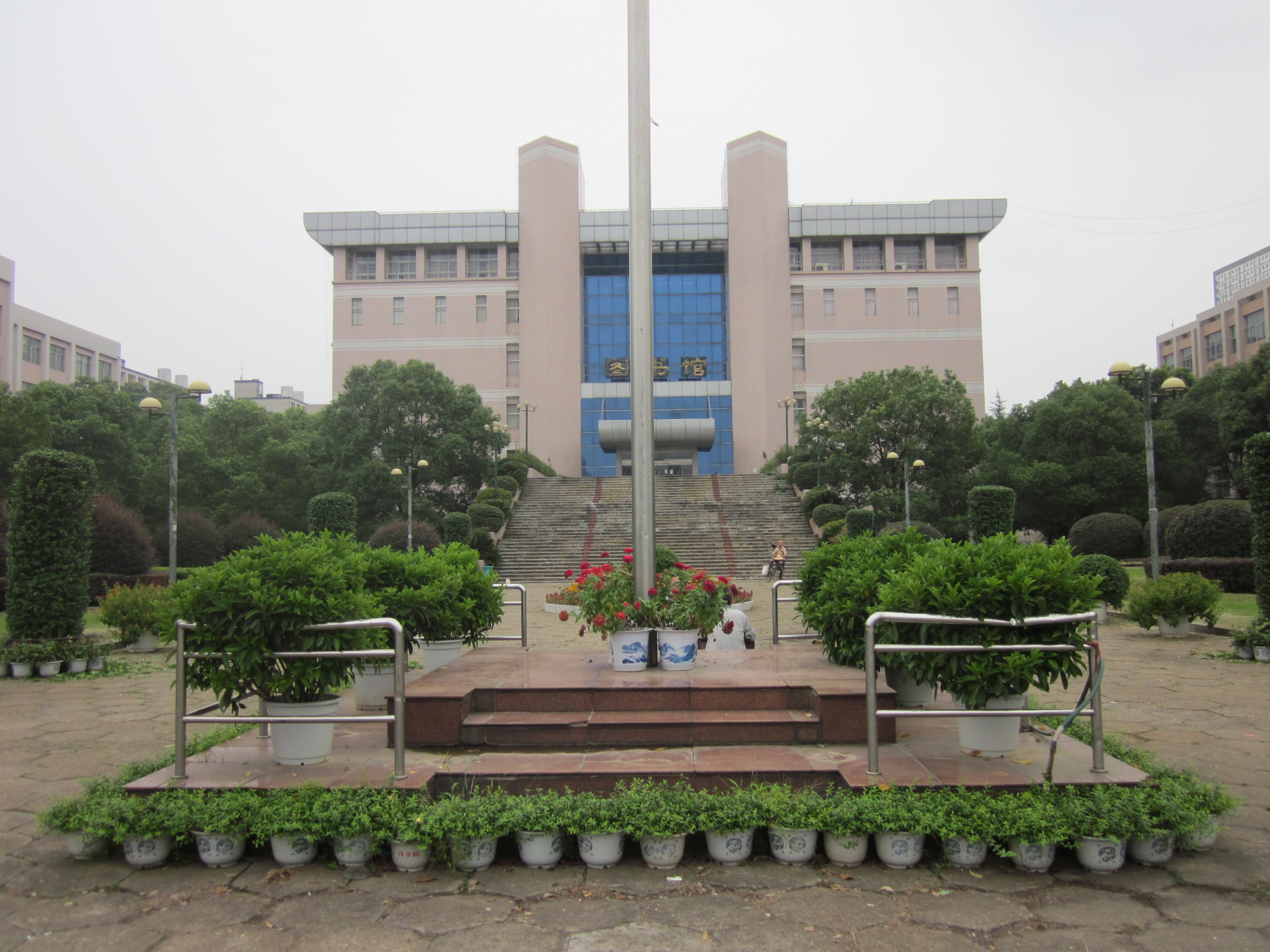
The library.

The Hunan University of Technology and Business (HUTB, Chinese: 湖南工商大学) is a provincial public university located in Changsha, Hunan, China.

HUTB offers degrees from undergraduate, master's programs, and doctoral degree program. As of 2023, Hunan University of Technology and Business ranked the best in Hunan and 23rd nationwide among universities specialized in finance, business, and economics in the recent edition of the recognized Best Chinese Universities Ranking.

== History ==
HUC was established in 1949 by combining two colleges: Hunan Business College and Hunan Business Management College. It was renamed Hunan University of Commerce in 2007.

HUC has by now been developed into a multi-disciplinary and multi-level college, including four-year education, three-year education and adult education. In 2008, HUC started to grant Master's degrees. It consists of 17 teaching units in the forms of schools or departments and 18 research institutes. Currently, 26 bachelor's degree programs are offered and over 11,000 full-time and part-time students are enrolled on campus.

== Rankings ==
As of 2023, Hunan University of Technology and Business ranked the best in Hunan and 23rd nationwide among universities specialized in finance, business, and economics in the recent edition of the recognized Best Chinese Universities Ranking. Hunan University of Technology and Business ranked # 2176 in the world out of nearly 30,000 universities worldwide by the University Ranking by Academic Performance 2023–2024.

== School and departments ==
School and departments

- Economy and Trade Development Research Center
- Beijing School
- School of Finance
- School of Law
- School of Business Management
- School of Public Management
- School of Accounting
- School of Computer and Electronic Engineering
- School of continuing education
- School of Economy and Trade
- School of Tourism Management
- School of Arts Design
- Department of Physical Education
- School of Foreign Languages
- School of Information
- School of Chinese Language and Literature
- School of International Studies
