= Changsha University of Science and Technology =

Provincial public university in Changsha, Hunan, China

- 长沙理工大学
- Motto: 博学 力行 守正 拓新
- Type: Public
- Established: 1956; 70 years ago
- President: Cao Yijia (曹一家)
- Faculty: 1,986 (November 2019)
- Students: 39,000 (November 2019)
- Undergraduates: 5,600 (November 2019)
- Location: Changsha, Hunan, China
- Campus: Urban
- Website: csust.edu.cn

The Changsha University of Science and Technology (CSUST; 长沙理工大学) is a provincial public university in Changsha, Hunan, China. The university is affiliated with the Province of Hunan, and co-sponsored by the provincial government and the Ministry of Transport of China.

As of 2022, the Best Chinese Universities Ranking, also known as the "Shanghai Ranking", placed the university 5th in Hunan.

== History ==
Established in 1956, Changsha University of Science and Technology (CSUST) is an engineering-centered multidisciplinary university, offering engineering, science, management, economics, liberal arts and law. The university offers undergraduate, master's, and doctoral degree programs, and operates post-doctoral science and research workstations. It has been designated the "National Excellent Grassroots Party Organization" and "Hunan Provincial Model Unit of Civility".

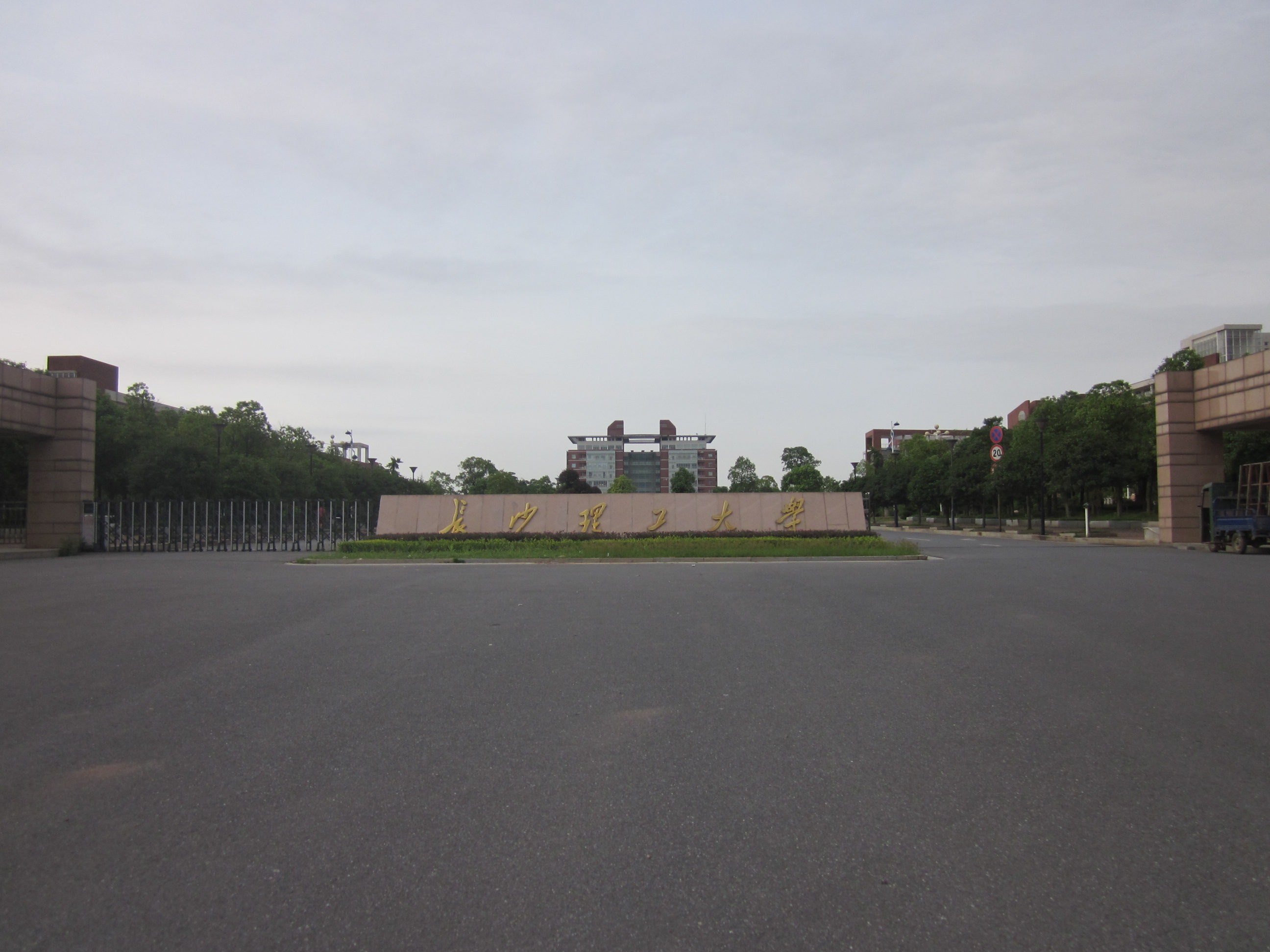
The school gate.

Ever since the founding of the university, it has nurtured nearly 200,000 graduates, serving mainly in transportation, power industry, hydrological industry and light industry, making their contributions to regional and social economic development.

== Description ==
The university has 16 teaching schools (departments), 1 independent college and 1 continuous education college and enrolls students from 31 provinces (municipalities and autonomous regions) in China. It now has a registered full-time undergraduates of over 30,000 PhD and Master's degree candidates of around 4,700. It sets up 30 undergraduate majors, 2 post-doctoral workstations, 3 disciplines and 15 sub-disciplines for doctoral degrees, 20 disciplines and 105 sub-disciplines for master's degrees, 7 professional degree authorizations. It is accredited to confer master's degrees to those with equivalent academic attainments. The university has 27 natural sciences innovation platforms, such as national engineering laboratories, science and technology innovation teams, key laboratories at provincial or ministerial level and engineering research centers; 10 provincial philosophy and social sciences innovation platforms, 11 key disciplines at provincial or ministerial level, 17 undergraduate teaching projects, such as national talents cultivation innovative pilot, teaching contingents, experiment (practice) teaching centers, disciplines with characteristics, elaborate courses and bilingual education demonstration courses.

The university is located on Jinpenling and Yuntang Campuses, with an area of 210.56 hectares and a total floor space of 1,170,000 square meters. The university has fixed assets totaling 2.4 billion yuan, among which the apparatus and equipment for teaching and research are valued at 300 million yuan. The university has a collection of more than 2,960,000 books, 3192 kinds of domestic and international periodicals and 4285GB EBooks. A gigabit backbone networking system and part of the network core systems have been set up. Multimedia classrooms and language laboratories can seat 16,642 students. The playground covers an area of 213,700 square meters, including an indoor space of 34,500 square meters.

== Rankings and reputation ==
University rankings

Global – Overall
- ARWU World: 701-800 (2022)
- THE World: 501 (2023)
- USNWR Global: 372 (2023)

Regional – Overall
- USNWR Asia: 69 (2023)

National – Overall
- USNWR National: 36 (2023)

As of 2022, the Best Chinese Universities Ranking, also known as the "Shanghai Ranking", placed the university 5th in Hunan. As of 2021, Changsha University of Science and Technology was ranked 701-800 globally by the Academic Ranking of World Universities (ARWU). As of 2022, Changsha University of Science and Technology ranked 36th in China, 69th in Asia and 372nd globally by the U.S. News & World Report Best Global University Ranking.

Subjects ranking	2023 Global Ranking by ARWU
Civil Engineering	101-150
Instruments Science & Technology	101-150
Transportation Science & Technology	151-200
Chemical Engineering	201-300
Computer Science & Engineering	201-300
Energy Science & Engineering	201-300
Food Science & Technology	201-300
Mathematics	201-300
Mechanical Engineering	201-300
Telecommunication Engineering	201-300
Electrical & Electronic Engineering	301-400
Materials Science & Engineering	301-400
Chemistry	401-500
Earth Sciences	401-500
Economics	401-500

Subjects ranking	2023 Global Ranking by US News
Civil Engineering	65
Electrical & Electronic Engineering	167
Materials Science & Engineering	180
Engineering	250
Computer Science & Engineering	267
Physical Chemistry	301
Chemistry	385

== International ==
The university has established exchange and cooperation with 66 institutions of higher learning and research institutions from over 40 countries and regions, including the United States of America, the United Kingdom, France, Russia, Canada, South Korea, Liberia and Hong Kong.
