= Shaoyang University =

Provincial public college in Shaoyang, Hunan, China

- 邵阳学院
- Motto: 明德求真，共生超越
- Type: Public college
- Established: 1958; 68 years ago
- President: Peng Xilin (彭希林)
- Academic staff: 3,888 (November 2019)
- Location: Shaoyang, Hunan, China; 27°12′13″N 111°26′11″E
- Campus: 280 acres (110 ha)
- Website: www.hnsyu.edu.cn

Shaoyang University (Chinese: 邵阳学院; pinyin: Shàoyáng Xuéyuàn; lit. 'Shaoyang College') is a provincial public college in Shaoyang, Hunan, China. The college is granted university status. The college is under the Hunan Provincial Department of Education.

== History ==
Shaoyang University was formed in 1958.

== Academics ==
- Department of Economic Administration
- Department of Politic and Low
- Department of Physical
- Department of Chinese Language and Literature
- Department of Foreign Languages
- Department of Music
- Department of Artistic Designing
- Department of Science and Information Science
- Department of Biological and Chemical Engineering
- Department of Architecture and Urban Planning
- Department of Machinery and Energy Engineering
- Department of Electric Engineering
- Department of Information Engineering
- Department of Accounting

== Library collections ==
Shaoyang University's total collection reaches to more than 1.51 million items.

== Culture ==
- Motto: 明德求真，共生超越

== People ==
=== Notable faculty ===
- Li Guojie, a member of the Chinese Academy of Engineering.
- Jiang Dawei, honorary professor.
- Justin Hill, English author, taught here from 1998-9 and 2005-6, when he received the 2005 Xiaoxiang Friendship Award from the Governor of Hunan. His prize-winning novel, The Drink and Dream Teahouse, was set in Shaoyang.
