= Best Chinese Universities Ranking =

Chinese university ranking

- Categories: Higher education
- Frequency: Annual
- Publisher: Shanghai Ranking Consultancy
- Founded: 2015; 10 years ago
- Country: People's Republic of China
- Language: English and Chinese
- Website: shanghairanking.com

Best Chinese Universities Ranking
- Simplified Chinese: 中国大学排名
- Traditional Chinese: 中國大學排名
Transcriptions
Standard Mandarin
- Hanyu Pinyin: Zhōngguó dàxué páimíng

The Best Chinese Universities Ranking (BCUR) is a domestic ranking table of Chinese institutions of higher education. It is compiled by Shanghai Ruanke, the same agency that is behind the Academic Ranking of World Universities (ARWU).

In the 2024 version, 594 institutions in mainland China were assessed by the exercise.

== Methodology ==
BCUR methodology
| Dimension | Criterion | Indicator | Weighting |
|---|---|---|---|
| Teaching and Learning | Quality of Incoming Students | Average score of incoming freshmen in national college entrance exam | 30% |
| Teaching and Learning | Education Outcome | Employment rate of bachelor degree recipients | 10% |
| Teaching and Learning | Reputation | Income from donations | 5% |
| Research | Scale of Research | Number of papers in Scopus | 10% |
| Research | Quality of Research | Field Weighted Citation Impact | 10% |
| Research | Top Research Achievements | World Top 1% Most Cited Paper | 10% |
| Research | Top Scholars | Chinese Most Cited Researchers | 10% |
| Social Service | Technology Service | Research Income from Industry | 5% |
| Social Service | Technology Transfer | Income from Technology Transfer | 5% |
| Internationalization | International Student Ratio | International Students as a Percentage of Total Students | 5% |
