= Types of universities and colleges in China =

In China, universities and colleges are classified in different ways for administrative purposes by the Ministry of Education of China.

== By designated academic emphasis ==
By designated academic emphasis, universities and colleges are classified into 12 categories by the Ministry of Education of China:

- Comprehensive (综合类)
- Science and Engineering (理工类)
- Normal (师范类)
- Agriculture and Forestry (农林类)
- Political Science and Law (政法类)
- Medicine and Pharmacy (医药类)
- Finance and Economics (财经类)
- Ethnology (民族类)
- Linguistics (语言类)
- Fine Arts (艺术类)
- Sports (体育类)
- Military Science (军事类)

== By institutional affiliation ==
By institutional affiliation, universities and colleges are classified into four categories:

- Affiliated to central government ministries (中央部属高校)
  - Public universities and colleges that are directly affiliated with cabinet ministries and commissions of the State Council.
- Provincial (省属) / Regional (自治区属) / Municipal (市属)
  - Public universities and colleges that are affiliated with the governments of provinces, cities, and autonomous regions.
- Private (民办/私立)
  - Universities and colleges that are owned and operated by private enterprises.
- Independent college (独立学院)
  - Independent colleges are owned by private companies, mostly for-profit. They are prefixed with the name of a public university under a contract between the public university and the private company, but in fact the colleges are independent. The independent colleges issue their own diplomas. Some independent colleges will completely break away from public universities and eventually become private universities or colleges.

== By institutional status ==
The Ministry of Education of China imposes strict naming regulations for the Chinese names of nationwide higher education institutions. Only institutions that satisfy all requirements set up by the ministry can use the stand-alone word "University" in their Chinese names. Otherwise, the institutions may only use other words such as "College," "Vocational and Technical University," or "Vocational and Technical College" instead. However, the Ministry of Education of China does not examine or regulate the English names of higher education institutions. Therefore, a number of colleges and vocational colleges in China adapt the stand-alone word "University" as part of their self-translated English names.

- University (大学)
  - The number of full-time students in the university should be more than 8,000.
  - The number of postgraduate students on campus shall not be less than 5% of the total number of full-time students.
  - In the humanities (philosophy, literature, history, etc.), social sciences (economics, law, education, etc.), science, engineering, agriculture, medicine, management and other disciplines, universities should have more than 3 disciplines as Main subjects.
  - The general undergraduate majors in each major subject category should cover more than three first-level disciplines in that subject category.
  - The number of full-time undergraduate and above students in each major subject category shall not be less than 15% of the total number of full-time undergraduate and above students in the school.
  - Have at least 2 master's degree-granting points.
  - The total number of general undergraduate majors offered by the school is at least 20.
  - The proportion of full-time faculty members with graduate degrees should generally reach more than 50%, and the proportion of full-time faculty members with doctoral degrees in the total number of full-time faculty members should generally reach more than 20%.
  - The number of full-time faculty members with senior professional and technical titles should generally be no less than 400, of which the number of full-time faculty members with full professor titles should generally be no less than 100.
- College (学院)
- Vocational University/Vocational and Technical University (职业大学/职业技术大学)
- Vocational College/Vocational and Technical College (职业学院/职业技术学院)
- Senior Vocational School (高等专科学校)
- Adult Higher Education School (成人高等学校)
  - Radio and TV University/Open University (广播电视大学/开放大学)
  - Workers' College (职工高等学校)
  - Peasants' College (农民高等学校)
  - Institutes for Administration (管理干部学院)
  - Educational College (教育学院)
  - Independent Correspondence College (独立函授学院)
