= Hunan Provincial People's Government =

Hunan Provincial People's Government 湖南省人民政府
- Established: August 1949; 77 years ago

Leadership
- Governor: Xie Weijiang; 30 October 2026
- Parent body: Central People's Government; Hunan Provincial People's Congress
- Elected by: Hunan Provincial People's Congress

Meeting place
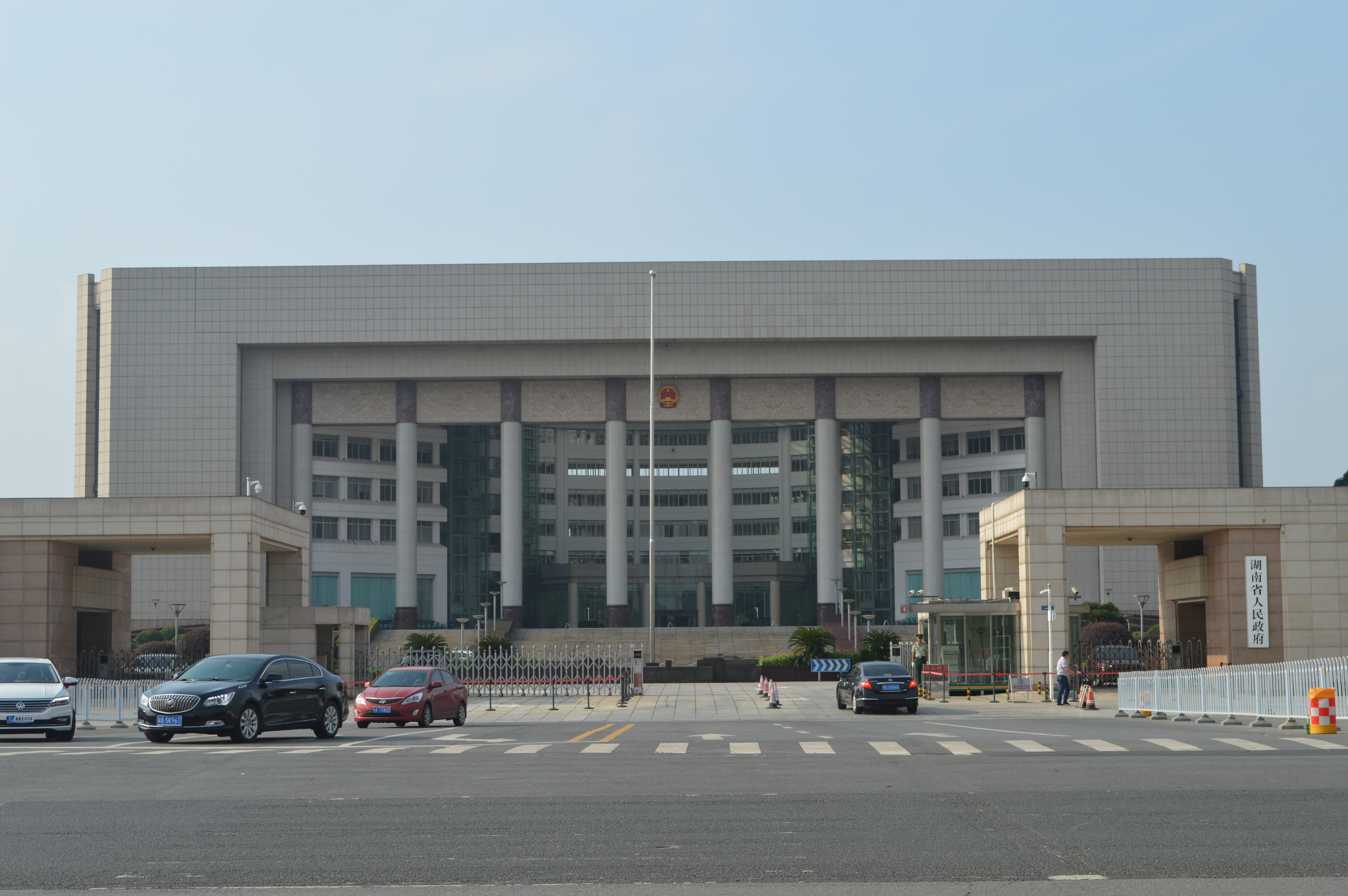
- Headquarters in Tianxin District of Changsha

Website
- www.hunan.gov.cn

The Hunan Provincial People's Government (Chinese: 湖南省人民政府; pinyin: Húnánshěng Rénmín Zhèngfǔ) is the local administrative agency of Hunan. It is officially elected by the Hunan Provincial People's Congress and is formally responsible to the Hunan Provincial People's Congress and its Standing Committee. Under the country's one-party system, the governor is subordinate to the secretary of the Hunan Provincial Committee of the Chinese Communist Party. The Provincial government is headed by a governor, currently Xie Weijiang.

== History ==
The Hunan Provincial People's Government was founded in August 1949, at that time it bore the name Hunan Provincial Temporary Government (湖南省临时政府) and would later become Hunan Provincial Military and Political Commission (湖南省军政委员会) in the same month.

In April 1950, the Hunan Provincial People's Government was officially established. Its name was changed to Hunan Provincial People's Committee (湖南省人民委员会) in February 1955 and subsequently Hunan Provincial Revolutionary Committee (湖南省革命委员会) in April 1968 during the Cultural Revolution. It reverted to its former name of Hunan Provincial People's Government in December 1979.

== Organization ==
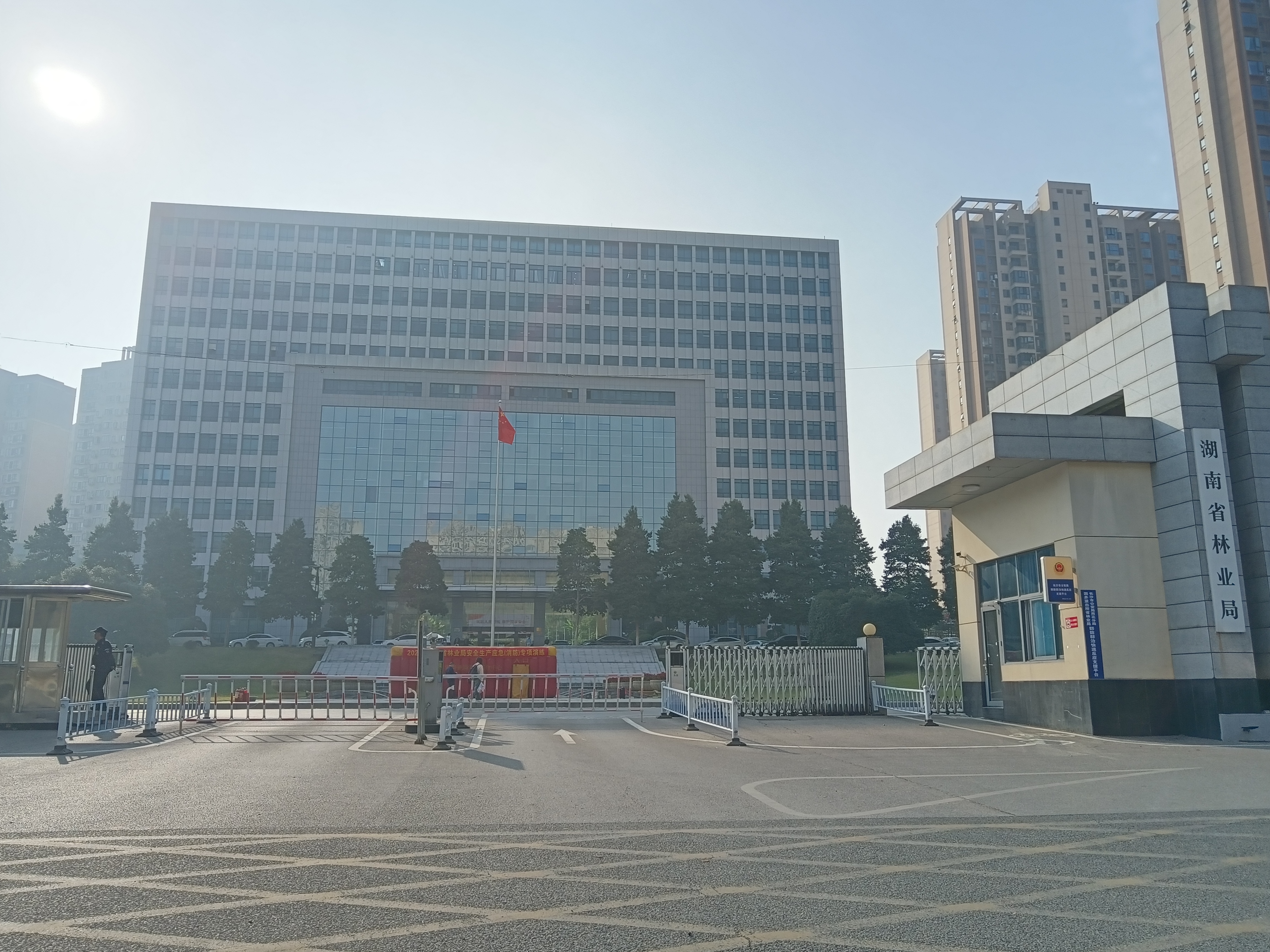
Hunan Provincial Forestry Department

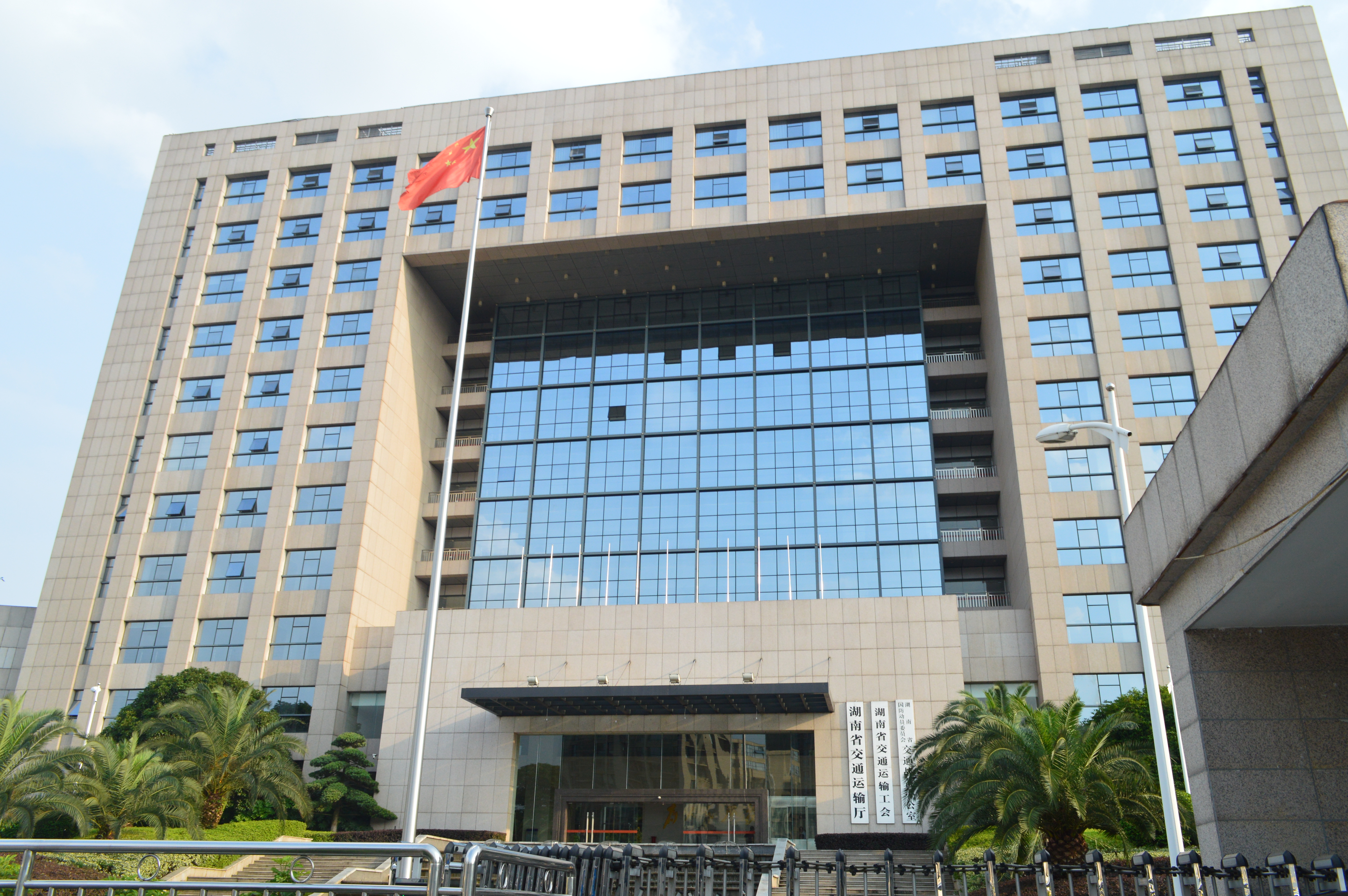
Hunan Provincial Transportation Department

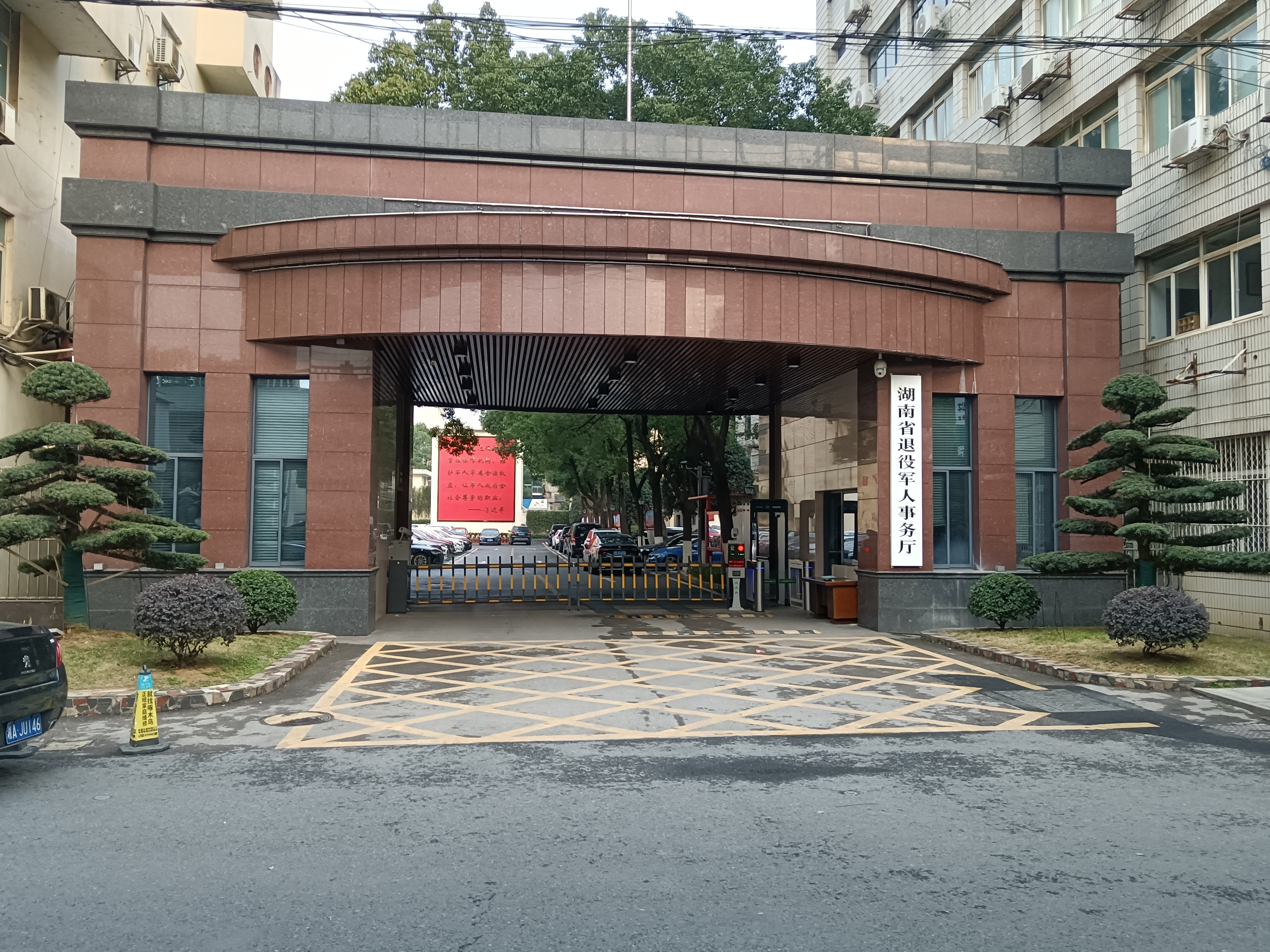
Hunan Provincial Veterans Affairs Department

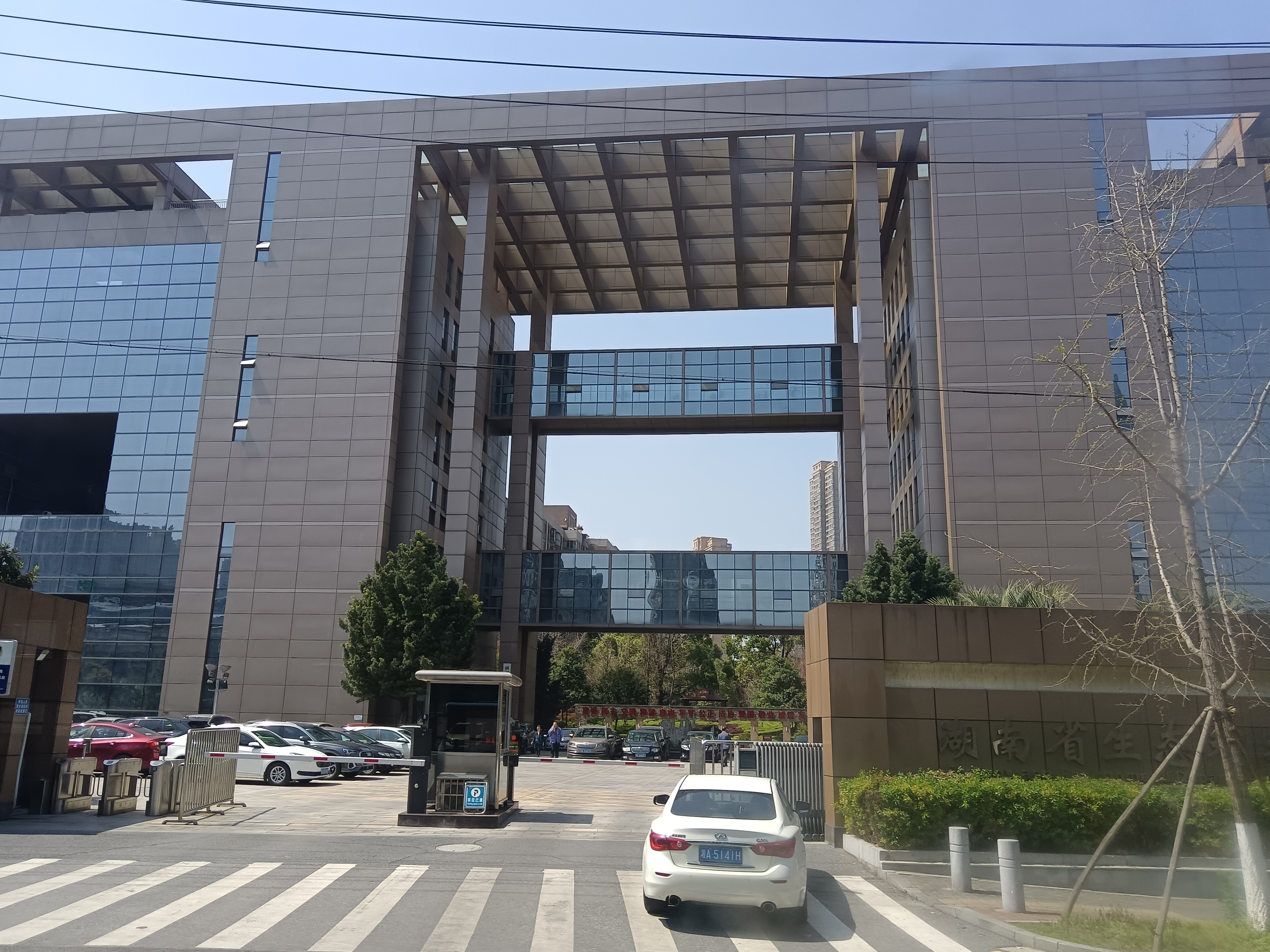
Hunan Provincial Ecology and Environment Department

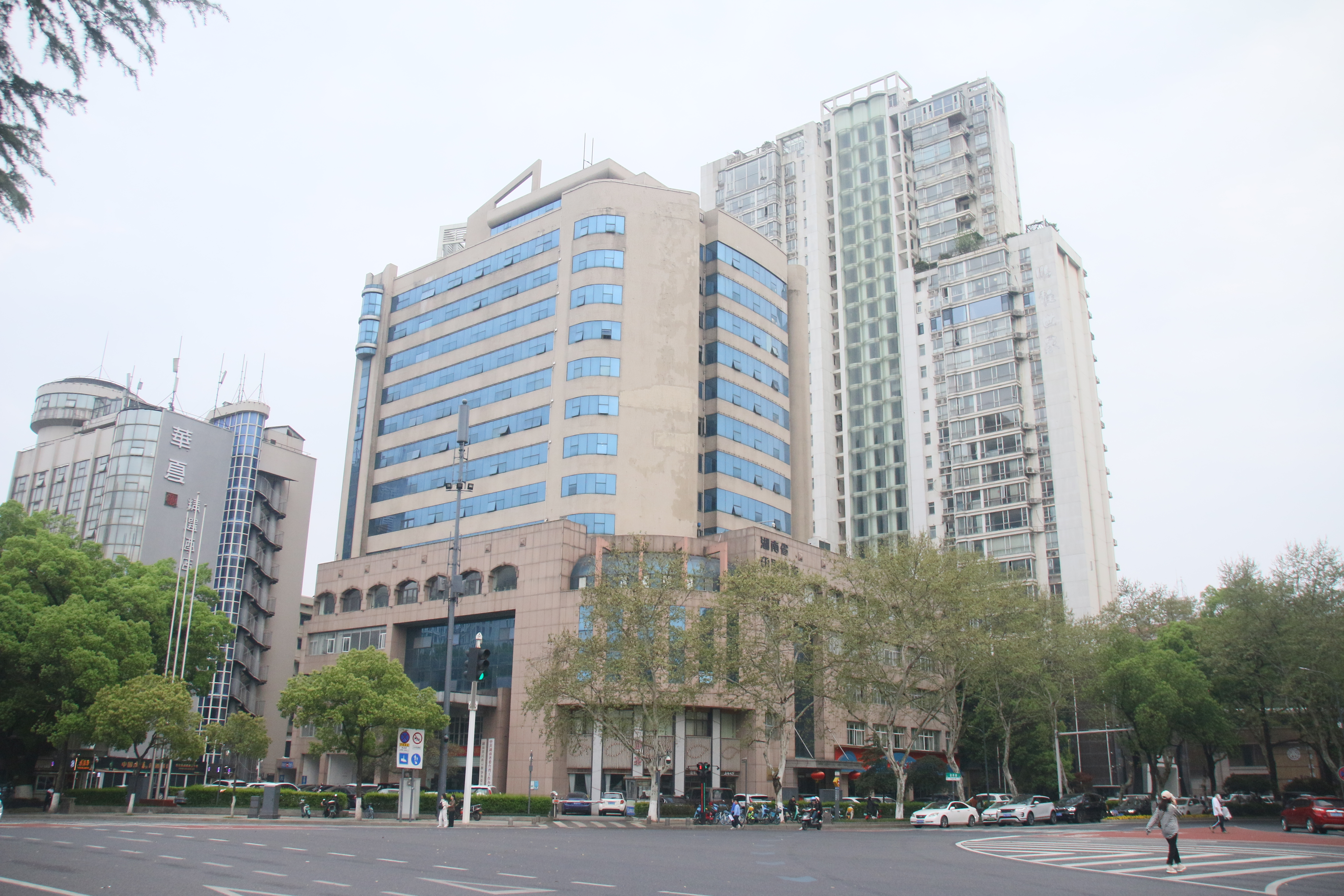
Hunan Provincial Ethnic and Religious Affairs Commission

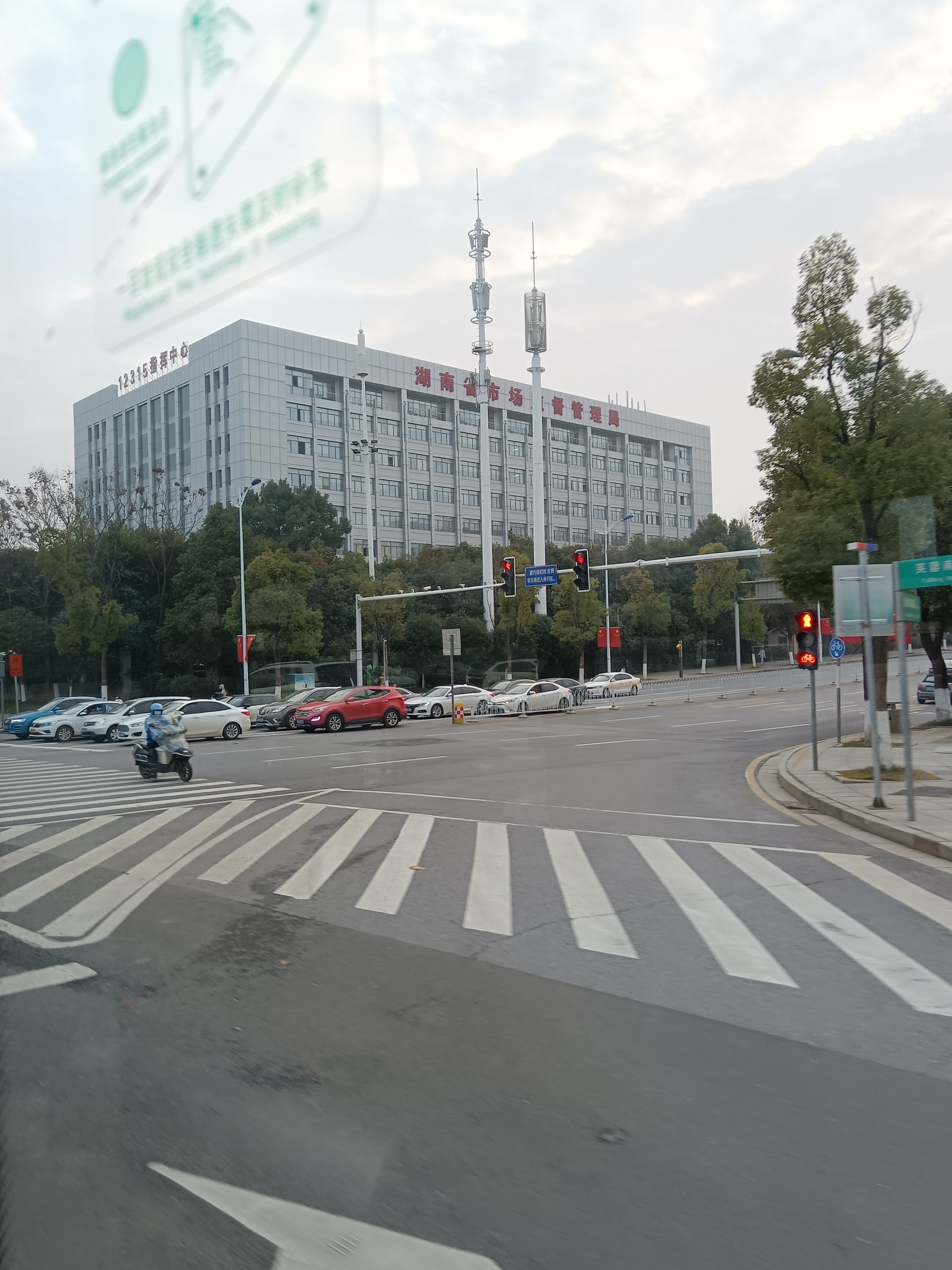
Hunan Provincial Administration for Market Regulation

The organization of the Hunan Provincial People's Government includes:

- General Office of the Hunan Provincial People's Government

=== Component Departments ===
- Hunan Provincial Development and Reform Commission
- Hunan Provincial Education Department
- Hunan Provincial Science and Technology Department
- Hunan Provincial Industry and Information Technology Department
- Hunan Provincial Ethnic and Religious Affairs Commission
- Hunan Provincial Public Security Department
- Hunan Provincial Civil Affairs Department
- Hunan Provincial Justice Department
- Hunan Provincial Finance Department
- Hunan Provincial Human Resources and Social Security Department
- Hunan Provincial Natural Resources Department
- Hunan Provincial Ecology and Environment Department
- Hunan Provincial Housing and Urban Rural Development Department
- Hunan Provincial Transportation Department
- Hunan Provincial Water Resources Department
- Hunan Provincial Agriculture and Rural Affairs Department
- Hunan Provincial Commerce Department
- Hunan Provincial Culture and Tourism Department
- Hunan Provincial Health Commission
- Hunan Provincial Veterans Affairs Department
- Hunan Provincial Emergency Management Department
- Hunan Provincial Audit Office

=== Directly affiliated special institution ===
- State-owned Assets Supervision and Administration Commission of Hunan Provincial People's Government

=== Organizations under the government ===
- Hunan Provincial Forestry Department
- Hunan Provincial Administration for Market Regulation
- Hunan Provincial Radio and Television Bureau
- Hunan Provincial Sports Bureau
- Hunan Provincial Bureau of Statistics
- Hunan Provincial Office Affairs Management Bureau
- Research Office of Hunan Provincial People's Government
- Hunan Provincial Local Financial Supervision and Administration Bureau
- Hunan Provincial Defense Mobilization Office
- Hunan Provincial Bureau of Letters and Visits
- Hunan Provincial Rural Revitalization Bureau
- Hunan Provincial Grain and Material Reserve Bureau (Deputy-department level)
- Hunan Provincial Medical Security Bureau (Deputy-department level)

=== Public institutions ===
- Hunan Provincial Culture and History Institute
- Hunan Provincial Supply and Marketing Cooperative Federation
- Development Research Center of Hunan Provincial People's Government
- Hunan Provincial Local Chronicles Compilation Institute
- Hunan Provincial Geological Institute
- Hunan Provincial Nonferrous Metals Administration
- Hunan Provincial Reservoir Resettlement Development Management Bureau
- Hunan Changsha-Zhuzhou-Xiangtan Integrated Development Affairs Center
- Hunan Provincial Traditional Chinese Medicine Institute

=== Departmental management organization ===
- Hunan Provincial Government Administration Service Bureau, managed by the General Office of the Hunan Provincial People's Government.
- Hunan Provincial Energy Bureau, managed by the Hunan Provincial Development and Reform Commission.
- Hunan Provincial Prison Administration, managed by the Hunan Provincial Justice Department.
- Hunan Provincial Cultural Relics Bureau, managed by the Hunan Provincial Culture and Tourism Department.
- Hunan Provincial Traditional Chinese Medicine Administration, managed by the Hunan Provincial Health Commission.
- Hunan Provincial Drug Administration, managed by the Hunan Provincial Market Supervision Bureau.

=== Agency ===
- Hunan Xiangjiang New Area Management Committee
- Beijing Office of the Hunan Provincial People's Government
- Shanghai Office of the Hunan Provincial People's Government
- Guangzhou Office of the Hunan Provincial People's Government
- Shenzhen Office of the Hunan Provincial People's Government
- Hainan Free Trade Port of the Hunan Provincial People's Government

== Gallery ==
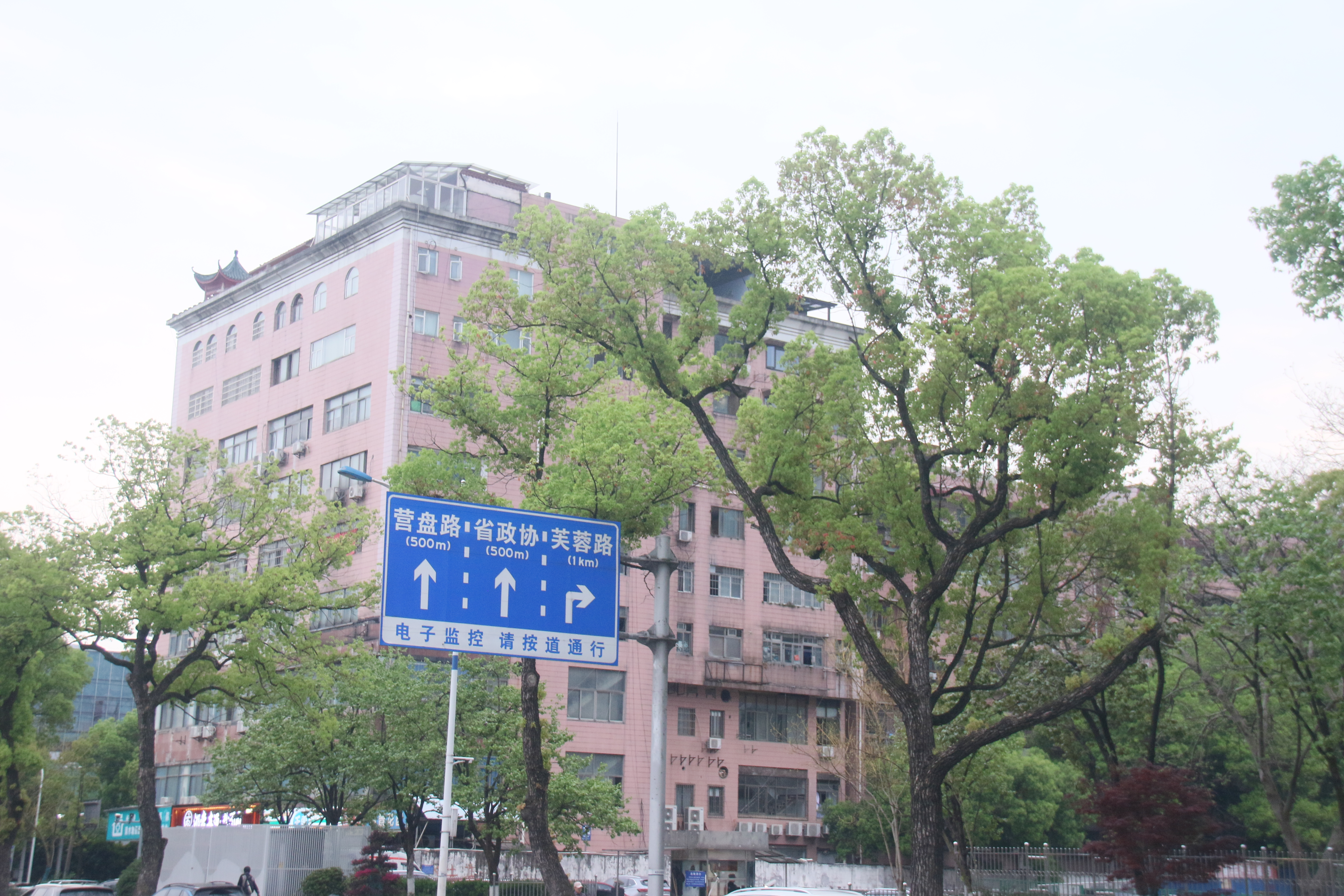
Hunan Provincial Sports Bureau

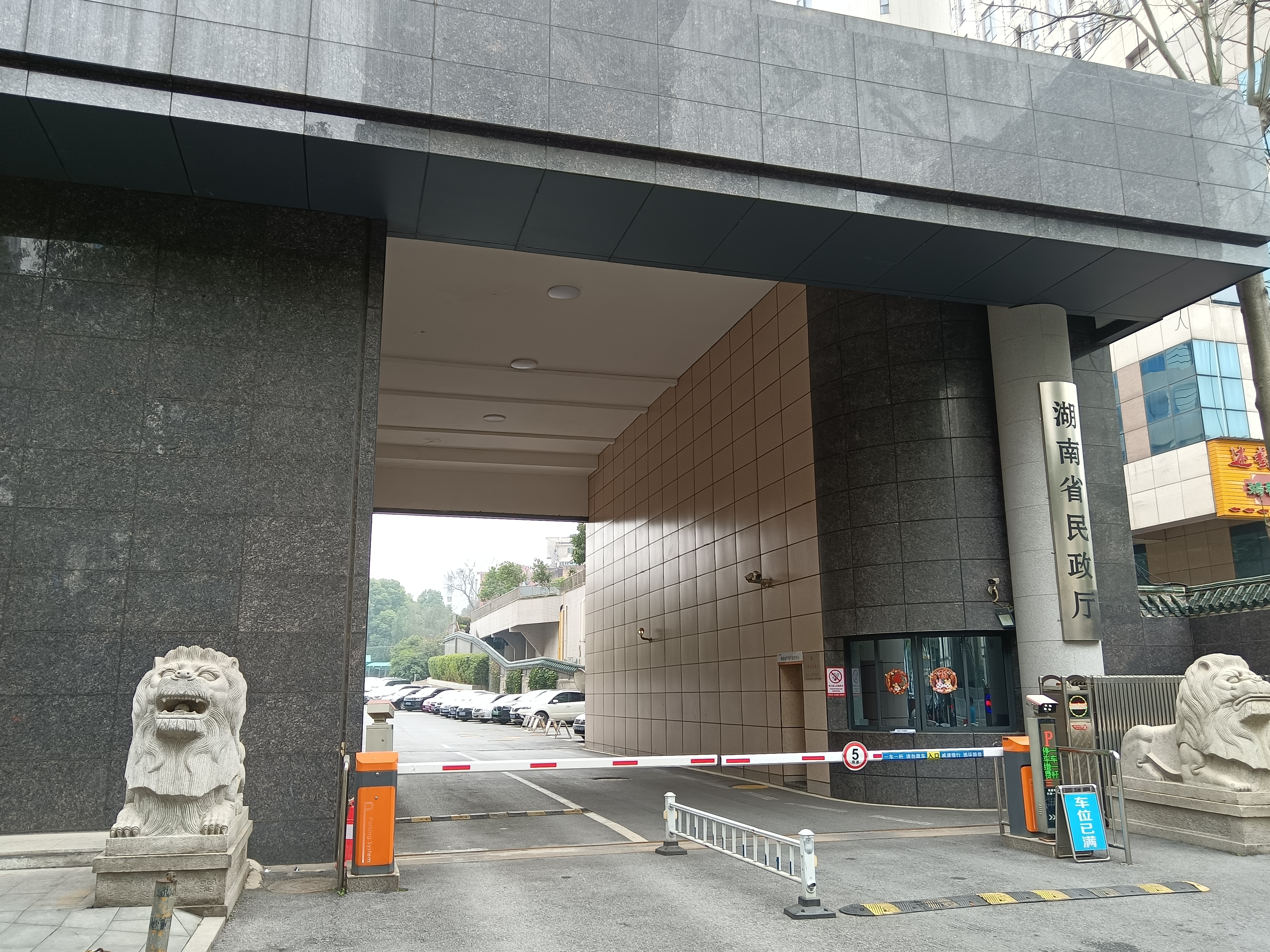
Hunan Provincial Civil Affairs Department

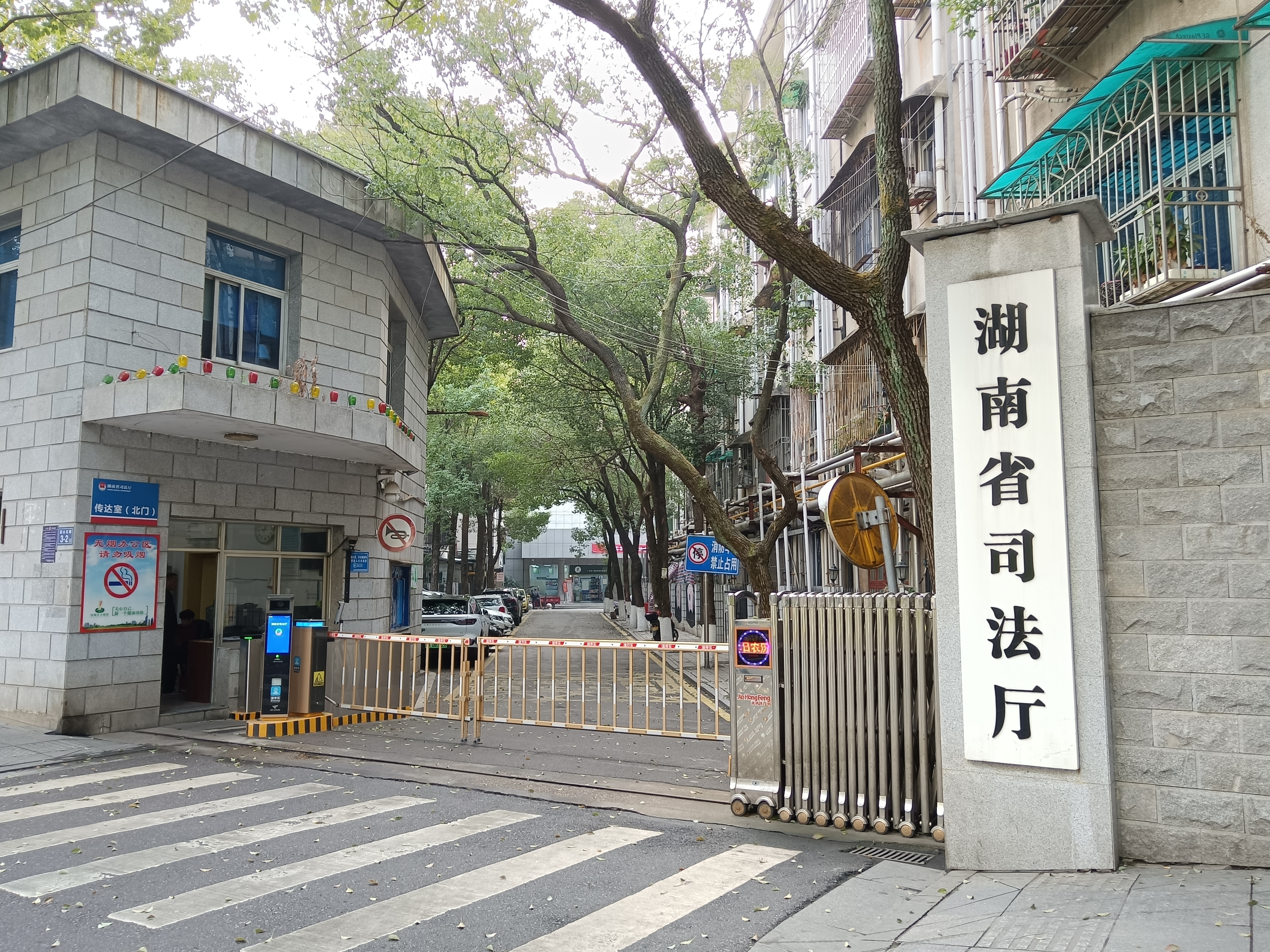
Hunan Provincial Justice Department
