= Governor of Hunan =

Governor of the Hunan Provincial People's Government
- 湖南省人民政府省长
- National Emblem of China

- Flag of China
- Incumbent; Xie Weijiang; Acting since 30 October 2026
- Hunan Provincial People's Government
- Type: Governor
- Status: Provincial and ministerial-level official
- Reports to: Hunan Provincial People's Congress and its Standing Committee
- Nominator: Presidium of the Hunan Provincial People's Congress
- Appointer: Hunan Provincial People's Congress
- Inaugural holder: Chen Mingren
- Formation: 4 August 1949
- Deputy: Deputy Governors; Secretary-General

The governor of Hunan, officially the Governor of the Hunan Provincial People's Government, is the head Hunan Province and leader of the Hunan Provincial People's Government.

The governor is elected by the Hunan Provincial People's Congress, and responsible to it and its Standing Committee. The governor is a provincial level official and is responsible for the overall decision-making of the provincial government. The governor is assisted by an executive vice governor as well as several vice governors. The governor generally serves as the deputy secretary of the Hunan Provincial Committee of the Chinese Communist Party and as a member of the CCP Central Committee. The governor is the second highest-ranking official in the province after the secretary of the CCP Hunan Committee. The current governor is Xie Weijiang, who took office on 30 October 2026.

== List of governors ==
=== People's Republic of China ===
Image	Name (English)	Name (Chinese)	Took office	Left office	Ref.
	Chen Mingren	陈明仁	4 August 1949	24 August 1949	
	Cheng Qian	程潜	August 1949	April 1950	
	Wang Shoudao	王首道	April 1950	December 1952	
	Cheng Qian	程潜	December 1952	April 1968	
	Li Yuan	黎原	April 1968	May 1970	
	Hua Guofeng	华国锋	May 1970	June 1977	
	Mao Zhiyong	毛致用	June 1977	December 1979	
	Sun Guozhi	孙国治	December 1979	May 1983	
	Liu Zheng	刘正	May 1983	July 1985	
	Xiong Qingquan	熊清泉	July 1985	May 1989	
	Chen Bangzhu	陈邦柱	May 1989	January 1995	
	Yang Zhengwu	杨正午	January 1995	September 1998	
	Chu Bo	储波	September 1998	16 August 2001	
	Zhang Yunchuan	张云川	16 August 2001	30 March 2003	
	Zhou Bohua	周伯华	31 March 2003	29 September 2006	
	Zhou Qiang	周强	30 September 2006	5 June 2010	
	Xu Shousheng	徐守盛	5 June 2010	10 April 2013	
	Du Jiahao	杜家毫	11 April 2013	5 September 2016	
	Xu Dazhe	许达哲	5 September 2016	27 November 2020	
	Mao Weiming	毛伟明	27 November 2020	30 October 2026	
	Xie Weijiang	谢卫江	30 October 2026	Incumbent	
