= Hunan =

Province in Central China

Hunan 湖南
- Province
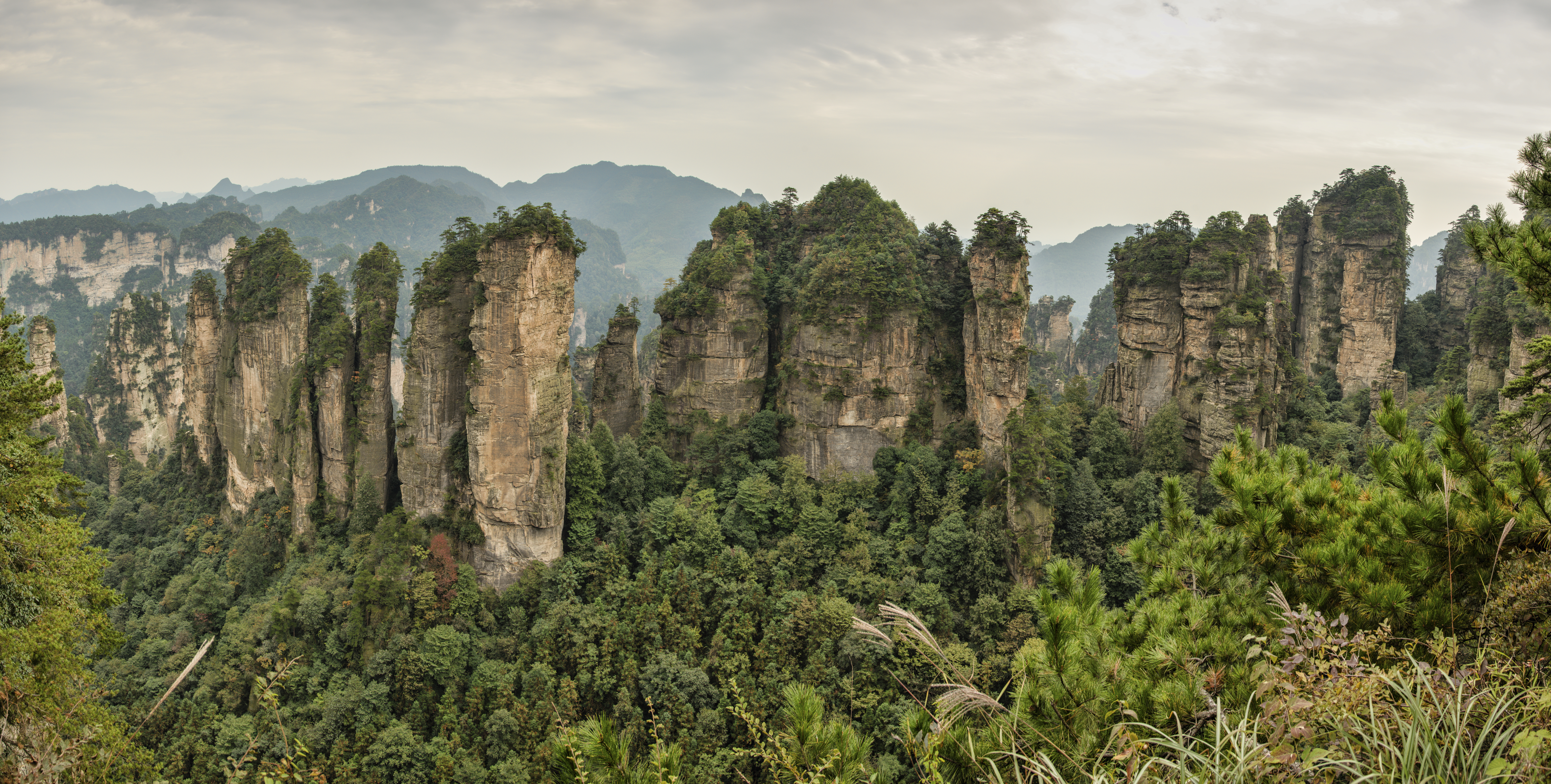
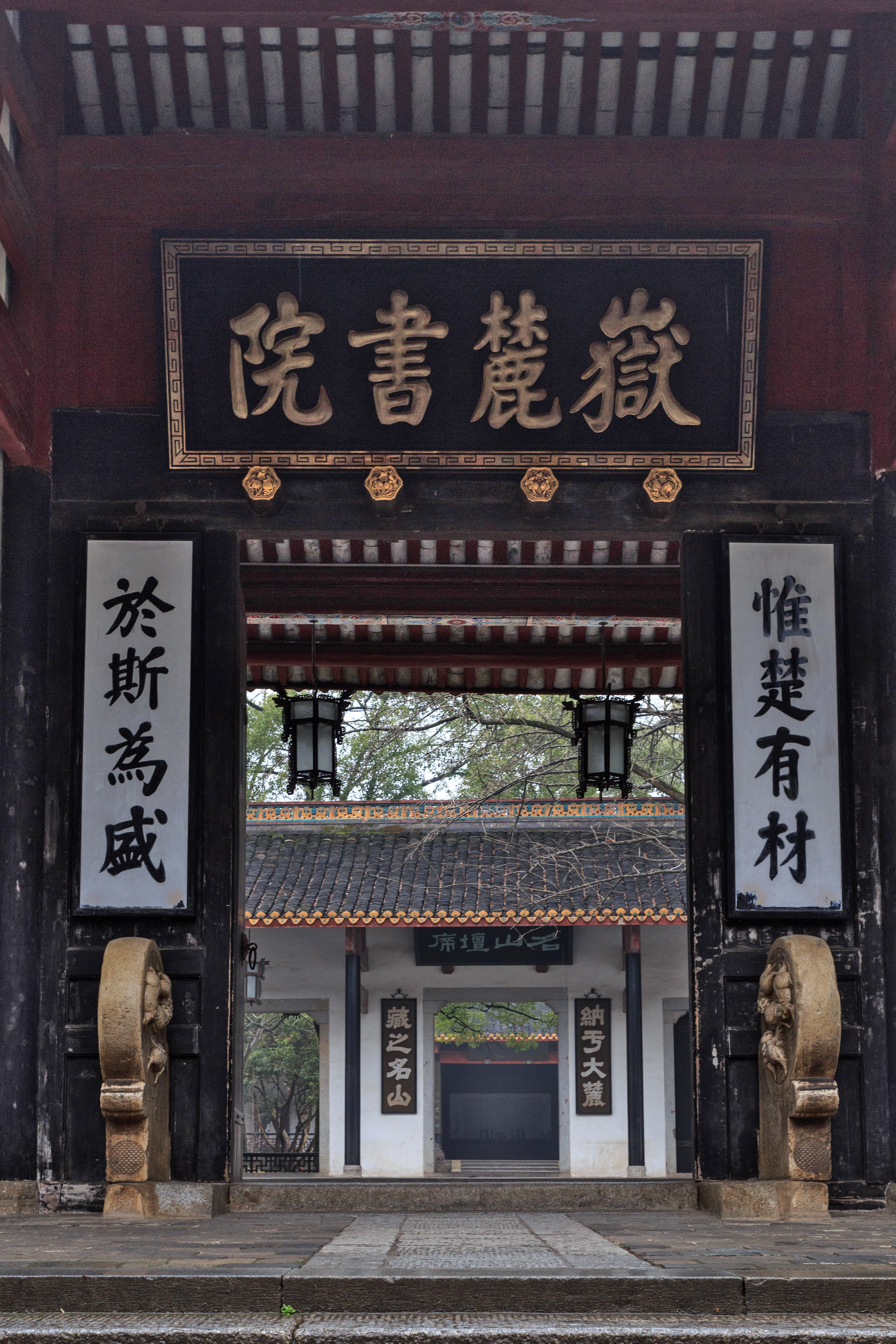
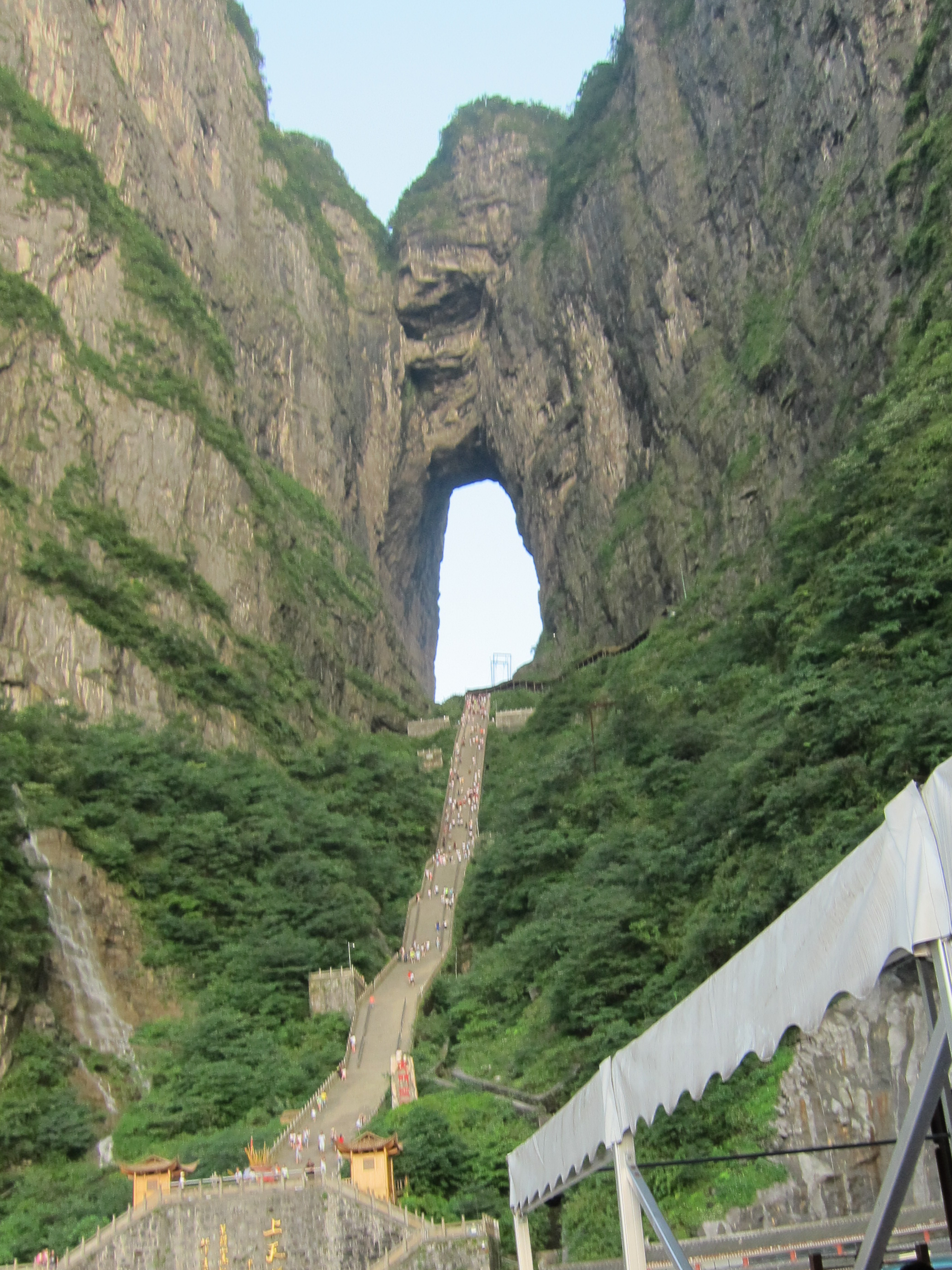
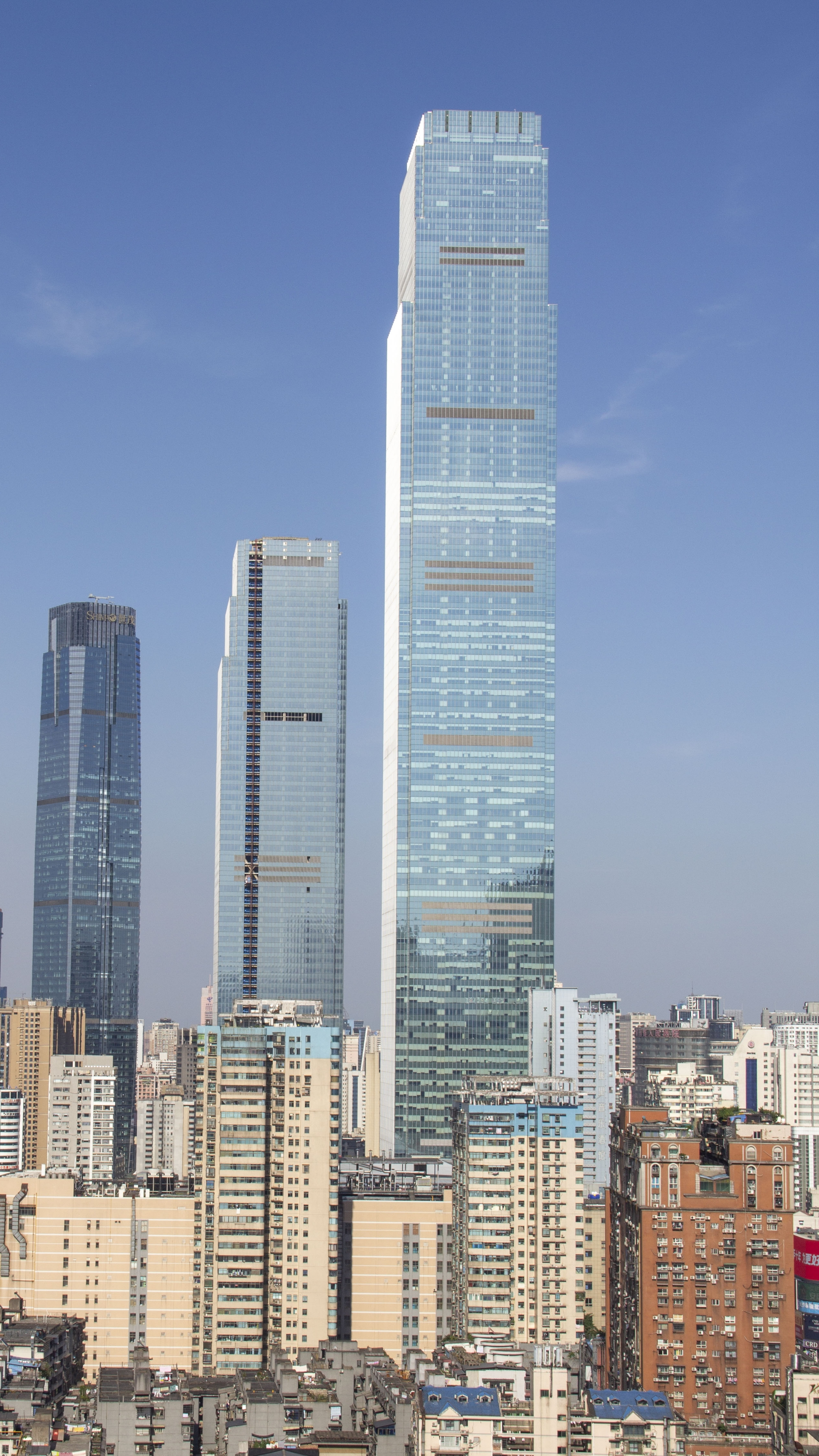
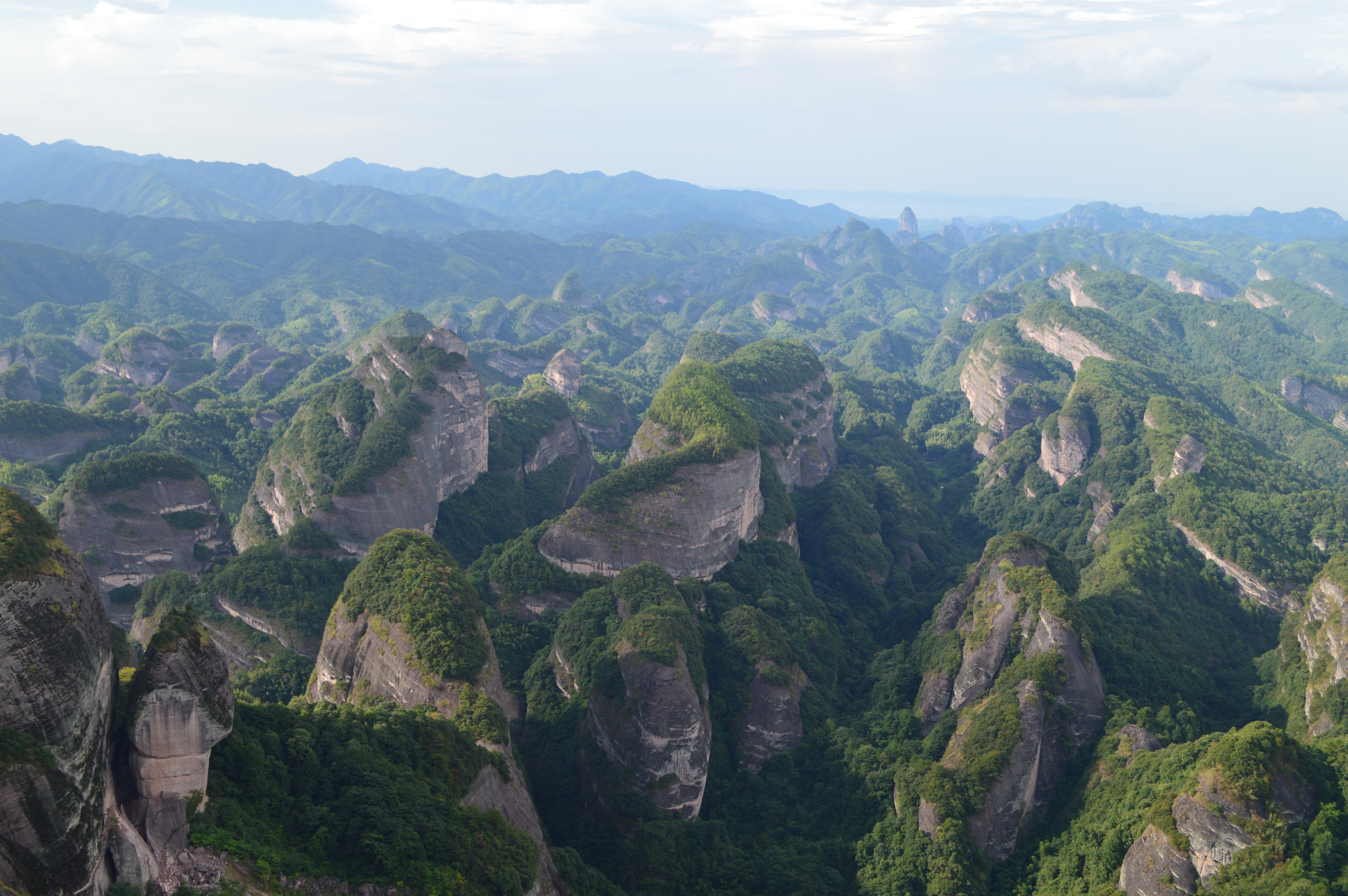
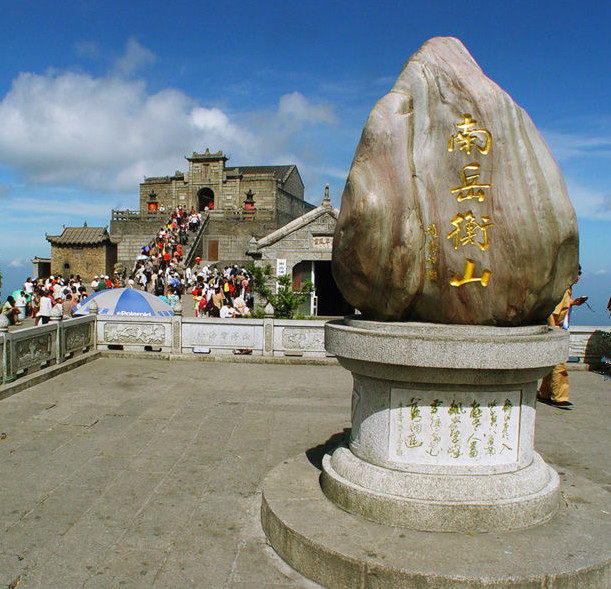
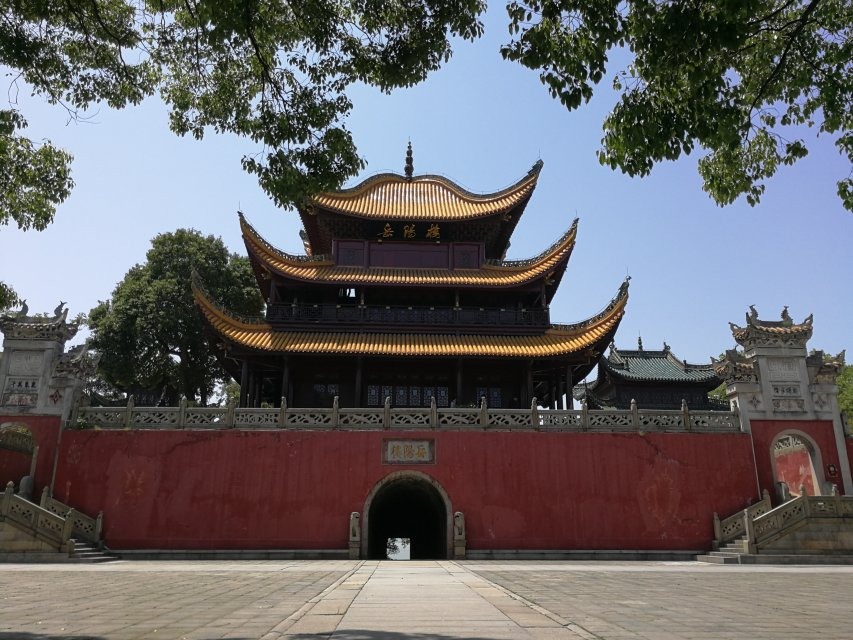
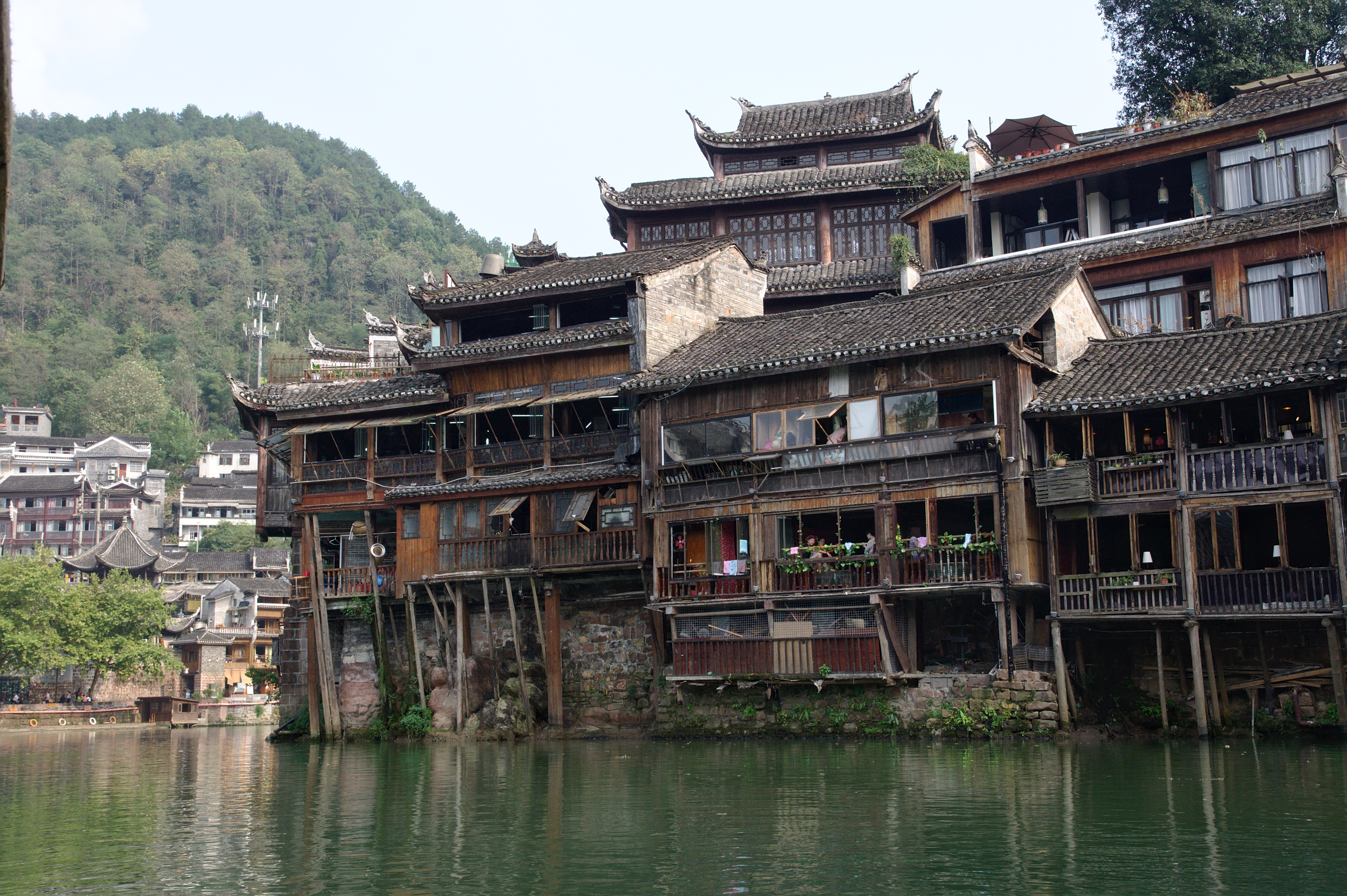
- Wulingyuan Yuelu Academy Tianmen Mountain IFS Tower Mount Langshan Mount Heng Yueyang Tower Fenghuang Town

- Location of Hunan in China
- Interactive map of Hunan
- Country: China
- Capital (and largest city): Changsha
- Divisions: 14 prefectures, 122 counties, 1,933 townships (2018), 29,224 villages (2018)

Government
  - Type: Province
  - Body: Hunan Provincial People's Congress
  - Party Secretary: Wang Zhijun
  - Congress chairman: Wang Zhijun
  - Governor: Xie Weijiang (acting)
  - Provincial CPPCC Chairman: Mao Wanchun
  - National People's Congress Representation: 118 deputies

Area
  - Total: 210,000 km^{2} (81,000 sq mi)
  - Rank: 10th
- Highest elevation (Mount Lingfeng): 2,115.2 m (6,940 ft)

Population (2020)
  - Total: 66,444,864
  - Rank: 7th
  - Density: 320/km^{2} (820/sq mi)
  - Rank: 13th
- Demonym: Hunanese

Demographics
  - Ethnic composition: Han – 90%; Tujia – 4%; Miao – 3%; Dong – 1%; Yao – 1%; Other peoples – 1%
  - Languages and dialects: Xiang; Gan; Southwestern Mandarin; Xiangnan Tuhua; Waxiang; Hakka; Yue; Xong; Tujia; Mien; Gam

GDP (2025)
  - Total: CN¥5,530 billion (10th; US$790 billion)
  - Per capita: CN¥84,583 (14th; US$11,900)
- ISO 3166 code: CN-HN
- HDI (2023): 0.790 (15th) – high
- Website: hunan.gov.cn; enghunan.gov.cn

Hunan
- "Hunan" in Chinese characters
- Chinese: 湖南
- Xiang: [fu˩˧ lan˩˧]
- Literal meaning: "South of the (Dongting) Lake"
Transcriptions
Standard Mandarin
- Hanyu Pinyin: Húnán
- Bopomofo: ㄏㄨˊ ㄋㄢˊ
- Wade–Giles: Hu^{2}-nan^{2}
- IPA: [xǔ.nǎn]
Wu
- Romanization: Wu^{去} noe^{平}
Xiang
- IPA: [fu˩˧ lan˩˧]
Yue: Cantonese
- Yale Romanization: Wùh-nàahm
- Jyutping: Wu4-naam4
- IPA: [wu˩nam˩]
Southern Min
- Tâi-lô: Ôo-lâm

Hunan (Note: Chinese: 湖南; pinyin: Húnán, Mandarin: [xu˧˥ nan˧˥], Xiang Chinese: [fu˩˧ lan˩˧].) is an inland province in Central China. Located in the middle reaches of the Yangtze watershed, it borders the province-level divisions of Hubei to the north, Jiangxi to the east, Guangdong and Guangxi to the south, and Guizhou and Chongqing to the northwest. Its capital and largest city is Changsha, which abuts the Xiang River. Hengyang, Zhuzhou, and Yueyang are among its most populous urban cities.

With a population of just over 66 million as of 2020 residing in an area of approximately 210,000 km^{2} (81,000 sq mi), it is China's 7th-most populous province, the third-most populous among landlocked provinces (after Henan and Sichuan), the third-most populous in South Central China (after Guangdong and Henan), and the second-most populous province in Central China. It is the largest province in South Central China and the fourth-largest landlocked province.

Hunan's nominal GDP was US$790 billion (CN¥5.53 trillion) as of 2025, appearing in the world's top 20 largest sub-national economies, with its GDP (PPP) being over US$1.62 trillion. Hunan is the 10th-largest provincial economy in China, the fourth-largest in South Central China, the third-largest in Central China, and the fourth-largest among landlocked provinces. Its nominal GDP per capita exceeded US$11,900, making it the third-richest province in South Central China, after Guangdong and Hubei. As of 2020, Hunan's nominal GDP reached $605 billion (CN¥4.18 trillion), exceeding that of Poland, with a GDP of US$596 billion, and Thailand, with a GDP of US$501 billion, the 22nd- and 25th-largest in the world, respectively.

The name Hunan literally means "south of the lake". The lake in question is Dongting Lake, in the northeast of the province. Vehicle license plates from Hunan are marked Xiāng (Chinese: 湘), after the Xiang River, which runs from south to north through Hunan and forms part of the province's largest drainage system. The area of Hunan was under Chinese rule as far back as 350 BC. Hunan was the birthplace of communist revolutionary Mao Zedong, who became the Chairman of the Chinese Communist Party and the founding father of the People's Republic of China. Hunan today is home to some ethnic minorities, including the Tujia and Miao, along with the Han Chinese, who make up a majority of the population. Varieties of Chinese spoken include Xiang, Gan, and Southwestern Mandarin.

Wulingyuan was inscribed as a UNESCO World Heritage Site in 1992. Changsha, the capital, is in the eastern part of the province and is an important commercial, manufacturing, and transportation center. The busiest airports serve domestic and international flights for Hunan, including Changsha Huanghua International Airport, Zhangjiajie Hehua International Airport, and Changde Taohuayuan Airport.

Hunan is the seat of the Yuelu Academy (later Hunan University), one of the four major academies over the last 1,000 years in ancient China. As of 2023, Hunan hosted 137 institutions of higher education, ranking fifth among all province-level divisions of China, and it houses five Double First-Class Universities of Hunan, Defense Technology, Central South, Hunan Normal and Xiangtan. As of 2024, two major cities in Hunan (Changsha 23rd and Xiangtan 199th) ranked in the world's top 200 cities by scientific research outputs.

== History ==
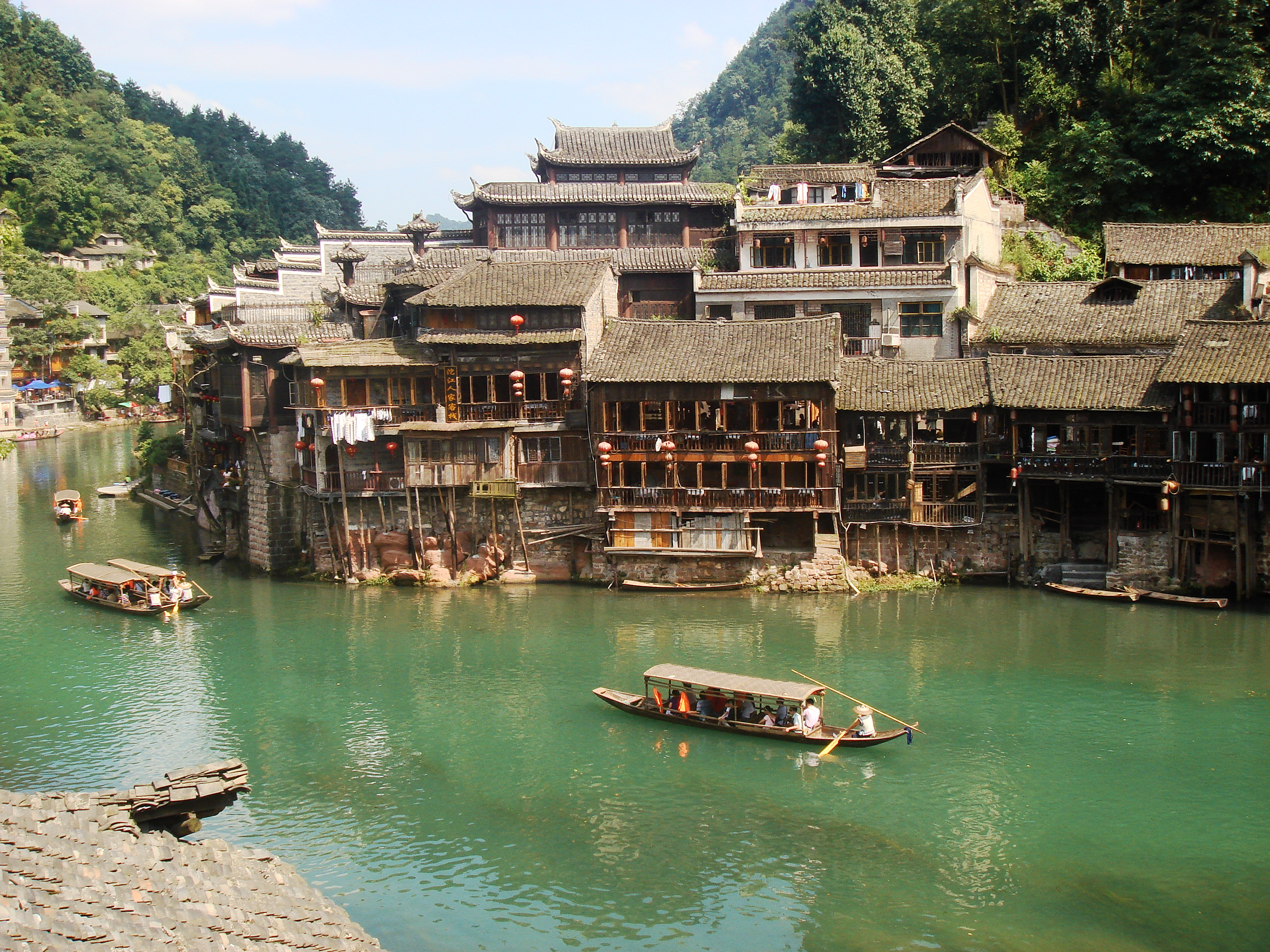
Fenghuang, a traditional town of Hunan

Hunan's primeval forests were first occupied by the ancestors of the modern Miao, Tujia, Dong and Yao peoples. The province entered written Chinese history around 350 BC, when it became part of the Zhou dynasty. After Qin conquered the Chu in 278 BC, the region came under the control of Qin, and then the Changsha Kingdom during the Han dynasty. At this time, and for hundreds of years thereafter, the province was a magnet for settlement of Han Chinese from the north, who displaced and assimilated the original indigenous inhabitants, cleared forests and began farming rice in the valleys and plains. The agricultural colonization of the lowlands was carried out in part by the Han people, who managed river dikes to protect farmland from floods. To this day, many of Hunan's small villages are named after Han families who settled there. Migration from the north was especially prevalent during the Eastern Jin dynasty, Sixteen Kingdoms and the Northern and Southern dynasties periods, when the north was mostly ruled by non-Han ethnic groups (Five Barbarians) and in perpetual disorder.

During the Five Dynasties and Ten Kingdoms period, Hunan was home to its own independent regime, Ma Chu. Han migration from the North continued under subsequent dynasties, with migrants fleeing from the invasions of the Yuan dynasty (Mongols). The Red Turban Rebellions against the Yuan dynasty first rose up in Hunan in the 14th century.

Hunan and Hubei became a part of the province of Huguang until the Qing dynasty. Hunan province was created in 1664 from Huguang and renamed in 1723. Hunan was regarded by early travelers as the "most conservative and virulently hostile to outsiders" yet was struck by the "keenness and stubborn deposition of the people". Prince Gong, the Qing Prince Regent called the people of Hunan "turbulent and pugnacious". During Griffith John's arrival at Hunan, he was stoned by a mob and as early as the 18th century, the Jesuits in China regarded Hunan as the "most impenetrable part" of China, a place "where persecution is most to be feared".

Hunan became an important communications center due to its position on the Yangzi River. It was an important centre of scholarly activity and Confucian thought, particularly in the Yuelu Academy in Changsha. It was also on the Imperial Highway between northern and southern China. The land produced grain so abundantly that it fed many parts of China with its surpluses. The population continued to climb until, by the 19th century, Hunan became overcrowded and prone to peasant uprisings. Some of the uprisings, such as the ten-year Miao Rebellion of 1795–1806, were caused by ethnic tensions. The Taiping Rebellion began in Guangxi Province in 1850, then spread into Hunan and further eastward along the Yangzi River valley. A Hunanese army (Xiang Army) under Zeng Guofan marched into Nanjing to put down the uprising in 1864.

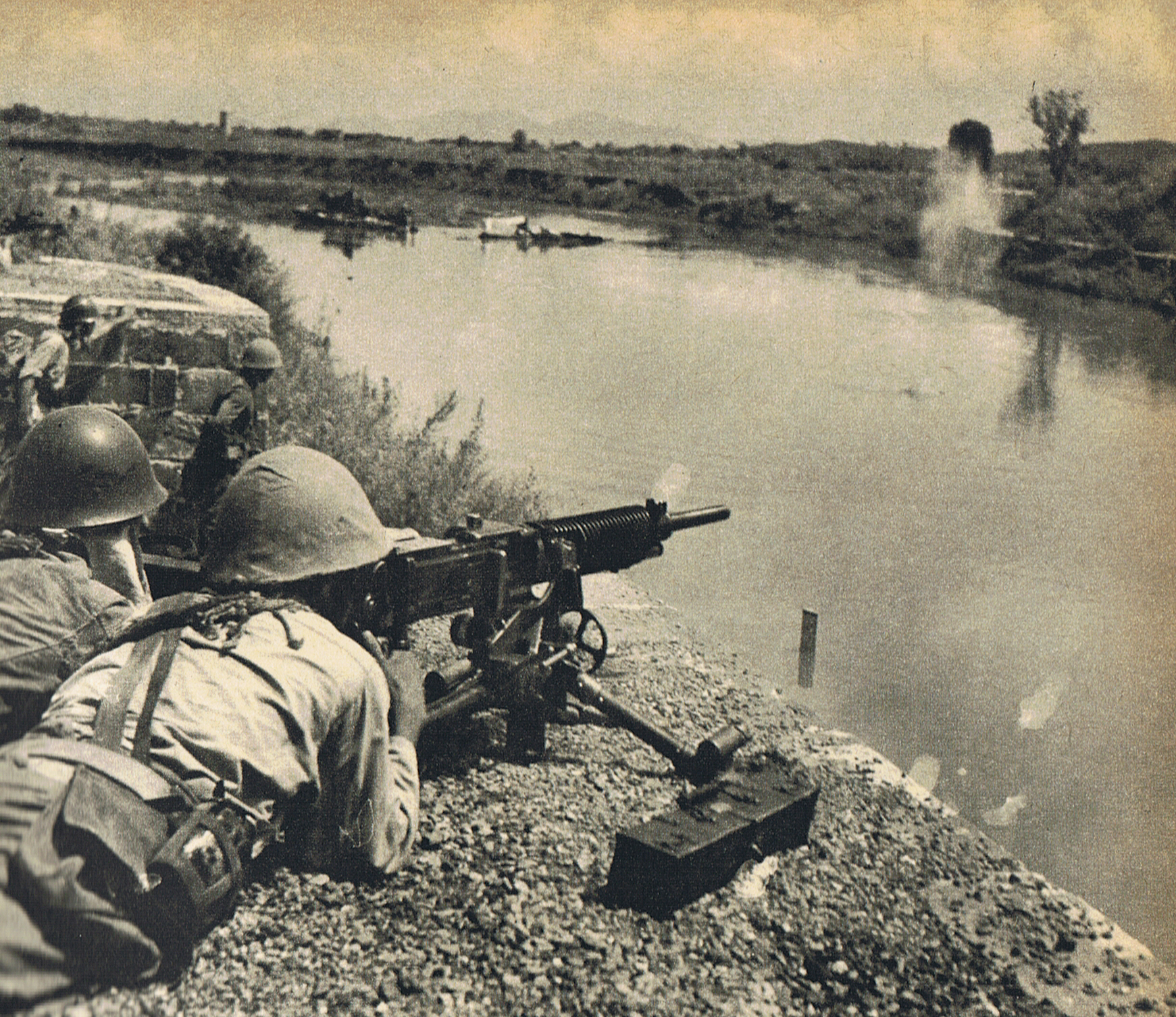
Invading Japanese soldiers firing across the Miluo River during the Battle of Changsha in World War II

In 1927, the Autumn Harvest Uprising, led by Hunanese native Mao Zedong, established a short-lived Hunan Soviet in 1927. The Communists maintained a guerrilla army in the mountains along the Hunan-Jiangxi border until 1934. Under pressure from the Nationalist Kuomintang (KMT) forces, they began the Long March to bases in Shaanxi Province. After the Communists departed, the KMT fought the Japanese in the Second Sino-Japanese War. It defended Changsha until it fell in 1944. Japan launched Operation Ichi-Go, a plan to control the railroad from Wuchang to Guangzhou (Yuehan Railway). Hunan was relatively unscathed by the civil war that followed the Japanese defeat in 1945. In 1949, the Communists returned as the Nationalists retreated southward.

As Mao's home province, Hunan supported the Cultural Revolution of 1966–1976, but it was slower than most provinces to adopt the reforms Deng Xiaoping implemented in the years after Mao's death in 1976.

In addition to Mao, several other first-generation communist leaders were from Hunan: Chinese President Liu Shaoqi; CCP Secretaries-General Ren Bishi and Hu Yaobang; Marshals Peng Dehuai, He Long, and Luo Ronghuan; Wang Zhen, one of the Eight Elders; Xiang Jingyu, the first female member of the CCP's central committee; Senior General Huang Kecheng; and veteran diplomat Lin Boqu. A more recent leader from Hunan is former Chinese Premier Zhu Rongji.

== Geography ==
Hunan is on the south bank of the Yangtze River, about halfway along its length, situated between 108° 47'–114° 16' east longitude and 24° 37'–30° 08' north latitude. Hunan covers an area of 211,800 square kilometres (81,800 square miles), making it the 10th largest provincial-level division. The east, south, and west sides of the province are surrounded by mountains and hills, such as the Wuling Mountains to the northwest, the Xuefeng Mountains to the west, the Nanling Mountains to the south, and the Luoxiao Mountains to the east. Mountains and hills occupy more than 80% of the province, and plains less than 20%. At 2,115.2 meters above sea level, Hunan's highest point is Lingfeng (酃峰).

The Xiang, the Zi, the Yuan, and the Lishui Rivers converge on the Yangtze River at Lake Dongting in the north of Hunan. The center and northern parts are somewhat low and a U-shaped basin, open in the north and with Lake Dongting as its center. Most of Hunan lies in the basins of four major tributaries of the Yangtze River.

Lake Dongting is the largest lake in the province and the second largest freshwater lake of China.

The Xiaoxiang area and Lake Dongting figure prominently in Chinese poetry and paintings, particularly during the Song dynasty when they were associated with officials who had been unjustly dismissed.

Changsha (which means "long sands") was an active ceramics district during the Tang dynasty, its tea bowls, ewers and other products mass-produced and shipped to China's coastal cities for export abroad. An Arab dhow dated to the 830s and today known as the Belitung Shipwreck was discovered off the small island of Belitung, Indonesia with more than 60,000 pieces in its cargo. The salvaged cargo is today housed in Singapore.

Hunan's climate is subtropical; under the Köppen climate classification, it is classified as humid subtropical (Köppen Cfa), with short, cool, damp winters, very hot and humid summers, and plenty of rain. January temperatures average 3 to 8 °C (37 to 46 °F), while July temperatures average around 27 to 30 °C (81 to 86 °F). Average annual precipitation is 1,200 to 1,700 millimetres (47 to 67 in). The Furongian Epoch in the Cambrian Period of geological time is named for Hunan; Furong (芙蓉) means "lotus" in Mandarin and refers to Hunan, which is known as the "lotus state".

== Administrative divisions ==
Hunan is divided into fourteen prefecture-level divisions: thirteen prefecture-level cities and an autonomous prefecture:

Administrative divisions of Hunan
Division code	Division	Area in km^{2}	Population 2020	Seat	Divisions			
Division code	Division	Area in km^{2}	Population 2020	Seat	Districts	Counties	Aut. counties	CL cities
430000	Hunan Province	210,000.00	66,444,864	Changsha city	36	61	7	18
430100	Changsha city	11,819.46	10,047,914	Yuelu District	6	1		2
430200	Zhuzhou city	11,262.20	3,902,738	Tianyuan District	5	3		1
430300	Xiangtan city	5,006.46	2,726,181	Yuetang District	2	1		2
430400	Hengyang city	15,302.78	6,645,243	Zhengxiang District	5	5		2
430500	Shaoyang city	20,829.63	6,563,520	Daxiang District	3	6	1	2
430600	Yueyang city	14,897.88	5,051,922	Yueyanglou District	3	4		2
430700	Changde city	18,177.18	5,279,102	Wuling District	2	6		1
430800	Zhangjiajie city	9,516.03	1,517,027	Yongding District	2	2		
430900	Yiyang city	12,325.16	3,851,564	Heshan District	2	3		1
431000	Chenzhou city	19,317.33	4,667,134	Beihu District	2	8		1
431100	Yongzhou city	22,255.31	5,289,824	Lengshuitan District	2	8	1	
431200	Huaihua city	27,562.72	4,587,594	Hecheng District	1	5	5	1
431300	Loudi city	8,107.61	3,826,996	Louxing District	1	2		2
433100	Xiangxi Autonomous Prefecture	15,462.30	2,488,105	Jishou city		7		1

Administrative divisions in Chinese and varieties of romanizations
English	Chinese	Pinyin	Xiang Romanization
Hunan Province	湖南省	Húnán Shěng	fu12 nan12 sǝn2
Changsha city	长沙市	Chángshā Shì	c̣an2 sa11 ṣî32
Zhuzhou city	株洲市	Zhūzhōu Shì	ćy11 c̣ôu11 ṣî32
Xiangtan city	湘潭市	Xiāngtán Shì	? ? ṣî32
Hengyang city	衡阳市	Héngyáng Shì	xǝn12 ian12 ṣî32
Shaoyang city	邵阳市	Shàoyáng Shì	? ian12 ṣî32
Yueyang city	岳阳市	Yuèyáng Shì	io4 ian12 ṣî32
Changde city	常德市	Chángdé Shì	? tô4 ṣî32
Zhangjiajie city	张家界市	Zhāngjiājiè Shì	? ćia11 kai31 ṣî32
Yiyang city	益阳市	Yìyáng Shì	i4 ian12 ṣî32
Chenzhou city	郴州市	Chēnzhōu Shì	? c̣ôu11 ṣî32
Yongzhou city	永州市	Yǒngzhōu Shì	yn2 c̣ôu11 ṣî32
Huaihua city	怀化市	Huáihuà Shì	fai12 fa31 ṣî32
Loudi city	娄底市	Lóudǐ Shì	? ti2 ṣî32
Xiangxi Autonomous Prefecture	湘西自治州	Xiāngxī Zìzhìzhōu	? si11 ci31 c̣î31 c̣ôu11

The fourteen prefecture-level divisions of Hunan are subdivided into 122 county-level divisions (35 districts, 17 county-level cities, 63 counties, 7 autonomous counties). Those are in turn divided into 2587 township-level divisions (1098 towns, 1,158 townships, 98 ethnic townships, 225 subdistricts, and eight district public offices). At the year end of 2017, the total population is 68.6 million.

Population by urban areas of prefecture & county cities
#	City	Urban area	District area	City proper	Census date
1	Changsha (Note: New district established after census: Wangcheng (Wangcheng County). The new district not included in the urban area and district area count of the pre-expanded city.)	2,963,218	3,092,213	7,040,952	2010-11-01
(1)	Changsha (new district)	230,136	523,660	see Changsha	2010-11-01
2	Hengyang	1,115,645	1,133,967	7,148,344	2010-11-01
3	Zhuzhou (Note: New district established after census: Lukou (Zhuzhou County). The new district not included in the urban area and district area count of the pre-expanded city.)	999,404	1,055,150	3,857,100	2010-11-01
(3)	Zhuzhou (new district)	94,326	383,598	see Zhuzhou	2010-11-01
4	Yueyang	924,099	1,231,509	5,476,084	2010-11-01
5	Xiangtan	903,287	960,303	2,752,171	2010-11-01
6	Changde	846,308	1,457,419	5,714,623	2010-11-01
7	Yiyang	697,607	1,245,517	4,307,933	2010-11-01
8	Liuyang	588,081	1,279,469	see Changsha	2010-11-01
9	Chenzhou	582,971	822,534	4,583,531	2010-11-01
10	Shaoyang	574,527	753,194	7,071,735	2010-11-01
11	Yongzhou	540,930	1,020,715	5,194,275	2010-11-01
(12)	Ningxiang (Note: Ningxiang County is currently known as Ningxiang CLC after census.)	498,055	1,166,138	see Changsha	2010-11-01
13	Leiyang	476,173	1,151,554	see Hengyang	2010-11-01
14	Huaihua	472,687	552,622	4,741,673	2010-11-01
15	Liling	449,067	947,387	see Zhuzhou	2010-11-01
16	Loudi	425,037	496,744	3,784,634	2010-11-01
17	Changning	332,927	810,447	see Hengyang	2010-11-01
18	Miluo	321,074	692,080	see Yueyang	2010-11-01
19	Yuanjiang	281,097	666,270	see Yiyang	2010-11-01
20	Zhangjiajie	250,489	494,528	1,478,149	2010-11-01
21	Lianyuan	245,360	995,515	see Loudi	2010-11-01
22	Lengshuijiang	238,275	327,146	see Loudi	2010-11-01
23	Linxiang	225,054	498,319	see Yueyang	2010-11-01
24	Zixing	215,707	337,294	see Chenzhou	2010-11-01
25	Jishou	212,328	302,065	part of Xiangxi Prefecture	2010-11-01
26	Xiangxiang	210,799	788,216	see Xiangtan	2010-11-01
27	Hongjiang	197,753	477,996	see Huaihua	2010-11-01
28	Wugang	187,436	734,870	see Shaoyang	2010-11-01
29	Jinshi	156,230	250,898	see Changde	2010-11-01
30	Shaoshan	27,613	86,036	see Xiangtan	2010-11-01

== Politics ==
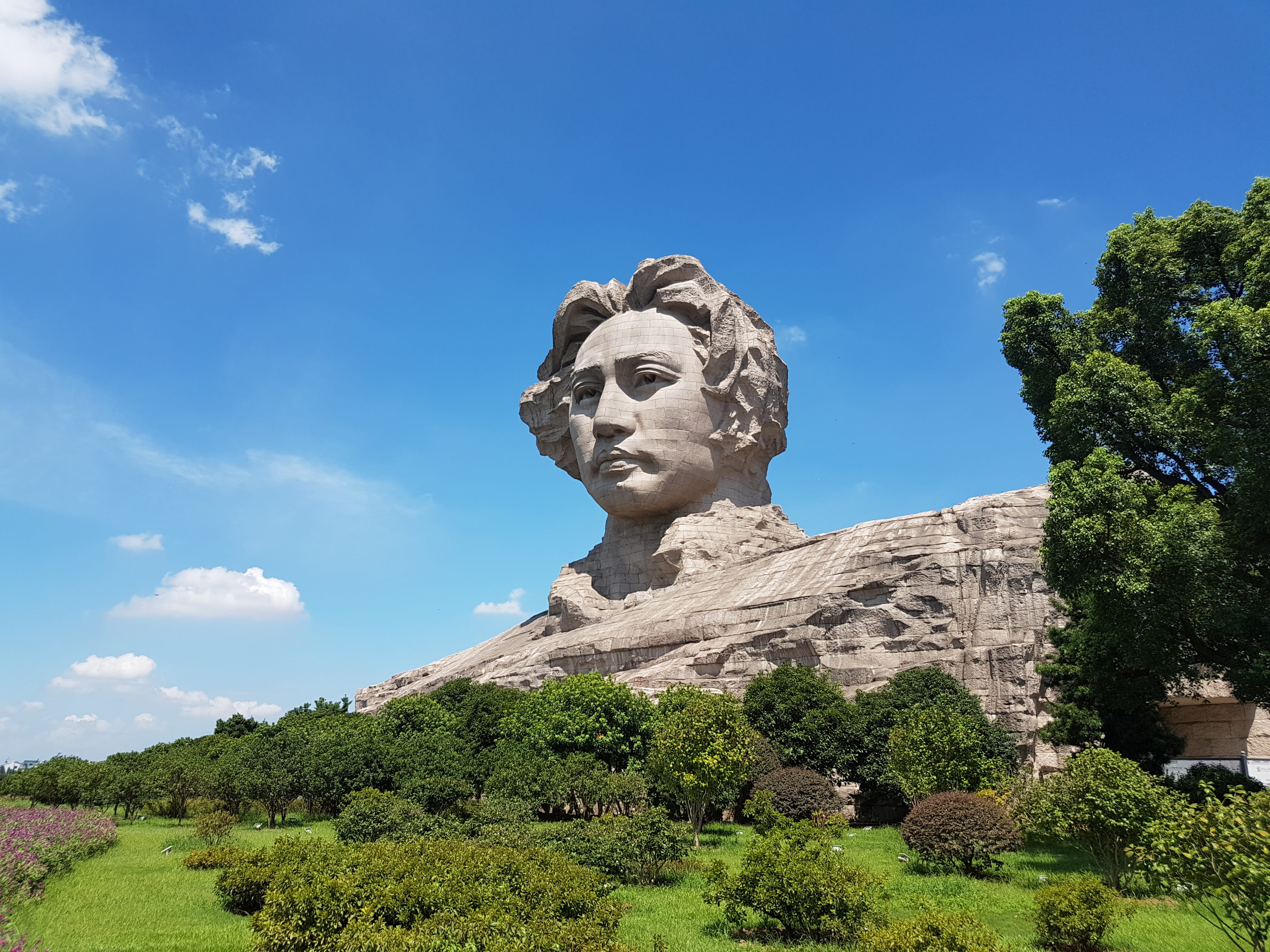
Young Mao Zedong statue in Changsha

The politics of Hunan is structured in a dual party-government system like all other governing institutions in mainland China.

The Governor of Hunan is the highest-ranking official in the People's Government of Hunan. However, in the province's dual party-government governing system, the Governor has less power than the Hunan Chinese Communist Party Provincial Committee Secretary, colloquially termed the "Hunan CCP Party Chief".

== Economy ==
Hunan is the 10th-largest provincial economy of China, the third largest in the Central China region after Henan and Hubei, the fourth largest in the South Central China region after Guangdong, Henan and Hubei and the fourth largest among inland provinces after Sichuan, Henan and Hubei. As of 2025, Hunan's nominal GDP was US$790 billion (CN¥5.53 trillion), appearing in the world's top 20 largest sub-national economies, with its GDP (PPP) being over US$1.62 trillion. Its nominal GDP per capita exceeded ¥84,583 (US$11,900 or US$24,804 in PPP), making it the third-richest province in South Central China, after Guangdong and Hubei.

As of 2020, Hunan's GDP (nominal) was US$605 billion, making it larger than the economies of Poland (the 22nd largest in the world), Thailand (the 2nd largest in ASEAN), and Nigeria (the largest in Africa).

As of the mid-19th century, Hunan exported rhubarb, musk, honey, tobacco, hemp, and birds. The Lake Dongting area is an important center of ramie production, and Hunan is also an important center of tea cultivation. Hunan was a major recipient of China's investment in industrial capacity during the Third Front campaign.

In recent years, Hunan has grown to become an important center for steel, machinery and electronics production, especially as China's manufacturing sector moves away from coastal provinces such as Guangdong and Zhejiang. The Lengshuijiang area is noted for its stibnite mines, and is one of the major centers of antimony extraction in China.

Hunan is also well known for a few global makers of construction equipment such as concrete pumps, cranes, etc. These companies include Sany Group, Zoomlion and Sunward. Sany is one of the world's major players. The city of Liuyang is the world's top center for manufacturing fireworks.

Historical GDP of Hunan Province for 1952 –present (SNA2008) (purchasing power parity of Chinese Yuan, as Int'l. dollar based on IMF WEO October 2017)
year	GDP				GDP per capita (GDPpc) based on mid-year population			Reference index	
year	GDP in millions			real growth (%)	GDPpc			exchange rate 1 foreign currency to CNY	
year	CNY	USD	PPP (Int'l$.)	real growth (%)	CNY	USD	PPP (Int'l$.)	USD 1	Int'l$. 1 (PPP)
2016	3,155,137	475,007	901,236	8.0	46,382	6,983	13,249	6.6423	3.5009
2015	2,917,217	468,373	821,867	8.5	43,157	6,929	12,159	6.2284	3.5495
2014	2,728,177	444,126	768,414	9.5	40,635	6,615	11,445	6.1428	3.5504
2013	2,483,465	400,999	694,307	10.1	37,263	6,017	10,418	6.1932	3.5769
2012	2,233,833	353,875	629,107	11.4	33,758	5,348	9,507	6.3125	3.5508
2011	1,981,655	306,815	565,299	12.8	30,103	4,661	8,587	6.4588	3.5055
2010	1,615,325	238,618	487,925	14.6	24,897	3,678	7,520	6.7695	3.3106
2009	1,315,627	192,597	416,667	13.9	20,579	3,013	6,517	6.8310	3.1575
2008	1,162,761	167,422	366,016	14.1	18,261	2,629	5,748	6.9451	3.1768
2007	948,599	124,750	314,637	15.1	14,942	1,965	4,956	7.6040	3.0149
2006	772,232	96,870	268,350	12.8	12,192	1,529	4,237	7.9718	2.8777
2005	662,345	80,856	231,670	12.2	10,606	1,295	3,710	8.1917	2.8590
2000	355,149	42,901	130,603	9.0	5,425	655	1,995	8.2784	2.7193
1995	213,213	25,531	78,117	10.3	3,359	402	1,231	8.3510	2.7294
1990	74,444	15,564	43,724	4.0	1,228	257	721	4.7832	1.7026
1985	34,995	11,917	24,966	12.1	626	213	447	2.9366	1.4017
1980	19,172	12,795	12,820	5.2	365	244	244	1.4984	1.4955
1975	11,840	6,366		10.3	239	129		1.8598	
1970	9,305	3,780		17.6	211	86		2.4618	
1965	6,532	2,653		13.2	170	69		2.4618	
1960	6,407	2,603		-1.0	176	71		2.4618	
1955	3,583	1,376		18.5	104	40		2.6040	
1952	2,781	1,251			86	39		2.2227	

=== Economic and technological development zones ===
- Changsha National Economic and Technical Development Zone

The Changsha National Economic and Technology Development Zone was founded in 1992. It is located east of Changsha. The total planned area is 38.6 km^{2} (14.9 sq mi) and the current area is 14 km^{2} (5.4 sq mi). Near the zone is National Highways G319 and G107 as well as Jingzhu Highway. Besides that, it is very close to the downtown and the railway station. The distance between the zone and the airport is 8 km (5.0 mi). The major industries in the zone include high-tech industry, biology project technology and new material industry.

- Changsha National New & Hi-Tech Industrial Development Zone
- Chenzhou Export Processing Zone

Approved by the State Council, Chenzhou Export processing Zone (CEPZ) was established in 2005 and is the only export processing zone in Hunan province. The scheduled production area of CEPZ covers 3km2. The industrial positioning of CEPZ is to concentrate on developing export-oriented hi-tech industries, including electronic information, precision machinery, and new-type materials. The zone has good infrastructure, and the enterprises inside could enjoy the preferential policies of tax-exemption, tax-guarantee and tax-refunding. By the end of the "Eleventh Five-Year Plan", the CEPZ achieved a total export and import volume of over US$1 billion and provided more than 50,000 jobs. It aimed to be one of the first-class export processing zones in China.

- Zhuzhou National New & Hi-Tech Industrial Development Zone

Zhuzhou Hi-Tech Industrial Development Zone was founded in 1992. Its total planned area is 35 km^{2} (14 sq mi). It is very close to National Highway G320. The major industries in the zone include biotechnology, food processing and heavy industry. In 2007, the park signed a cooperation contract with Beijing Automobile Industry, one of the largest auto makers in China, which will set up a manufacturing base in Zhuzhou HTP.

== Demographics ==
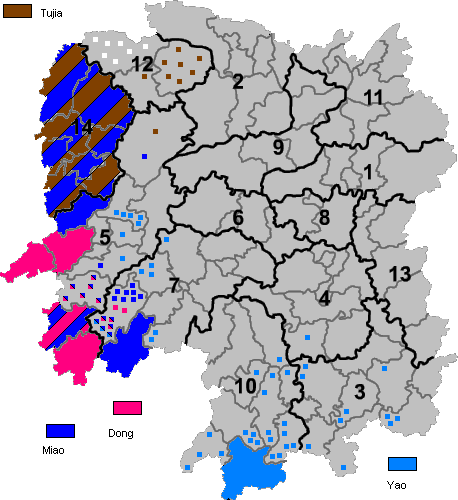
Ethnic minority-inhabited areas in Hunan

Historical population
Year	Pop.	±%
1912	27,617,000	—
1928	31,501,000	+14.1%
1936–37	28,294,000	−10.2%
1947	25,558,000	−9.7%
1954	33,226,954	+30.0%
1964	37,182,286	+11.9%
1982	54,008,851	+45.3%
1990	60,659,754	+12.3%
2000	63,274,173	+4.3%
2010	65,683,722	+3.8%
2020	66,444,864	+1.2%

As of the 2000 census, the population of Hunan is 64,400,700 consisting of forty-one ethnic groups. Its population grew 6.17% (3,742,700) from its 1990 levels. According to the census, 89.79% (57,540,000) identified themselves as Han Chinese and 10.21% (6,575,300) as minority groups. The minority groups are Tujia, Miao, Dong, Yao, Bai, Hui, Zhuang, Uyghurs and so on.

In Hunan, ethnic minority languages are spoken in the following prefectures.

- Xiangxi Tujia and Miao Autonomous Prefecture: Qo Xiong language, Tujia language
- Huaihua: Qo Xiong language, Dong language, Hm Nai language, Hmu language
- Shaoyang: Maojia language, Hm Nai language, Pa-Hng language, Badong Yao language
- Yongzhou: Mien language, Biao Min language
- Chenzhou: Dzao Min language
Religion in Hunan (Note: The data was collected by the Chinese General Social Survey (CGSS) of 2009 and by the Chinese Spiritual Life Survey (CSLS) of 2007, reported and assembled by Xiuhua Wang (2015) in order to confront the proportion of people identifying with two similar social structures: ① Christian churches, and ② the traditional Chinese religion of the lineage (i.e. people believing and worshipping ancestral deities often organised into lineage "churches" and ancestral shrines). Data for other religions with a significant presence in China (deity cults, Buddhism, Taoism, folk religious sects, Islam, et al.) was not reported by Wang.)
1. Chinese Buddhism，Taoist traditions and Chinese folk religions (20.2%)
2. Christianity (0.77%)
3. Other religions or not religious people (Note: This may include: Buddhists; Confucians; Deity worshippers; Taoists; Members of folk religious sects; Small minorities of Muslims; And people not bounded to, nor practicing any, institutional or diffuse religion.) (79.0%)

=== Hunanese Uyghurs ===
Around 5,000 Uyghurs live around Taoyuan County and other parts of Changde. Hui and Uyghurs have intermarried in this area. In addition to eating pork, the Uygurs of Changde practice other Han Chinese customs, like ancestor worship at graves. Some Uyghurs from Xinjiang visit the Hunan Uyghurs out of curiosity or interest. The Uyghurs of Hunan do not speak the Uyghur language, instead, Mandarin Chinese is spoken as their native language.

=== Religion ===
The predominant religions in Hunan are Chinese Buddhism, Taoist traditions and Chinese folk religions. According to surveys conducted in 2007 and 2009, 20.19% of the population believes and is involved in ancestor veneration, while 0.77% of the population identifies as Christian. The reports did not give figures for other types of religion; 79.04% of the population may be either irreligious or involved in worship of nature deities, Buddhism, Confucianism, Taoism, folk religious sects.

In 2010, there are 118.799 Muslims in Hunan.

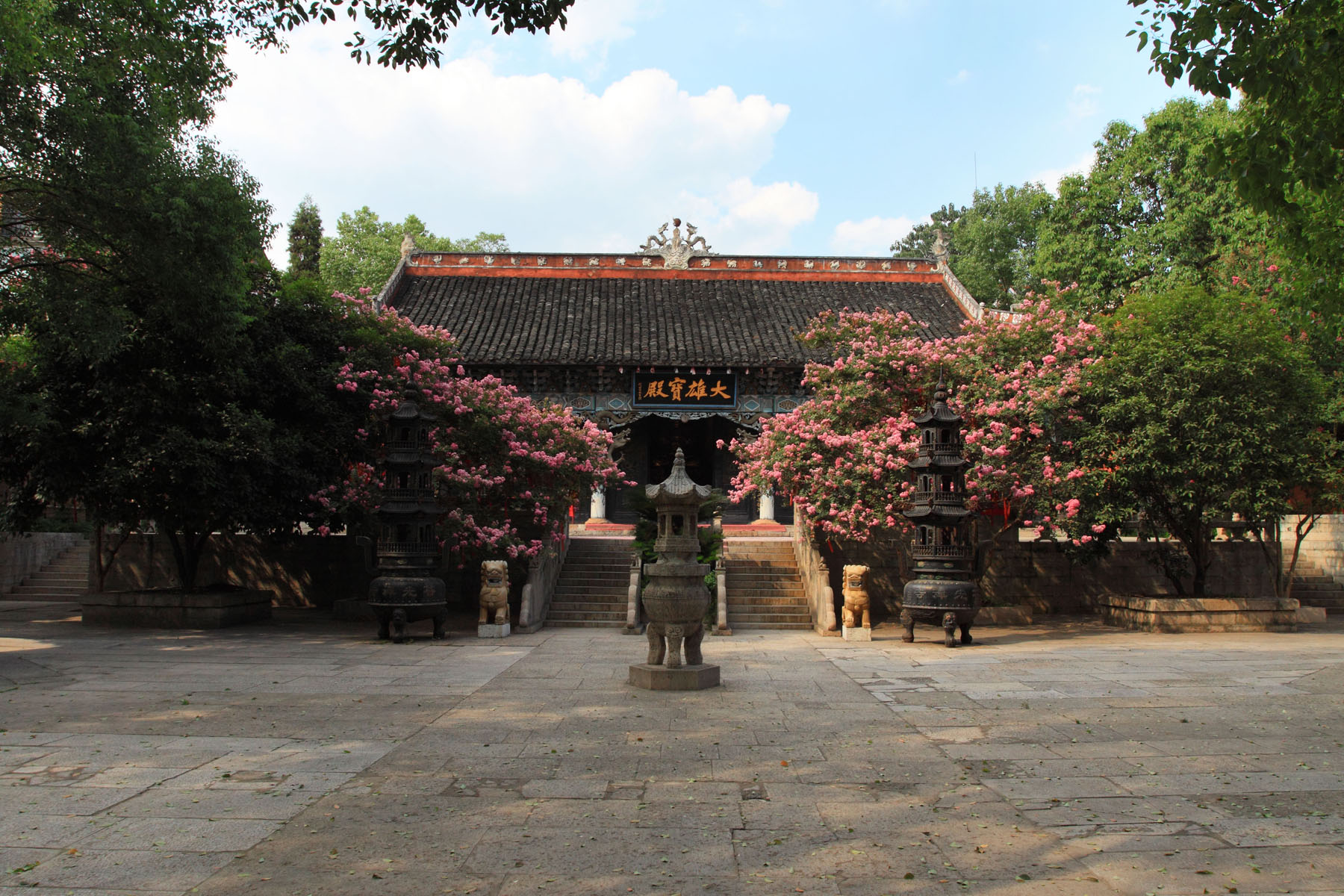
Puguang Buddhist Temple in Zhangjiajie.

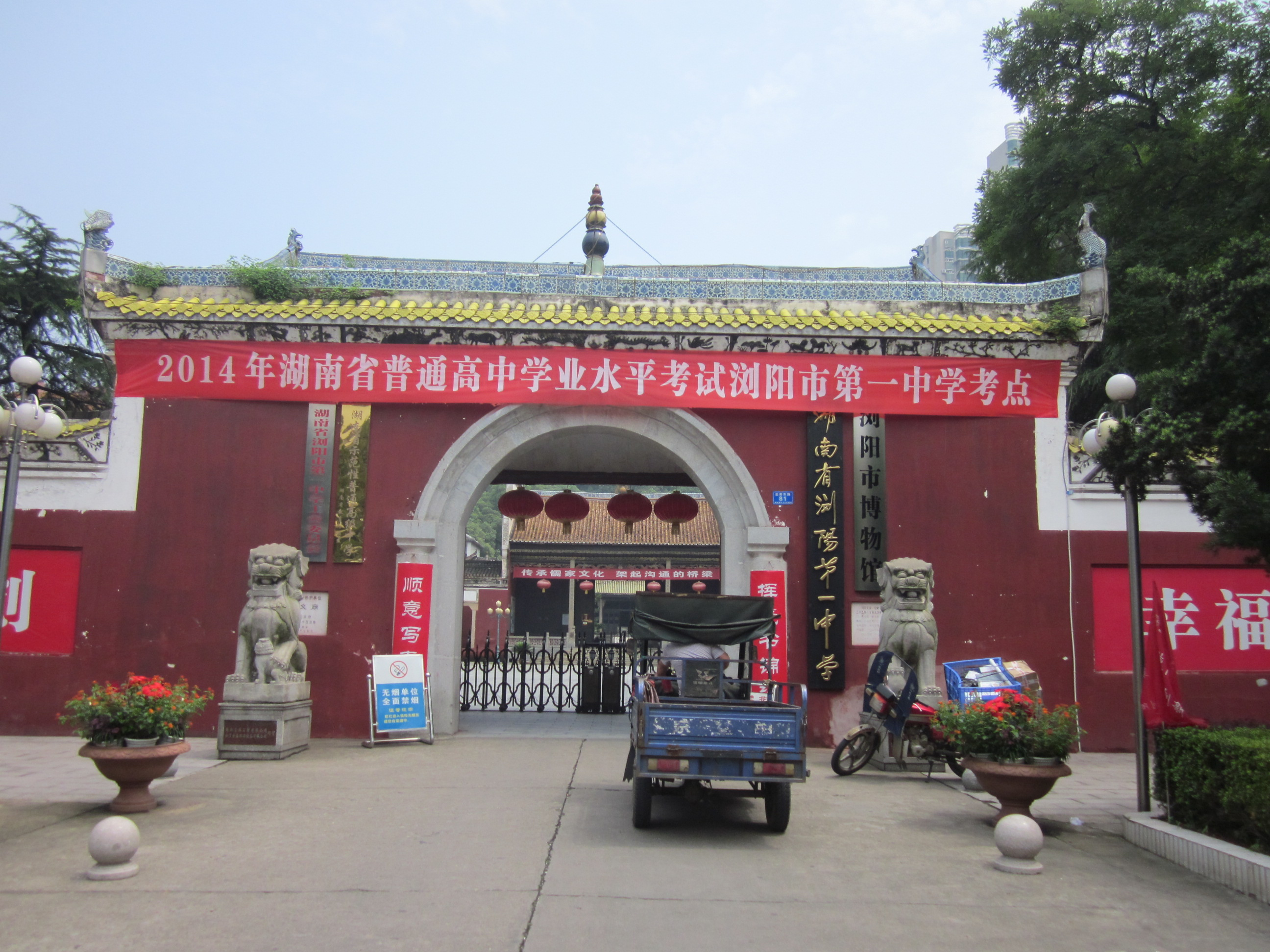
Temple of Confucius in Liuyang.

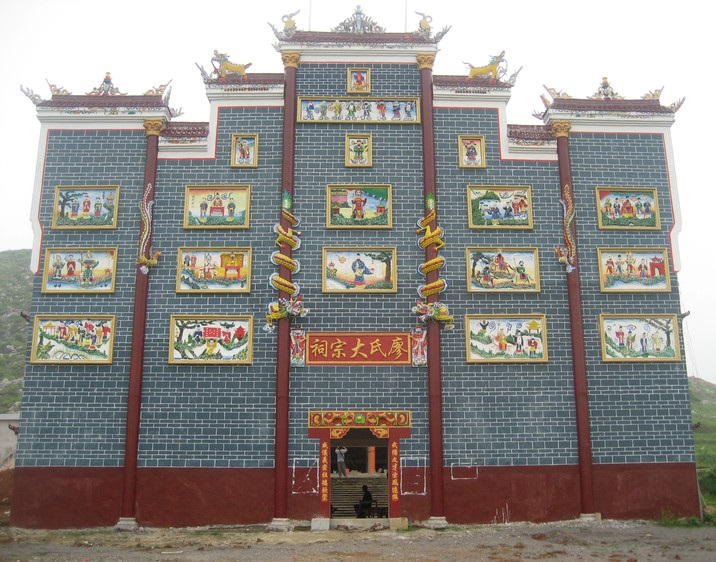
An ancestral shrine in the province.

== Notable people ==
During the late late Qing Era, Hunan emerged as the epicenter of revolution and reform in China, giving rise to many of the nation's most renowned scholars, politicians, and military leaders, including the most influential and controversial figure of China in the 20th century, Mao Zedong.

Hunanese were pioneers in embracing foreign ideas, as seen in the works of 19th-century thinkers like Wei Yuan (魏源). As the saying goes among Chinese historians: "Hunanese shaped half of modern Chinese history" (一部中国近代史，半部由湖南写就). Their profound and enduring influence on China's politics and society persisted well into recent times.

- Zhou Dunyi (1017–1073), Chinese scholar and philosopher
- Wang Fuzhi (1619–1692), Chinese essayist, historian, and philosopher of the late Ming, early Qing dynasties.
- Zeng Guofan (1811–1872)
- Zuo Zongtang (1812–1885), or General Tso, Chinese statesman and military leader of the late Qing dynasty.
- Taqibu (1816–1855)
- Huang Xing (1874–1916)
- Cai E (1882–1916), Chinese revolutionary leader, General and Governor of Yunnan (1911–1913)
- Jiang Xiaowan (?–1922), interpreter
- Mao Zedong (1893–1976)
- He Long (1896–1969)
- Peng Dehuai (1898–1974)
- Liu Shaoqi (1898–1969)
- Ma Ying-jeou (born 1950)
- Yuet-ching Lee (1918–1997), Hong Kong actress
- Ted Hui (born 1982), Hong Kong politician
- Martin Cao (born 1993), racing driver
- Zhou Chengzhou (born 1982), Chinese film director and artist
- Lexie Liu (born 1998), singer
- Jackson Yee (born 2000), actor and singer

== Culture ==
As of 2022, Hunan's culture and related industries achieved an added value of CN¥250.65 billion (US$37.27 billion), accounting for 5.27% of the province's GDP. Among them, the added value of cultural services was CN¥150.20 billion (US$22.33 billion), the added value of cultural manufacturing was CN¥78.28 billion (US$11.64 billion), the added value of cultural wholesale and retail was CN¥22.17 billion (US$3.30 billion).

In 2023, there are 655 art groups, 149 mass art galleries and cultural centers, 148 public libraries, 180 museums and memorial halls, 108 radio and television stations, 5.853 million cable TV users, and 27.441 million fiber optic Internet broadband users all connected to cable TV. The comprehensive population coverage rate of radio is 99.43%, and the comprehensive population coverage rate of television is 99.77%. There are 137 national intangible cultural heritage protection lists and 410 provincial intangible cultural heritage protection lists. 12,078 books, 235 periodicals, and 44 newspapers have been published, with a total print run of 590 million books, 80 million periodicals, and 500 million newspapers.

=== Language ===
Hunan is a region with complex dialects. The dialects in the province include Xiang, Southwestern Mandarin, Gan, Hakka, and some local dialects whose identities have not yet been determined, such as Xiangnan Tuhua and Waxiang dialect. In areas where ethnic minorities live, many people can speak their own ethnic language and communicate in Chinese.

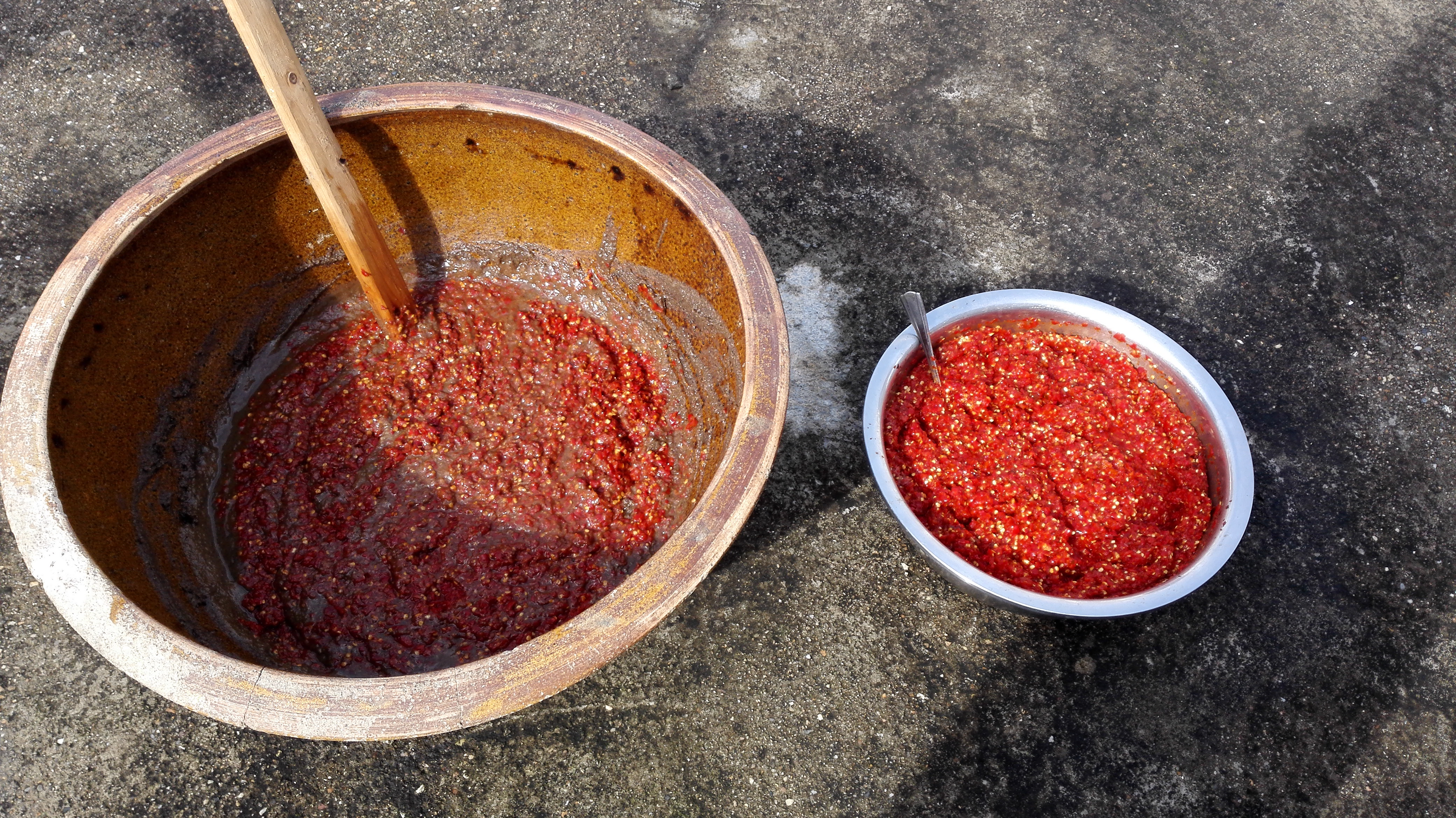
Yongfeng chili sauce

=== Cuisine ===
Hunanese cuisine is noted for its near-ubiquitous use of chili peppers, garlic, and shallots. These ingredients give rise to a distinctive dry-and-spicy (干辣; gānlà) taste, with dishes such as smoked cured ham and stir-fried spicy beef being prime examples of the flavor.

=== Music ===
Huaguxi is a local form of Chinese opera that is very popular in Hunan province.

== Tourism ==
Located in the south central part of China, Hunan has long been known for its natural environment. It is surrounded by mountains on the east, west, and south, and by the Yangtze River on the north. For thousands of years, the region has been a major center of agriculture, growing rice, tea, and oranges. China's first all glass suspension bridge was also opened in Hunan, in Shiniuzhai National Geological Park.

- Wulingyuan is a World Heritage Site and a 5A Scenic Area. Located in south-central Hunan, Wulingyuan is noted for its thousands of quartzite sandstone pillars, caves, and waterfalls. The area also contains Zhangjiajie National Forest Park.
- Shaoshan County, known for being the birthplace of Mao Zedong
- Yueyang Tower, on the shores of Lake Dongting, was built in the Han and Jin dynasties, and has existed in its current state since the Qing Dynasty. Alongside the Pavilion of Prince Teng and Yellow Crane Tower, it is one of the Three Great Towers of Jiangnan.
- Mount Heng, in Hengyang, is one of the Five Great Mountains of China, and is home to the largest temple in southern China.
- Fenghuang County, in Xiangxi Prefecture, has been placed on the UNESCO World Heritage Tentative List for its ancient town. Fenghuang is known for its incorporation of mountain features and water flow into city design, and the ancient syncretism between the local Han and Miao cultures.

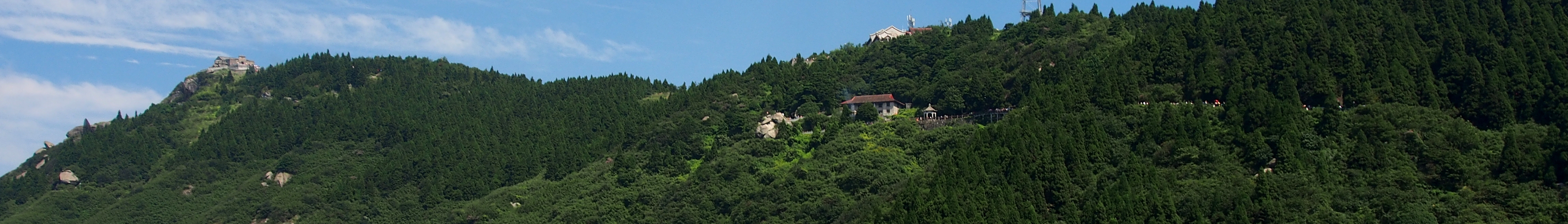
Panoramic view of Mount Heng

== Education and research ==
As of 2023, Hunan hosts 137 institutions of higher education, ranking fifth together with Sichuan (137) among all Chinese provinces after Jiangsu (168), Henan (168), Guangdong (162), and Shandong (156). Hunan is also the seat of 12 adult higher education institutions. Two major cities in Hunan (Changsha and Xiangtan) were ranked in the top 200 cities in the world by scientific research output, as tracked by the Nature Index in 2024. There are three national key universities under Project 985 (Hunan University, Central South University and the National University of Defense Technology) in Hunan, the third highest after Beijing and Shanghai. Hunan Normal University in Changsha is the key construction university of the national 211 Project, and Xiangtan University in Xiangtan is a key university jointly built by Hunan Province and the Ministry of Education and a member of national Project 111. These five national key universities are included in the Double First-Class Construction of Hunan Province. As of 2024, they are ranked among the top 500 globally by the Nature Index. Among them, Hunan University and Central South University are in the top 50.

Hunan University and Central South University are the only two Project 985 universities in Changsha, Hunan to appear in the world's top 200 of the Academic Ranking of World Universities and the U.S. News & World Report Best Global University Ranking. Hunan Normal University, the National University of Defense and Technology and Changsha University of Science and Technology located in Changsha, were ranked in the world's top 701 of the Academic Ranking of World Universities.

Hunan Agricultural University in Changsha, the University of South China in Hengyang, Hunan University of Technology in Zhuzhou and Xiangtan University in Xiangtan were ranked in the top 801–900 globally by the Academic Ranking of World Universities. Hunan University of Science and Technology in Xiangtan and Central South University of Forestry and Technology in Changsha were ranked number 988 and number 1429 respectively in the 2022 Best Global Universities by the U.S. News & World Report Best Global University Ranking. As of 2023, Hunan University of Chinese Medicine in Changsha ranked the best in the Central China region and 26th nationwide among Chinese Medical Universities.

=== National key public universities ===
==== Changsha City ====
- Central South University (Project 211, Project 985, Double First Class University)
- Hunan University (Project 211, Project 985, Double First Class University)
- Hunan Normal University (Project 211, Double First Class University)
- National University of Defense Technology (Project 211, Project 985, Double First Class University)

==== Xiangtan City ====
- Xiangtan University (Project 111, Double First Class University)

=== Provincial key public universities ===
==== Changsha City ====
- Central South University of Forestry and Technology
- Changsha University of Science and Technology
- Hunan Agricultural University
- Hunan First Normal University
- Hunan University of Chinese Medicine
- Hunan University of Technology and Commerce

==== Hengyang City ====
- Hengyang Normal University
- University of South China

==== Jishou City ====
- Jishou University

==== Loudi City ====
- Hunan University of Humanities, Science and Technology

==== Shaoyang City ====
- Shaoyang University

==== Xiangtan City ====
- Hunan Institute of Engineering
- Hunan University of Science and Technology

==== Yueyang City ====
- Hunan Institute of Science and Technology

==== Zhuzhou City ====
- Hunan University of Technology

=== General undergraduate universities (public) ===
==== Changsha City ====
- Changsha Normal University
- Changsha University
- Hunan University of Finance and Economics
- Hunan Police Academy
- Hunan Women's University

==== Hengyang City ====
- Hunan Institute of Technology

==== Xiangtan City ====
- Xiangtan Institute of Technology

==== Yongzhou City ====
- Hunan University of Science and Engineering

==== Chenzhou City ====
- Xiangnan University

=== General undergraduate universities (private) ===
- Changsha Medical University
- Hunan International Economics University
- Hunan Institute of Information Technology
- Hunan Institute of Traffic Engineering
- Hunan Applied Technology University

=== Vocational and technical colleges/universities ===
- Changsha Aeronautical Vocational and Technical College
- Changsha Social Work College
- Hunan Mass Media Vocational and Technical College
- Changde Vocational and Technical College

== Transport ==
=== Airports ===
There are several airports in Hunan province, including Changsha Huanghua International Airport, Zhangjiajie Hehua International Airport, Changde Taohuayuan Airport, Chenzhou Beihu Airport, Huaihua Zhijiang Airport, Shaoyang Wugang Airport, Yongzhou Lingling Airport, and Yueyang Sanhe Airport. The busiest airports serve domestic and international flights for Hunan, including Changsha Huanghua International Airport, Zhangjiajie Hehua International Airport and Changde Taohuayuan Airport. Notably, as of 2021, Changsha Huanghua International Airport was one of the 50 busiest airports in the world, the 12th busiest civil airport in China, the second busiest in South Central China after Guangzhou Baiyun International Airport and the busiest in Central China.

=== Railways ===
The Beijing–Guangzhou high-speed railway passes through Hunan.

== Sports ==
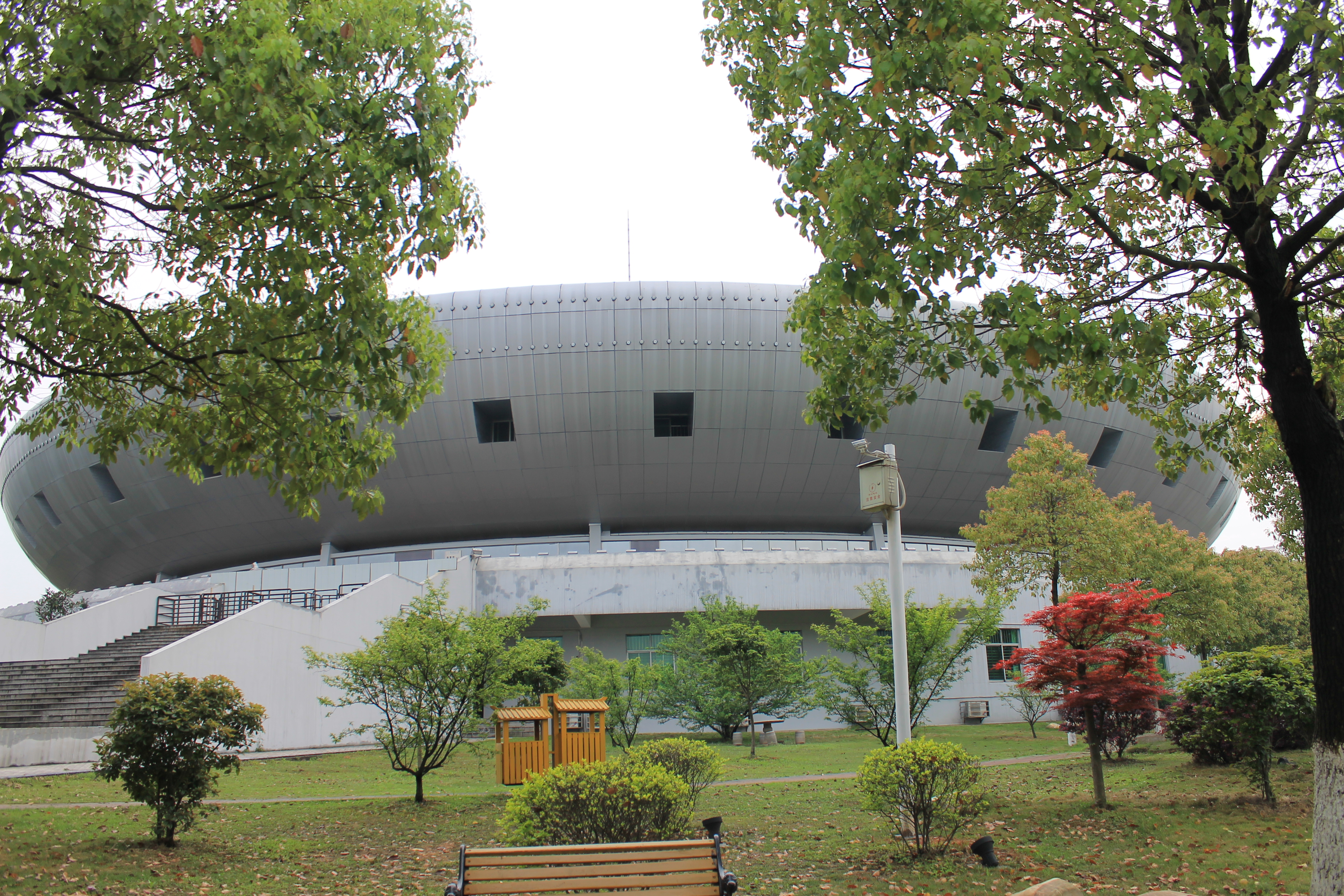
Yiyang Olympic Stadium

Professional sports teams in Hunan include:

- Chinese Football Association League One
  - Hunan Billows F.C.
- Hunan Football League teams

== See also ==
- Major national historical and cultural sites in Hunan
- Xiaoxiang, the "lakes and rivers" region of south-central China
- State of Chu, ancient Chinese state partly in modern-day Hunan
- Hunanese people
