= Shiniuzhai National Geological Park =

Protected area in Hunan, China

Shiniuzhai National Geological Park or Pingjiang Shiniuzhai Geopark (石牛寨) is in Hunan, in Pingjiang County. It is 46 km away from the nearest city of Pingjiang. ShinNiuzhai is 523 meters above sea level and has a radius of more than 10 square kilometres. It is one of the protected areas of China.

== Shiniuzhai National Geological Park ==
=== History ===
The name Shi Niu Zhai originates from the boulder resembling a cattle in the western part of the park. Shi Nui Zhai used to be an important place for military affairs. According to a historian in the western province, Shi Niu Zhai is the last remaining shanzhai of the 48 in Liuyang.

=== Geography ===
Shi Niu Zhai is a national park mainly composed of the Danxia landform, a red bed with steep cliffs.

=== Tourism ===
The 3 main attractions of Shiniuzhai include Ten Miles Cliff (十里绝壁), Hundred Miles Danxia (百里丹霞) and Brave Men's Bridge (高空玻璃桥).

The Ten Miles cliff is located at the park's center and is one of China's biggest Danxia cliffs. The Hundred Miles Danxia is situated at the peak of Shi Nui Zhai, where one can see the entire landscape of many other Danxia Peaks.

=== Attractions ===
Shi Nui Zhai Park has developed many tourist attraction activities. It has one of the steepest cable cars in China; the highest and longest suspension bridge in Hunan, the Brave Men's Bridge; and Asia's longest zipline.

== Brave Men's Bridge ==
The Brave Men's Bridge (28.912357°N 113.980189°E) is a glass suspension bridge 300 meters long, elevated at a height of 180 meter above ground. It spans across two cliffs at 540 meters above sea level

The bridge's body comprises 2 main steel wires and 6 base steel wires with wooden planks as a base. It is the first high-altitude, glass-bottomed bridge built in China. The bridge was originally made of wood but converted to glass in 2014. The new glass bottom was made using glass panes 24mm thick and 25 times the strength of normal glass panels.

The origin of the name Brave Men's Bridge is passed down from word of mouth that anyone who is able to cross the fearsome bridge is a true brave man.

== Ten Miles Cliff ==
The Ten Miles Cliff is located in the Shiniuzhai National Geological Park. On the cliff, there is man-made plank structures built to serve as walking paths for the tourists.

== See also ==
- Zhangjiajie Glass Bridge
