= Xie Weijiang =

Chinese politician

- 谢卫江

Governor of Hunan
- Acting
- Assumed office 30 October 2026
- Party Secretary: Wang Zhijun
- Preceded by: Mao Weiming

Specifically-designated Deputy Party Secretary of Hunan
- In office 18 July 2025 – 24 October 2026
- Party Secretary: Shen Xiaoming
- Preceded by: Li Dianxun
- Succeeded by: Jin Wei

Party Secretary of Yueyang
- Incumbent
- Assumed office 15 December 2023
- Preceded by: Cao Puhua

Secretary-general of the Hunan Provincial Committee of the Chinese Communist Party
- In office December 2021 – December 2023
- Preceded by: Zhang Jianfei
- Succeeded by: Qin Guowen

Vice Governor of Hunan
- In office 25 September 2020 – 3 December 2021
- Governor: Mao Weiming

Personal details
- Born: January 1973 (age 53) Fugou County, Henan, China
- Party: Chinese Communist Party (1992-)
- Education: North China Electric Power University; Southeast University

Xie Weijiang (Chinese: 谢卫江; born January 1973) is a Chinese politician, currently serving as the governor of Hunan since October 2026 and the party secretary of Yueyang since December 2023. Previously he was served as the specifically-designated deputy party secretary of Hunan, and the vice governor of Hunan.

== Career ==
Xie was born in Fugou County, Henan in January 1973. In 1990, he was enrolled to North China Electric Power University and graduated in 1994. Later he was enrolled to the thermal energy research institute of Southeast University, and obtained a master's degree in 1997. He was joined the Chinese Communist Party in December 1992.

=== State-owned enterprise ===
In 1997, Xie was enrolled to China Water Resources & Electric Power Materials Corporation, and appointed as the deputy manager of general business department. In 2003, he was promoted to the manager.

In 2005, Xie was appointed as the deputy general engineer of China Water Resources & Electric Power Materials Corporation and the general manager of Beijing Guodian Engineering Tendering Co., Ltd. He was appointed as the general manager of Beijing Zhongtang Electric Engineering Consulting Co., Ltd.

In 2011, Xie was appointed as the deputy director of the materials management department of China Datang Group. He was returned to China Water Resources & Electric Power Materials Corporation and appointed as the general manager in 2015.

In 2016, Xie was appointed as the director of office of China Datang Group.

In August 2018, Xie was appointed as the deputy general manager of Harbin Electric Corporation.

=== Hunan ===
Xie was left the state-owned enterprise and appointed as the vice governor of Hunan in September 2020. In November 2021, Xie was appointed as the standing member of the Hunan Provincial Committee of the Chinese Communist Party. He was appointed as the secretary-general in December.

In December 2023, Xie was appointed as the party secretary of Yueyang. In July 2025, Xie was appointed as the specifically-designated deputy party secretary of Hunan.

On 24 October 2026, Xie was appointed as the party secretary of the Hunan Provincial People's Government, and appointed as the acting governor of Hunan on 30 October.

Party political offices
Preceded by Zhang Jianfei	Secretary-general of the Hunan Provincial Committee of the Chinese Communist Party; 2021–2023	Succeeded by Qin Guowen
Preceded by Cao Puhua	Party Secretary of Yueyang; 2023–	Incumbent
Preceded by Li Dianxun	Specifically-designated Deputy Party Secretary of Hunan; 2023–2025	Succeeded by Jin Wei
Government offices
Preceded by Mao Weiming	Governor of Hunan; 2026–	Incumbent
