= Hunan Provincial People's Congress =

Hunan Provincial People's Congress 湖南省人民代表大会
- 14th Hunan Provincial People's Congress

Type
- Type: Province-level people's congress

Leadership
- Chairman of the Standing Committee: Shen Xiaoming, CCP since January 2024

Elections
- Hunan Provincial People's Congress voting system: Plurality-at-large voting & Two-round system

Meeting place
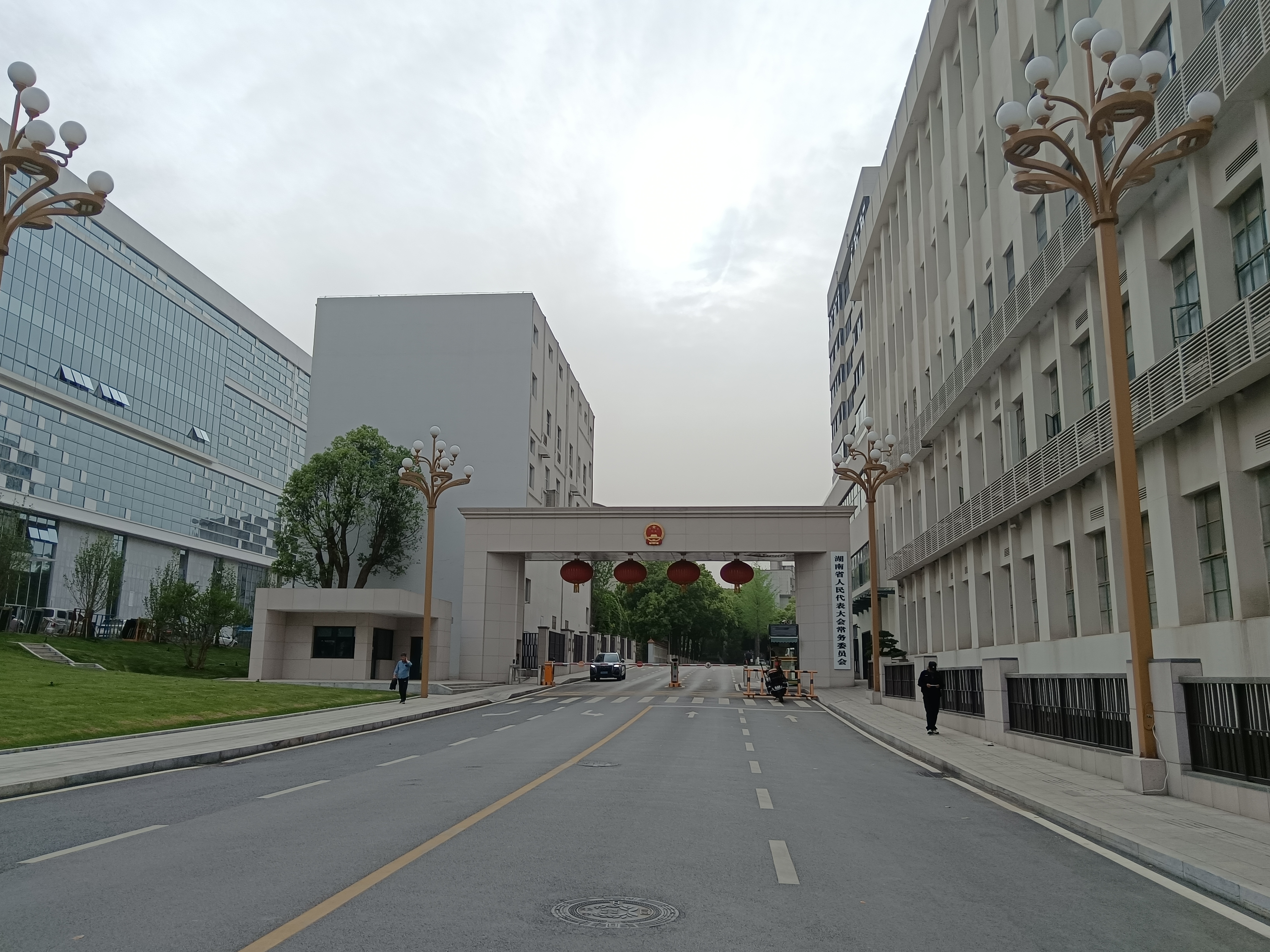

Website
- www.hnrd.gov.cn

Hunan Provincial People's Congress
- Simplified Chinese: 湖南省人民代表大会
- Traditional Chinese: 湖南省人民代表大會
Transcriptions
Standard Mandarin
- Hanyu Pinyin: Húnán Shěng Rénmín Dàibiǎo Dàhuì

The Hunan Provincial People's Congress is the people's congress of Hunan, a province of China. The Congress is elected for a term of five years. Hunan Provincial People's Congress meetings are held at least once a year. After a proposal by more than one-fifth of the deputies, a meeting of the people's congress at the corresponding level may be convened temporarily.

== History ==
In April 1954, 15,624 urban and rural political units in Hunan completed the first general election after the founding of the People's Republic of China. More than 320,000 township and town people's congress representatives were directly elected by voters, and township and town people's congresses were widely established. On this basis, 26,676 county and city people's congress representatives were indirectly elected by the township and town people's congresses, and 552 provincial people's congress representatives were indirectly elected by the county and city people's congresses. The 1st session of the 1st Hunan Provincial People's Congress was held in Changsha from August 10 to 14, 1954, marking the official establishment of local state power organs in Hunan.

During the Cultural Revolution from 1966 to 1977, the Hunan Provincial People's Congress ceased to operate.

In November 1977, the 1st session of the 5th Hunan Provincial People's Congress was held to resume activities. From December 21 to 28, 1979, the 2nd Session of the 5th People's Hunan Provincial People's Congress was held, and the Standing Committee was established as a permanent body during the recess period.

== Special Committees ==
- Ethnic, Overseas Chinese and Foreign Affairs Committee
- Constitution and Law Committee
- Supervisory and Judicial Affairs Committee
- Financial and Economic Affairs Committee
- Education, Science, Culture and Public Health Committee
- Environmental Protection and Resources Conservation Committee
- Agriculture and Rural Affairs Committee
- Social Development Affairs Committee

== Delegations ==
The 14th Hunan Provincial People's Congress has a total of 755 representatives elected by 15 electoral units:

1. Changsha Delegation (75 representatives)
2. Hengyang Delegation (75 representatives)
3. Zhuzhou Delegation (42 representatives)
4. Xiangtan Delegation (34 representatives)
5. Shaoyang Delegation (73 representatives)
6. Yueyang Delegation (57 representatives)
7. Changde Delegation (60 representatives)
8. Zhangjiajie Delegation (24 representatives)
9. Yiyang Delegation (47 representatives)
10. Chenzhou Delegation (51 representatives)
11. Yongzhou Delegation (59 representatives)
12. Huaihua Delegation (52 representatives)
13. Loudi Delegation (44 representatives)
14. Xiangxi Tujia and Miao Autonomous Prefecture Delegation (32 representatives)
15. PLA Armed Police Delegation (27 representatives)

== Leadership ==
Chairperson of the Hunan Provincial People's Congress
- 湖南省人民代表大会常务委员会主任
- National Emblem of the People's Republic of China
- Incumbent; Shen Xiaoming since January 2024
- Type: Chairperson
- Status: Provincial level official
- Appointer: Hunan Provincial People's Congress

=== Chairpersons ===
| Portrait | Name (English) | Name (Chinese) | Tenure begins | Tenure ends | Ref. |
|---|---|---|---|---|---|
| | Wan Da | 万达 | December 1979 | April 1983 | |
| | Sun Guozhi | 孙国治 | April 1983 | July 1985 | |
| | Jiao Linyi | 焦林义 | July 1985 | January 1988 | |
| | Liu Fusheng | 刘夫生 | January 1988 | January 1998 | |
| | Wang Maolin | 王茂林 | January 1998 | October 1998 | |
| | Wang Keying | 王克英 | October 1998 | January 1999 | |
| | Yang Zhengwu | 杨正午 | January 1999 | January 2006 | |
| | Zhang Chunxian | 张春贤 | January 2006 | September 2010 | |
| | Zhou Qiang | 周强 | September 2010 | May 2013 | |
| | Xu Shousheng | 徐守盛 | May 2013 | January 2017 | |
| | Du Jiahao | 杜家毫 | January 2017 | January 2021 | |
| | Xu Dazhe | 许达哲 | January 2021 | January 2022 | |
| | Zhang Qingwei | 张庆伟 | January 2022 | March 2023 | |
| | Shen Xiaoming | 沈晓明 | January 2024 | | |
