= Haihui Temple =

Haihui Temple could be several Buddhist temples：

- Haihui Temple (Xiangtan), in Xiangtan, Hunan, China
- Haihui Temple (Jiujiang), in Jiujiang, Jiangxi, China
- Haihui Temple (Yangcheng County), in Yangcheng County, Shanxi, China
- Haihui Temple (Yanggu County), in Yanggu County, Shandong, China
