= Yijiawan =

Yijiawan 易家湾镇
- Town
- Location within China
- Coordinates: 27°55′49″N 113°00′55″E
- Country: China
- Province: Hunan
- District: Yuetang
- Time zone: UTC+8 (China Standard)

Yijiawan (Chinese: 易家湾镇) is a town located in the Yuetang District of Xiangtan, Hunan, China.
