= Streptomyces aquilus =

Scientific classification
- Domain: Bacteria
- Kingdom: Bacillati
- Phylum: Actinomycetota
- Class: Actinomycetia
- Order: Streptomycetales
- Family: Streptomycetaceae
- Genus: Streptomyces
- Species: S. aquilus

Binomial name
- Streptomyces aquilus Li et al. 2020

Type strain
- GGCR-6

Species of bacterium

Streptomyces aquilus is a bacterium species from the genus Streptomyces which has been isolated from the leaves of the plant Xanthium sibiricum from the Hunan University of Science and Technology in China.

== See also ==
- List of Streptomyces species
