= Haihui Temple (Xiangtan) =

Buddhist temple in China

- 海会寺
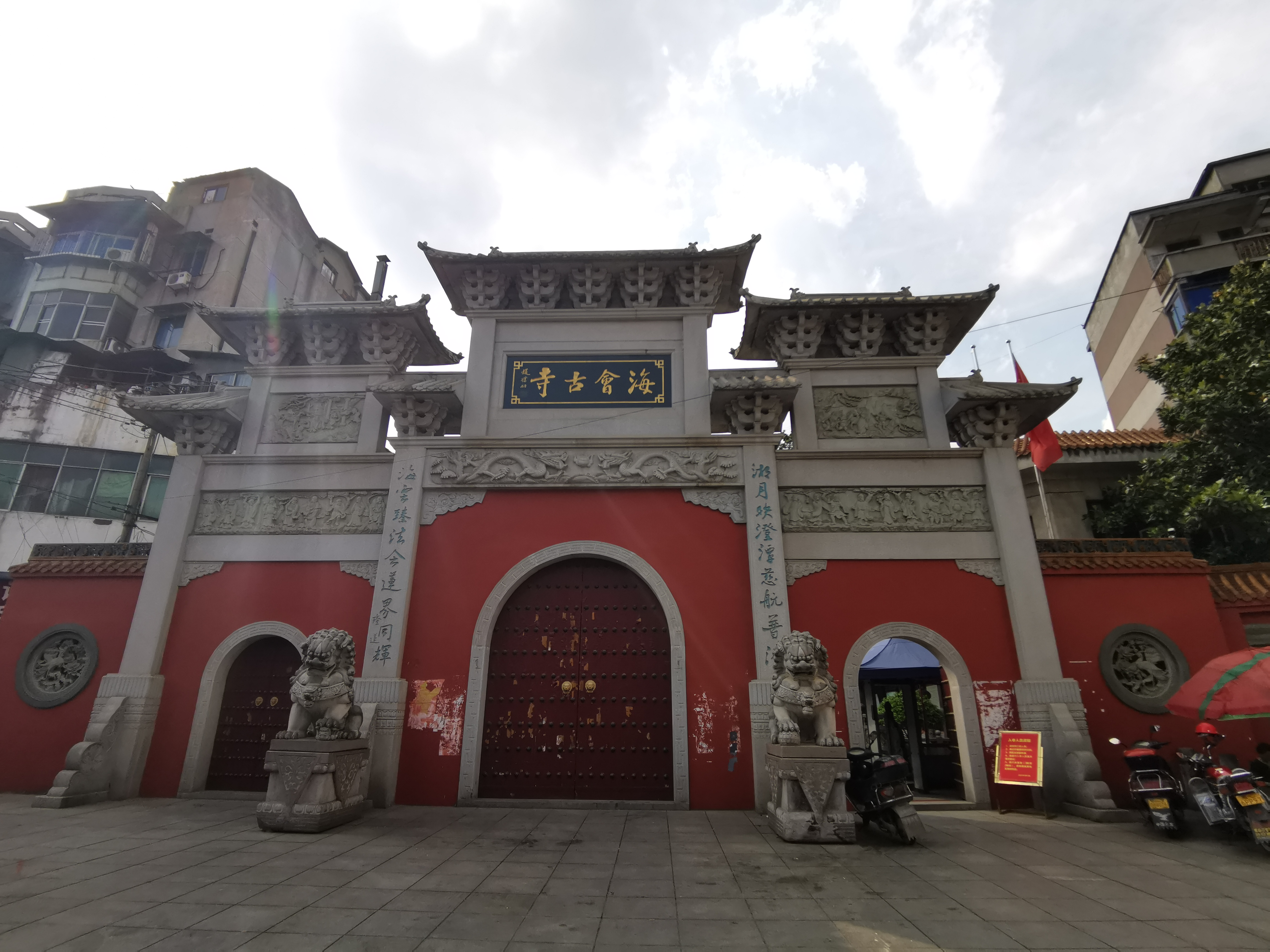
- Shanmen

- Location within Hunan Location within China

Religion
- Affiliation: Buddhism
- Sect: Chan Buddhism

Location
- Location: Yuhu District, Xiangtan, Hunan, China
- Interactive map of Haihui Temple
- Coordinates: 27°51′35″N 112°54′38″E

Architecture
- Style: Chinese architecture
- Founder: Shi Puzhong
- Established: Yuan dynasty (1271–1368)
- Materials: Bricks and cement

Haihui Temple (simplified Chinese: 海会寺; traditional Chinese: 海會寺; pinyin: Hǎihuì Sì) is a Buddhist temple located in Yuhu District, Xiangtan, Hunan, China. It is the site of Xiangtan Buddhist Association.

== History ==
According to the Xiangtan County Annals, the temple's history stretches back to the Yuan dynasty (1271–1368), founded by Shi Puzhong (释璞忠). It was rebuilt by Shi Zongyuan (释宗源) during the late Ming dynasty (1368–1644). At that time, there are two branch temples under its administration, namely Daofeng Temple (道凤庵) and Juelin Temple (觉林寺).

After the establishment of the Republic of China in 1912, a Buddhist school was set up in the temple. In 1917, it became the Haihui School (海会小学). The temple was restored by Shi Lingwu (释灵悟) in the 1930s. Shi Jing'an, the Venerable Master of the Buddhist Association of the Republic of China, once lived here.

After the founding of the Communist State, in 1952, due to no freedom of religious belief in China, two Buddhist nuns, Shi Liancang (释莲藏) and Shi Shaozong (释绍宗), forced to use the temple for producting cotton fabrics. In 1962, it was designated as a provincial cultural relic preservation organ by the Hunan government. During the ten-year Cultural Revolution, it was devastated by the Red Guards. After the 3rd plenary session of the 11th Central Committee of the Chinese Communist Party, according to a policy of some religious freedom, the temple was refurbished by Shi Shaozong and was officially reopened to the public. In 1995, Hunan government listed it as a "Key Buddhist Temple in Hunan Province".

== Architecture ==
Along the central axis are the Shanmen, Four Heavenly Kings Hall, Mahavira Hall. There are over 10 halls and rooms on both sides, including Guanyin Hall, Buddhist Texts Library, Monastic Dining Hall, Monastic Reception Hall and Meditation Hall.

== Gallery ==
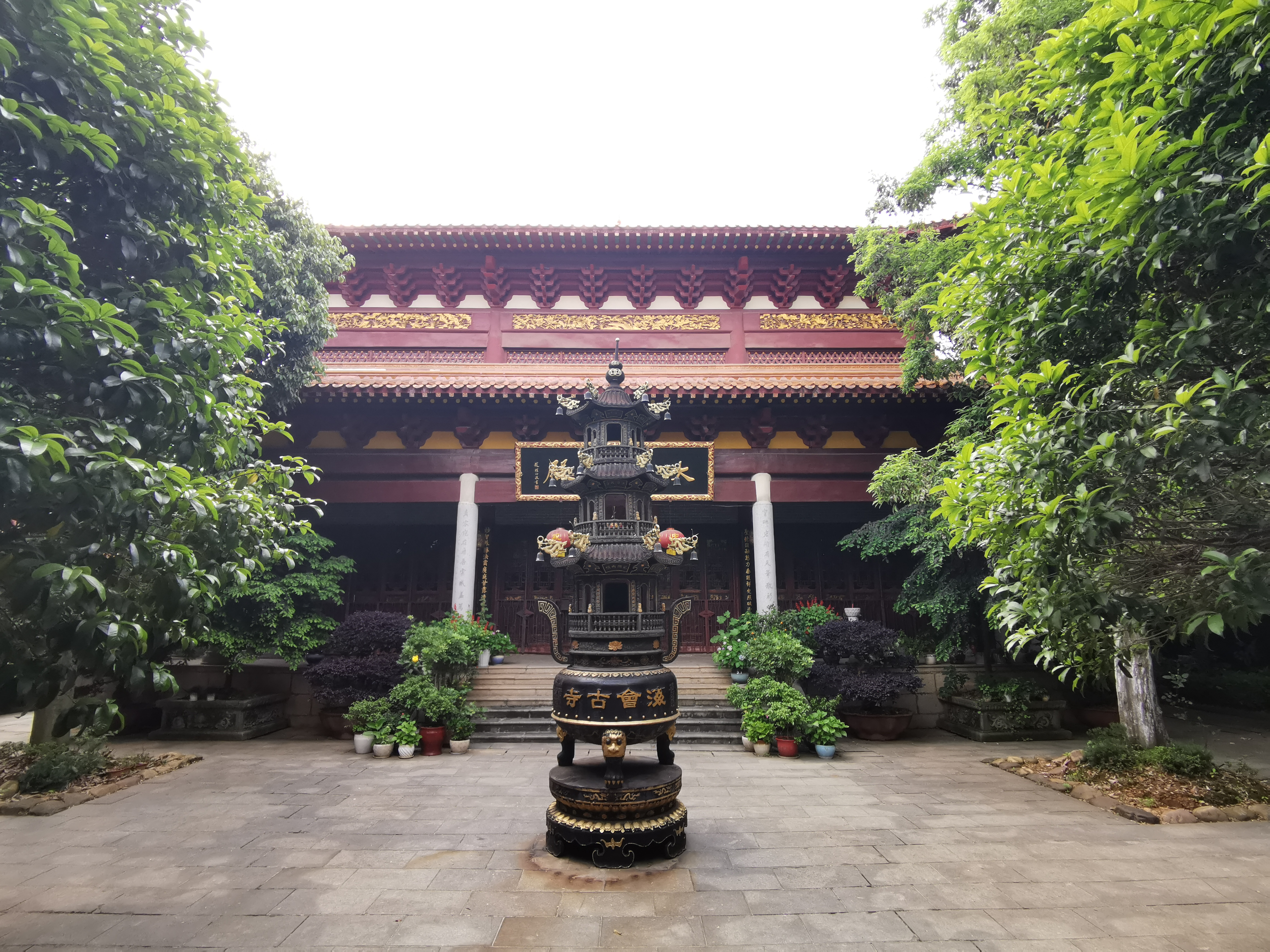
Mahavira Hall

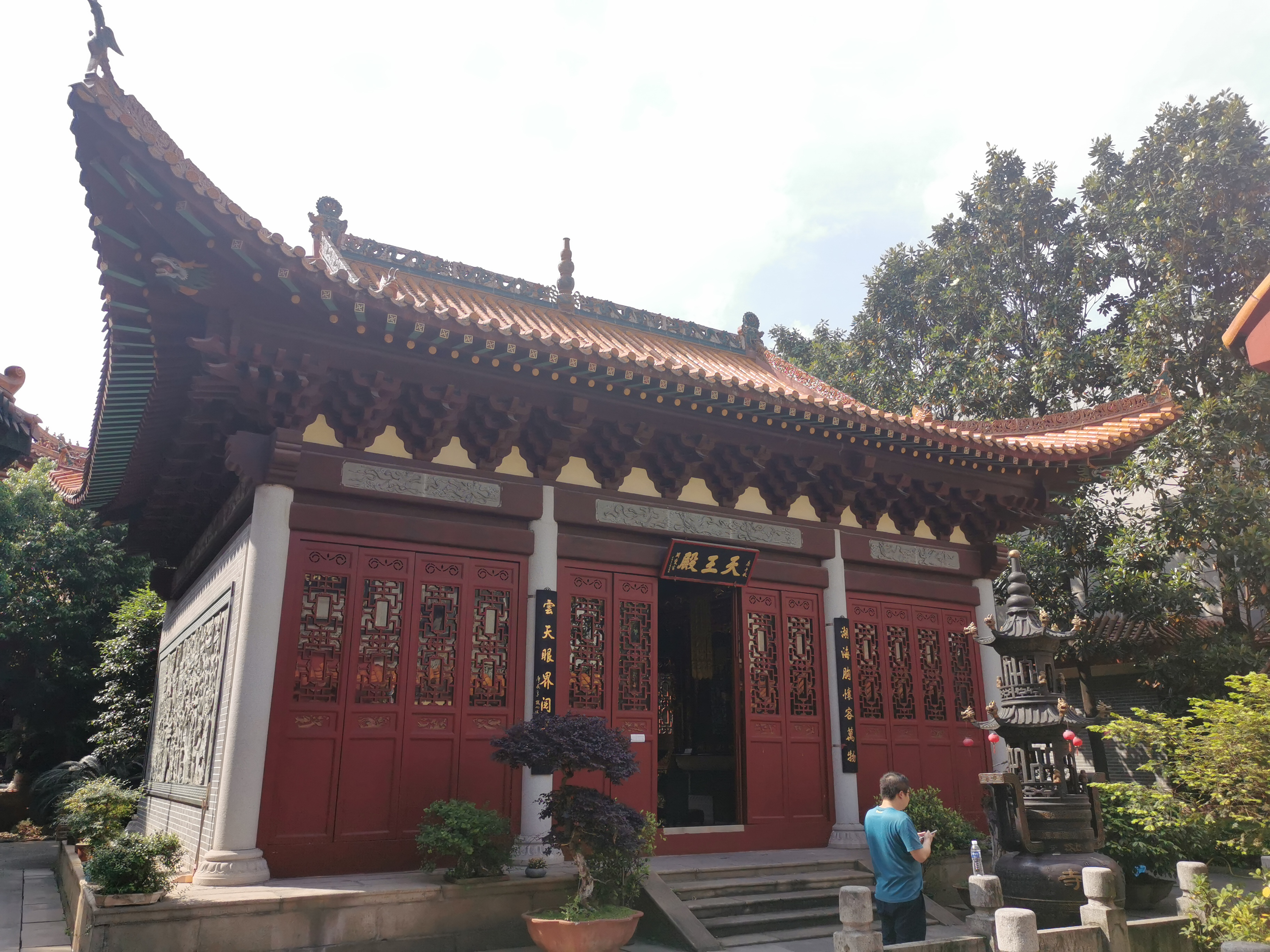
Four Heavenly Kings Hall

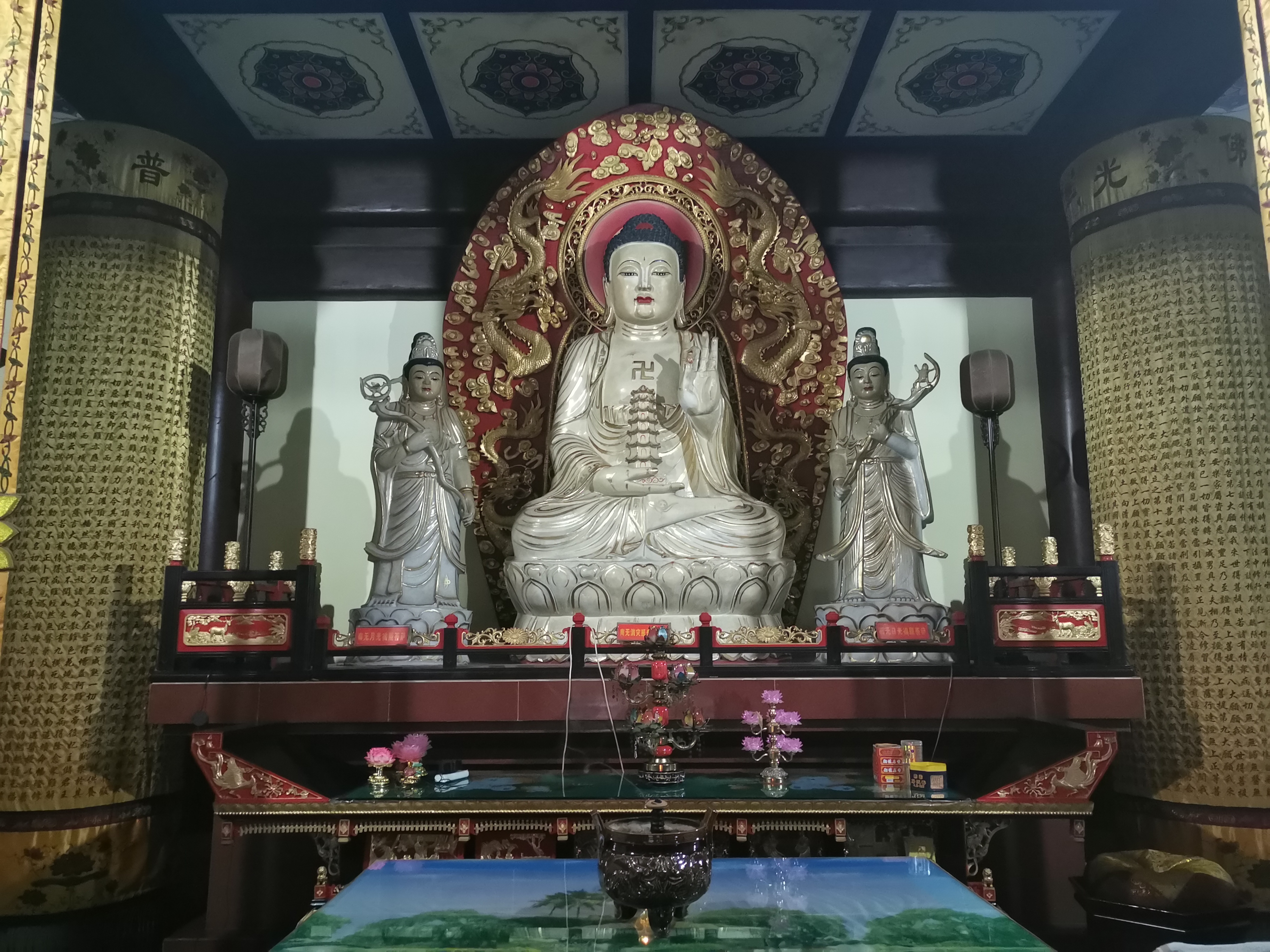
Statues of Bhaisajyaguru (middle), Sūryaprabha and Candraprabha

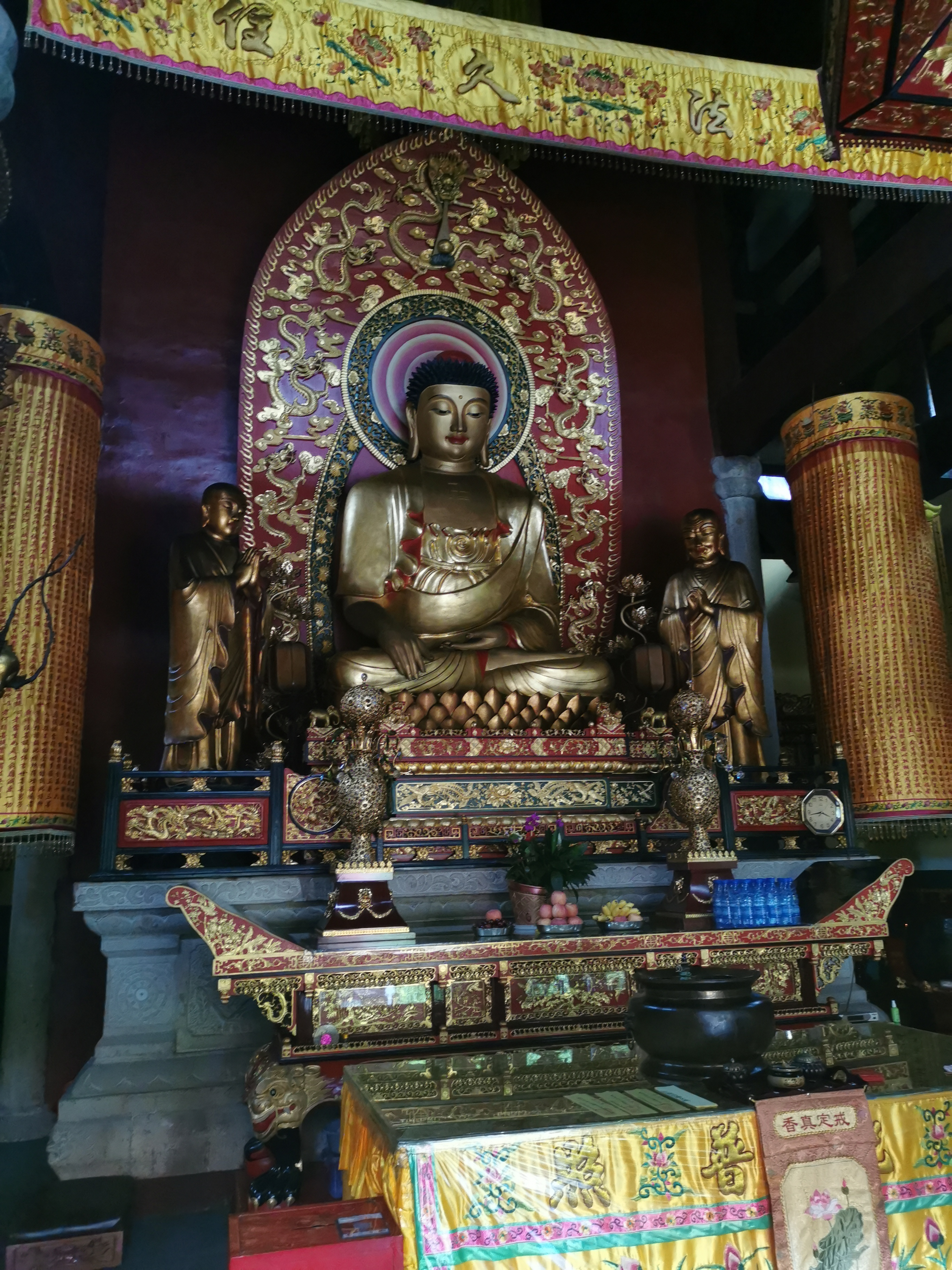
Statues of Sakyamuni, Kashyapa and Anada at the Mahavira Hall

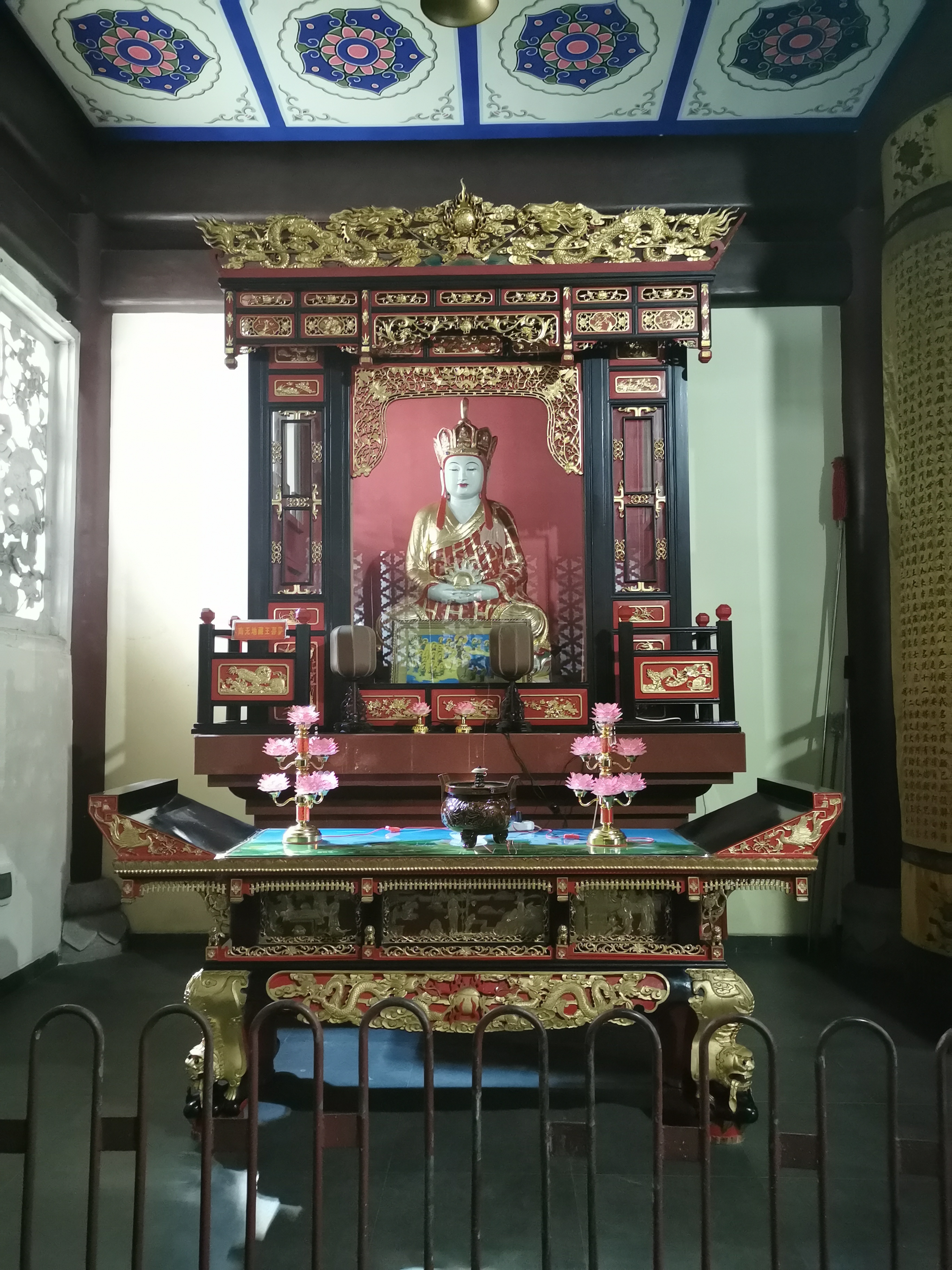
Statue of Kṣitigarbha

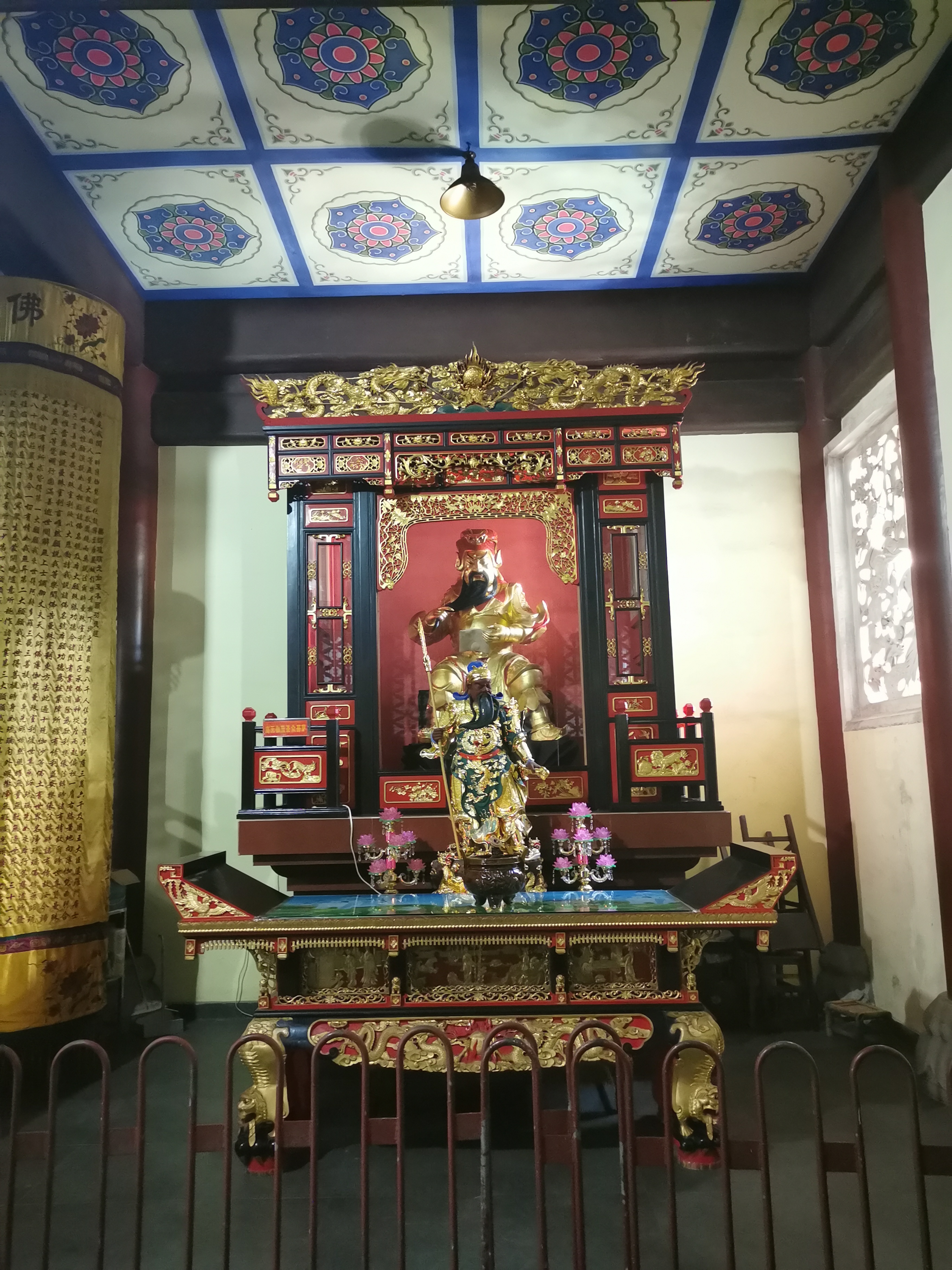
Statue of Guan Yu
