= Hie =

Hie or HIE may refer to:

- Hie (pronoun), an Old English pronoun
- Hie Shrine, a Shinto shrine in Tokyo, Japan
- Hie Station, in Nishiwaki, Hyōgo Prefecture, Japan
- Health information exchange
- Highlands and Islands Enterprise
- Holiday Inn Express
- Hunan Institute of Engineering, in Xiangtan, Hunan, China
- Hypoxic ischaemic encephalopathy
- Kodak High-Speed Infrared (also known as Kodak HIE), an infrared photographic film
- Mount Washington Regional Airport, in New Hampshire, United States
