= 2018 Shanghai stabbings =

Chinese criminal incident

2018 Shanghai knife attack
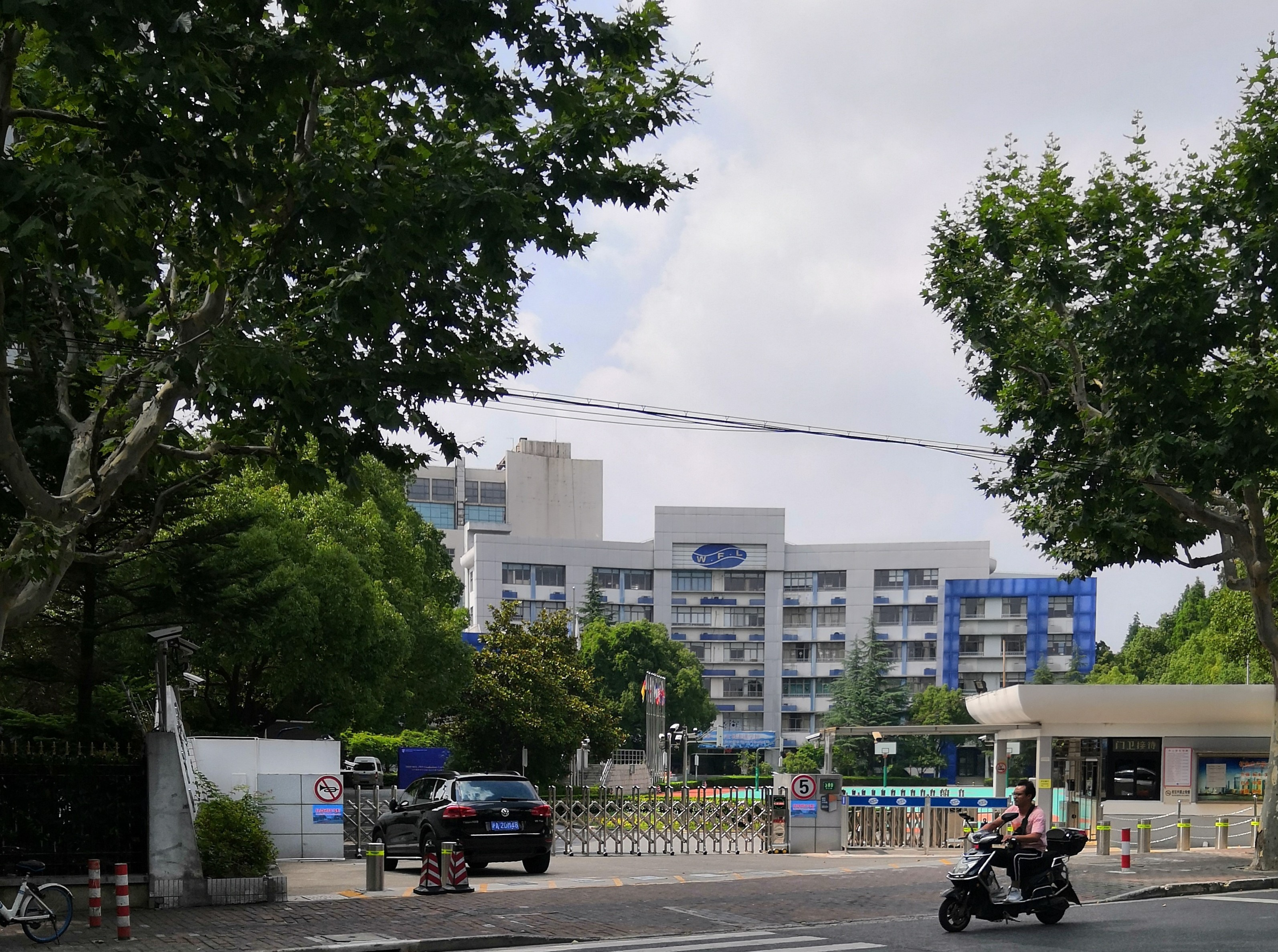
- Shanghai World Foreign Language Primary School, East Campus
- Native name: 6·28 浦北路持刀杀人案
- Location: 31°9′21.17″N 121°24′55.51″E; Pubei Road, Kangjian New Village Subdistrict, Xuhui District, Shanghai, China
- Date: 28 June 2018 c. 11:30 a.m. (UTC+8)
- Target: Students and their parents at Elementary school
- Attack type: Mass stabbing, knife attack, school attack
- Weapon: Kitchen knife
- Deaths: 2
- Injuries: 2
- Perpetrator: Huang Yichuan
- Motive: Misanthropy and/or mental illness

On 28 June 2018, in the Xuhui District of Shanghai, China, four people were stabbed with a knife near the gate of the West Campus of the Shanghai World Foreign Language Primary School. (Note: The school's two campuses are both in Kangjian New Village Subdistrict, Xuhui District. They are not far from each other; the east campus is on Pubei Road, and the west campus is on Guilin West Road. The victims were students at the east campus, but the murders took place closer to the west campus.) Two male students were killed while a third schoolboy and a student's mother were injured. The following day, the Supreme People's Procuratorate announced the arrest of the perpetrator, 29-year-old Huang Yichuan (Chinese: 黃一川), at the scene.

On 6 December 2018, the first trial of the case was held. The perpetrator gave the motive for the murders as his hopelessness for life and his desire for revenge on society. The prosecutor pointed out that Huang Yichuan had schizophrenia. On 23 May 2019, The First Intermediate People's Court of Shanghai decided that Huang's mental illness did not affect his ability to control his own behavior. The court then imposed the death penalty, as well as depriving his political rights for life. On 30 December 2019, the Shanghai Senior People's Court rejected the appeal on Huang Yichuan's ruling, upheld the original judgment, and submitted it to the Supreme People's Court for approval. On 3 December 2020, Huang Yichuan was executed.

== Incident ==
The attack occurred shortly before 11:30 a.m., approximately 130 meters from the West Campus gate entrance of Shanghai World Foreign Language Primary School. At 11:31 a.m., the Xuhui Branch of Shanghai Municipal Public Security Bureau received a phone call, reporting that a man with a kitchen knife had cut three boys and a woman near the sidewalk of Guilin West Street on Pubei Road. School security guards and bystanders restrained the assailant, Huang Yichuan, and rendered aid to the injured. By noon on June 28, two of the boys had died. At 1:50 p.m., the Xuhui police issued a call for information.

According to a video uploaded online, the two boys fell to the ground after being stabbed. There was a lot of blood at the scene, and some people used towels to stop the children's bleeding. A kitchen knife was also seen on the ground. A number of people at the scene, including the staff of city management, held Huang Yichuan down to prevent his escape, and a passing air conditioner repairman tied him up with a rope. After the police arrived, Huang was arrested and offered no resistance during the entire process.

== Victims ==
One of the students, identified by his surname Tan, was confirmed to have died from injury to the central nervous system and hemorrhagic shock. The other student who died, with the surname Fei, died of a brain injury and hemorrhagic shock, due to the stab wounds to his head, face, and left palm. The third student, Jin, and the parent, Zhang, only suffered minor head injuries.

== Perpetrator ==
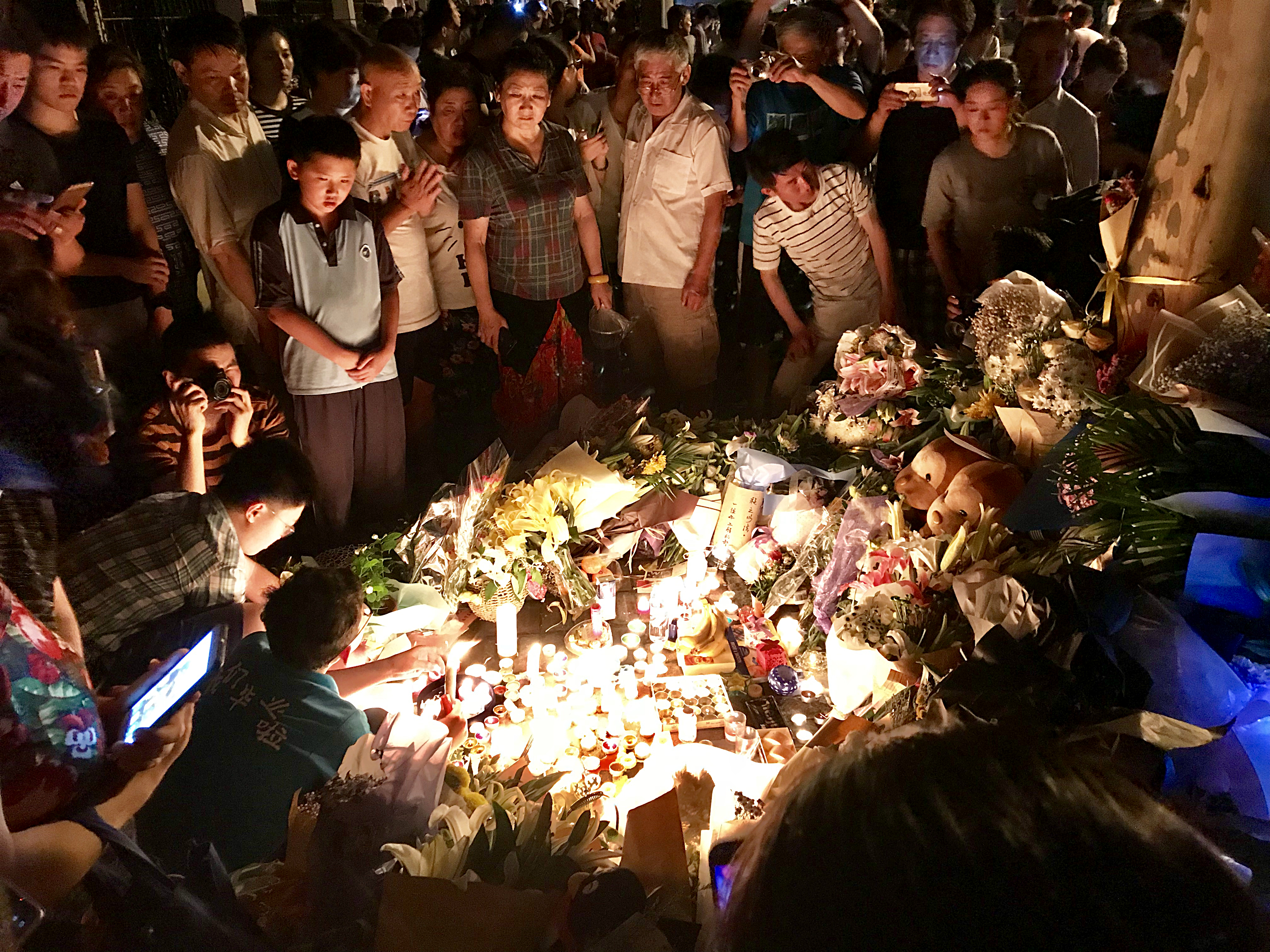
Locals mourning after the attack.

According to an examination of the First Branch of Shanghai People's Procuratorate, Huang Yichuan was unemployed at the time of the attack. He claimed that after a failure to find employment in many places, he went to Shanghai in early June 2018. After arriving, Huang came up with the idea to take revenge on society through murder. On the morning of 28 June, he set out from his hotel with a stainless-steel kitchen knife and took a bus to Guilin West Street near the World Foreign Language Primary School. At about 11 a.m., he saw three students and a parent leaving the school. To avoid the security patrol at the school gate, he followed the group and stabbed them about 130 meters away from the school gate.

After the incident, his personal information was exposed through human flesh search engine. According to a screenshot of Huang Yichuan's basic personal information that circulated on the Internet, he was born on 3 June 1989, in Shaoyang, Hunan, and had been a student in the school of architecture of Hunan University of Science and Technology (HUST). Some students at HUST confirmed that Huang Yichuan had previously studied with them at HUST. They also mentioned that he had antisocial tendencies when he was a university student. When Huang graduated from the college, he left many threatening messages on Tencent QQ to many students. During the six years after his graduation, he participated in the Master's Program Admissions Examination many times but always failed. In addition, during those years he had changed jobs more than ten times.

According to a survey conducted by Caixin Online, Huang Yichuan's parents divorced when he was a child. His childhood home was in a building designed for the family of local civil servants in Suining County. Additionally, his grandmother, Wu, was found to have had schizophrenia for decades. In 2012 and 2013, Huang Yichuan failed the Postgraduate Admission Test twice and repeatedly failed to find a job, but he still hid the truth from his family and friends, claiming that he had a high income and perfect life. During the 2018 Spring Festival, Huang's mother thought that her son was more withdrawn and irritable, and some distant relatives thought that he may have inherited his grandmother's schizophrenia. In the year before the murders, Huang Yichuan traveled to Xiamen, Wuhan, Guangzhou, Shanghai, and other cities, where he visited many kindergartens and primary schools, planning to commit the murders. A month before the Pubei murders, Huang Yichuan took the train from Guangzhou to Shanghai, spending most of his time at a youth hostel in the Pudong New Area. A few days before the incident, he heard on the radio that the Shanghai World Foreign Language Primary School was going to hold a graduation ceremony, so he decided to murder students from that school.

== Criminal proceedings ==
Trial of Huang Yichuan
- Court: The First Intermediate People's Court of Shanghai
- Started: 6 December 2018
- Decided: 23 May 2019

Case history
- Appealed to: Shanghai Senior People's Court
- Subsequent actions: Appeal opened on 30 August 2019 and rejected on 30 December 2019

Case opinions
- Sentence award for intentional homicide; Death, as well as deprivation of political rights for life

On 28 June 2018, the first branch of the Shanghai Municipal People's Procuratorate and the Xuhui District procuratorate appointed prosecutors to intervene in the case to guide the investigation and evidence collection. On 29 June the Xuhui District Procuratorate approved the arrest according to the law. On 14 August the first branch of the Shanghai Municipal People's Procuratorate initiated a public prosecution against Huang Yichuan for intentional murder to the First Intermediate People's Court of Shanghai. On 6 December, the case was heard in a court session of the First Intermediate People's Court of Shanghai, attended by representatives of the National People's Congress, representatives of the Shanghai Municipal People's Congress, the victims' families, and more than 50 other people. After the judicial identification, Huang Yichuan was diagnosed with schizophrenia, and as a result, held limited criminal responsibility. During the trial, the procuratorate recommended the court to punish him according to the provisions of the third paragraph of Article 18 of the Criminal Law of the People's Republic of China. (Note: Criminal Law of the People's Republic of China, article 18, paragraph 3: "A mentally ill person who commits a crime at a time when he has not yet completely lost his ability to recognize or control his own conduct shall bear criminal responsibility but he may be given a lesser or a mitigated punishment.") However, the court also considered that his motive for killing was particularly sinister, the crime had been planned for a long time, and the killing method was particularly brutal.

At 10:00 a.m. on 23 May 2019, the First Intermediate People's Court of Shanghai issued the first judgment on the case. The defendant Huang Yichuan was sentenced to death for intentional homicide, and he was sentenced to be deprived of political rights for life. In the judgment, the First Intermediate People's Court of Shanghai pointed out that Huang Yichuan decided to kill primary school students in order to vent his anger because he "thought he was being bullied and hurt by others." He had premeditated and prepared serious violence against innocent children, with despicable motives and cruel means. Although Huang Yichuan has schizophrenia and, therefore, had limited criminal responsibility, his crime was extremely serious, and the court decided that his mental illness did not affect his ability to control his behavior in this case. After the sentence, the defendant did not appeal in court. According to a reporter, the sentencing on the morning of May 23 lasted only about half an hour, and the defendant appeared very calm.

Later, Huang formally made an appeal. On 30 August 2019, the second instance of the case opened for trial. In the second trial, Huang Yichuan argued that he did not plan to kill people in advance, and that he was committing homicide in a state of insanity. However, the procuratorial organ believed that the facts of Huang Yichuan's homicide were clear, the applicable law was correct, and the trial procedure was legal, meaning that his sentence was appropriate. Therefore, it was suggested that the court of second instance should reject the appeal and maintain its original judgment. At 12 a.m. of that day, the trial of second instance came to a close. On 30 December 2019, the Shanghai Senior People's Court held a court session to make a public judgment on the appeal case, and they ruled to reject the appeal and uphold the original judgment that Huang Yichuan was sentenced to death and deprived of his political rights for life. On 3 December 2020, Huang Yichuan was executed.
