= Xiangtan Institute of Technology =

Private university in Hunan, China

Xiangtan Institute of Science and Technology
- 湘潭理工学院
- Former names: Beijin College of Hunan University of Technology and Business
- Type: Private undergraduate
- Established: 2001
- Chairman: Li Shufu (李书福)
- President: Yuan Libin (袁礼斌)
- Students: 12,000 (November 2025)
- Location: Xiangtan, China; 27°53′02″N 112°51′57″E
- Campus: 1,200 acres (490 ha)
- Website: https://en.xtit.edu.cn/

The Xiangtan Institute of Technology (XIT, Chinese: 湘潭理工学院; pinyin: Xiāngtán lǐgōng xuéyuàn; lit. 'Xiangtan Institute of Science and Technology') is a private non-profit college located in the Jiuhua Economic & Development Zone of Xiangtan, Hunan, China. It is the first undergraduate university in Hunan Province to transition from an affiliated collage to a private university with the approval of the Ministry of Education.

The college offers seven disciplines: science, engineering, economics, management, law, literature, and art, constituting a total of 38 undergraduate majors in total.

== History ==
Originally the Beijin College of Hunan University of Technology and Business (湖南工商大学北津学院), the college was founded on the banks of the Xiangjiang River in 2001 as a joint effort by Hunan University and the Zhejiang Geely Holding Group Corporation. The college was located within the site of the Han–era Beijin City, west of Changsha.

in June 2020, the university was approved by the Ministry of Education to become an independent, nonprofit private university under the new name Xiangtan Institute of Technology.

== Academics ==
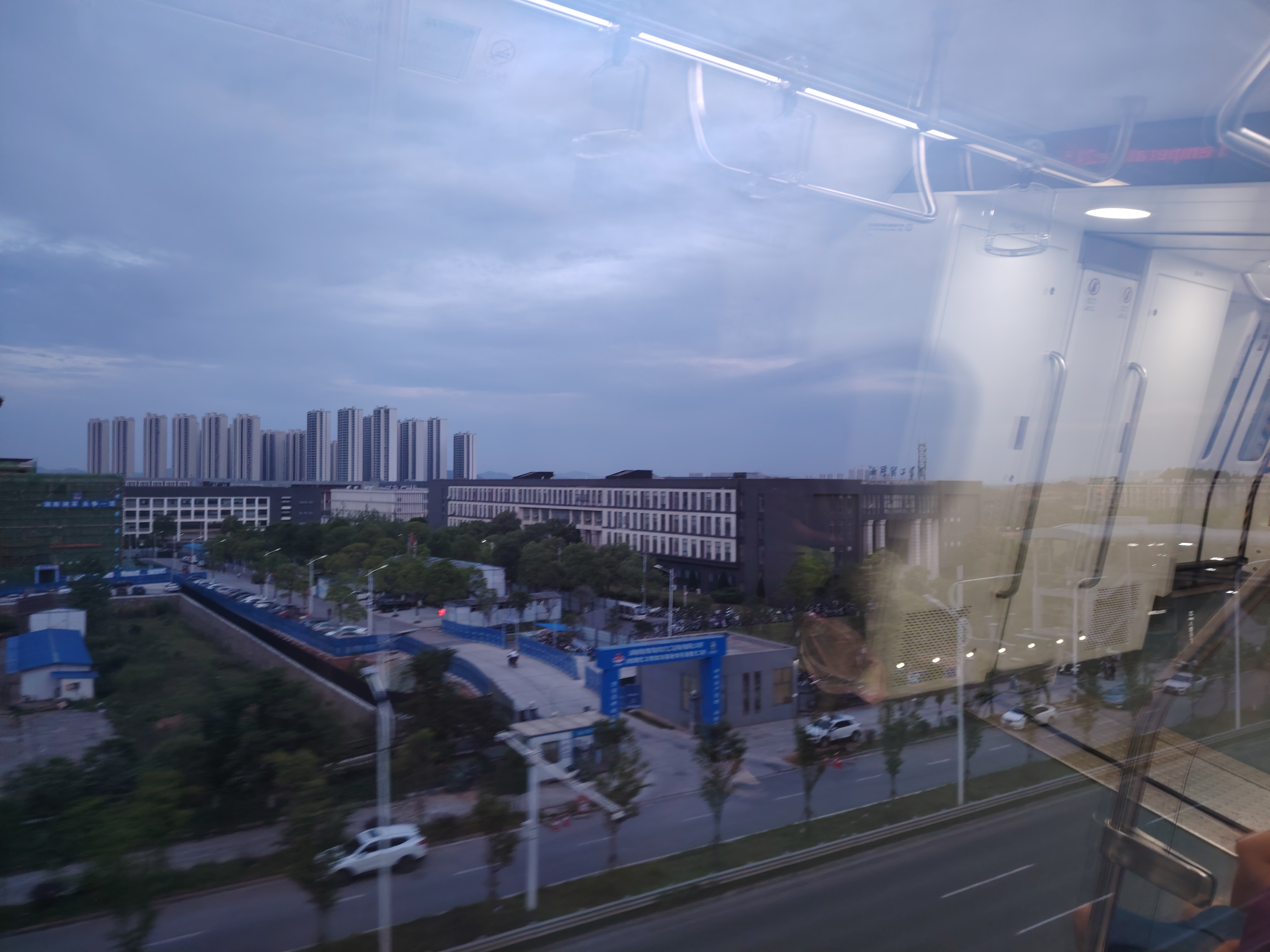
Xiangtan Institute of Technology campus

Xiangtan Institute of Technology consists of the School of Humanities and Arts, School of Business, School of Chinese Languages, School of Digital Technology, School of Automotive Engineering, School of Marxism, Ministry of Public Sports, and Tanzhou College

As part of its partnership with the Geely group, Xiangtan Institute of Technology hosts a joint Postdoctoral Research Workstation under the Ministry of Human Resources and Social Security, allowing postdoctoral researchers and students at the university to collaborate directly with the company.
