= Xiangtan High-Tech Industrial Development Zone =

Xiangtan High-Tech Industrial Development Zone 湘潭高新技术产业开发区
- High-Tech Industrial Zone
- Location in Hunan
- Coordinates: 27°49′44″N 112°56′48″E
- Country: People's Republic of China
- Province: Hunan
- Prefecture-level city: Xiangtan

Area
  - Total: 46.79 km^{2} (18.07 sq mi)
- Time zone: UTC+08:00 (China Standard)
- Area code: 0731
- Website: xthtz.xiangtan.gov.cn

Chinese name
- Traditional Chinese: 湘潭高新技術產業開發區
- Simplified Chinese: 湘潭高新技术产业开发区
Transcriptions
Standard Mandarin
- Hanyu Pinyin: Xiāngtán Gāoxīn Jìshù Chǎnyè Kāifāqū

Xiangtan High-Tech Industrial Development Zone (Chinese: 湘潭高新技术产业开发区; abbr: XTHTZ) is a national high-tech industrial zone in Xiangtan, Hunan, China. It covers an area of 46.79-square-kilometre (18.07 sq mi).

== History ==
Xiangtan High-Tech Industrial Development Zone was first established in 1992. It was upgraded to a national HTZs approved by the State Council of China on March 18, 2009. On October 31, 2014, Xiangtan High-Tech Industrial Development Zone signed an industry university research cooperation agreement with Hunan University.
