= Yuhu, Xiangtan =

Yuhu 雨湖区
- District
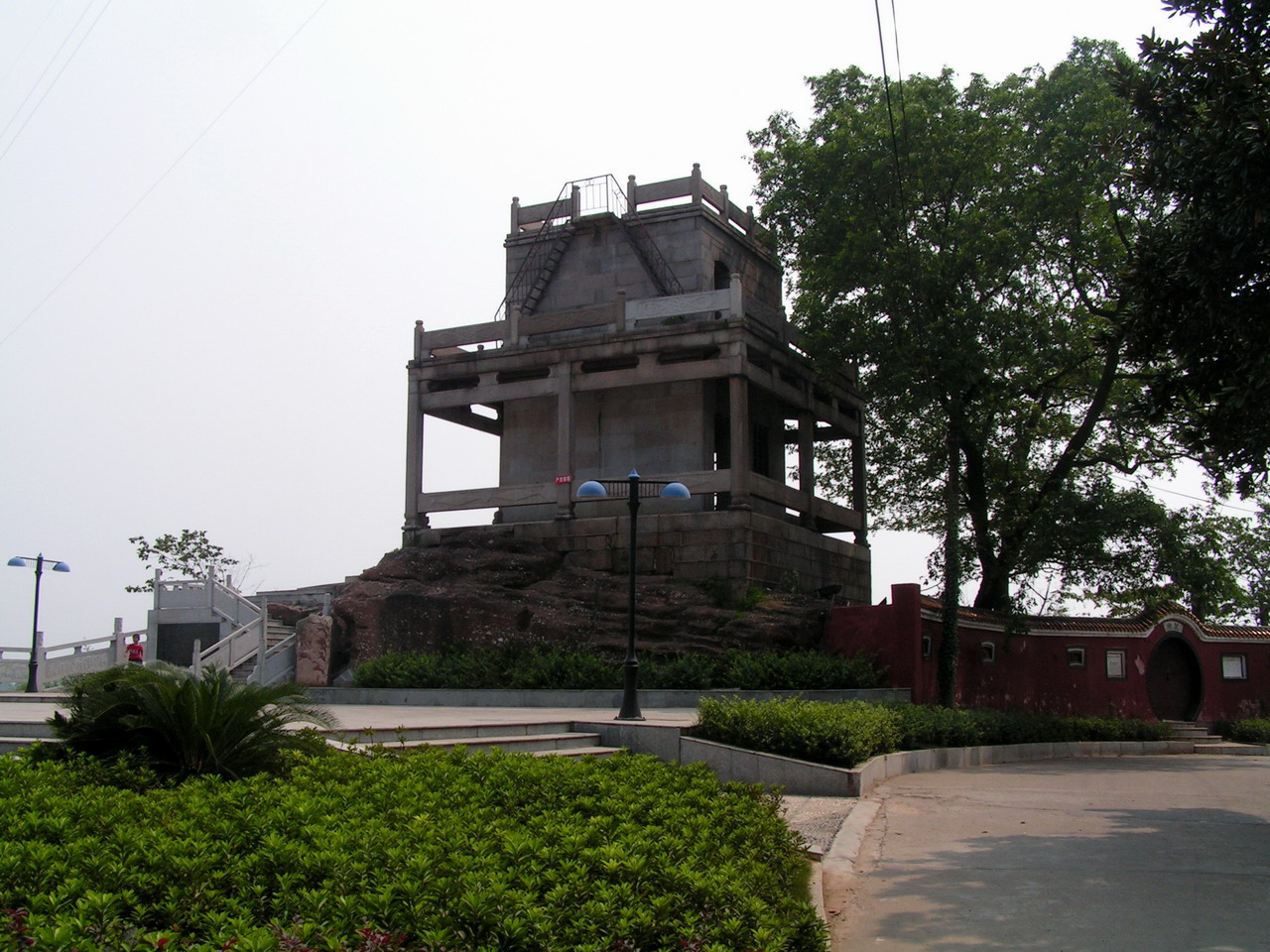
- Wangheng Pavilion

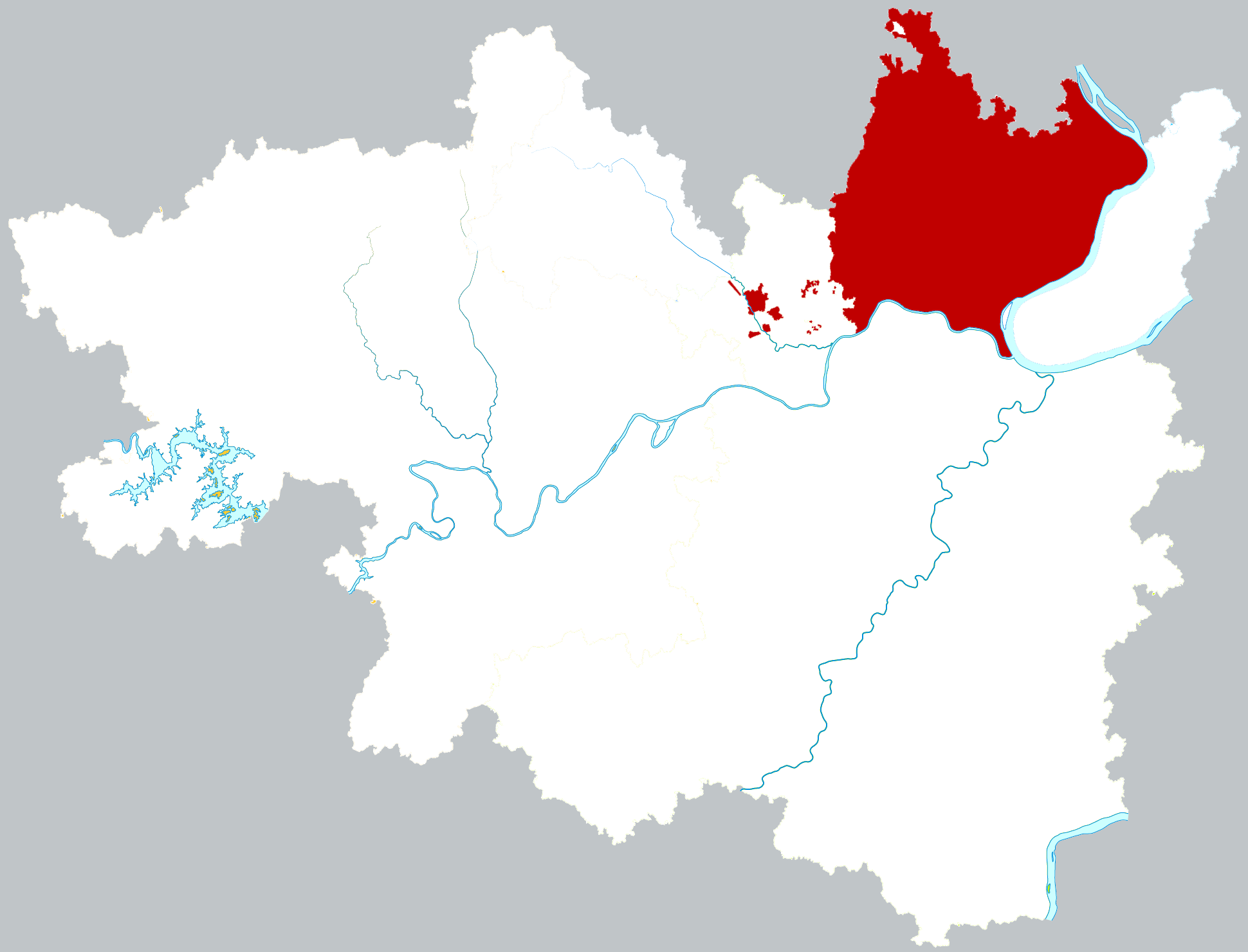
- Location of Yuhu District within Xiangtan

- Location in Hunan
- Coordinates: 27°51′23″N 112°54′27″E
- Country: People's Republic of China
- Province: Hunan
- Prefecture-level city: Xiangtan

Area
  - Total: 451.39 km^{2} (174.28 sq mi)

Population (2015)
  - Total: 667,000
  - Density: 1,480/km^{2} (3,830/sq mi)
- Time zone: UTC+8 (China Standard)

Yuhu District (simplified Chinese: 雨湖区; traditional Chinese: 雨湖區; pinyin: Yǔhú Qū; lit. 'rain lake') is one of two urban districts in Xiangtan City, Hunan Province, China. Located in the western region of the city proper and on the northwestern shoreside of the Xiang River, the district is bordered to the north by Yuelu District of Changsha City, to the east by Tianxin District of Changsha City and Yuetang District, to the south by Xiangtan County, and to the west by Ningxiang County. Yuhu District covers an area of 451.39 km^{2} (174.28 sq mi), and as of 2015, it had a registered population of 520,477 and a residential population of 667,000. The district has 8 subdistricts, 3 towns and 1 township under its jurisdiction, and the government seat is located in Yuhu Road Subdistrict.

== Administrative divisions ==
As of 2020, Yuhu District administers 8 subdistricts, 3 towns, and 1 township.

=== Subdistricts ===
The district's 8 subdistricts are Yuhu Road Subdistrict, Chengzheng Street Subdistrict, Yuntang Subdistrict, Guangchang Subdistrict, Yaowan Subdistrict, Zhaotan Subdistrict, Wanlou Subdistrict, and Xianfeng Subdistrict.

=== Towns ===
The district's 3 towns are Heling, Nanzhushan, and Jiangshe.

=== Township ===
The district's sole township is Changcheng Township.

== Tourist attractions ==
Wan Pavilion is a well known tourist spot in the district, which provides the best view of Xiang River in Xiangtan.
