= Xiangtan =

Xiangtan 湘潭市 Siangtan; Hsiangtan
- Prefecture-level city
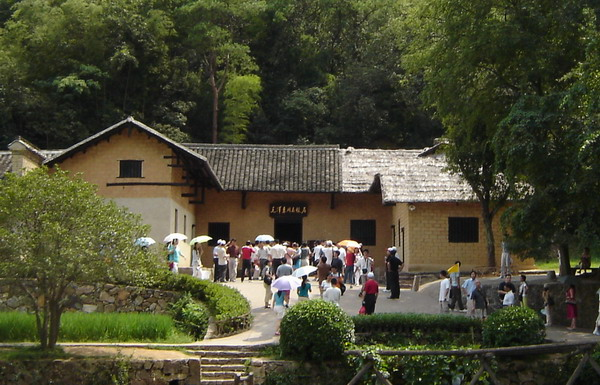
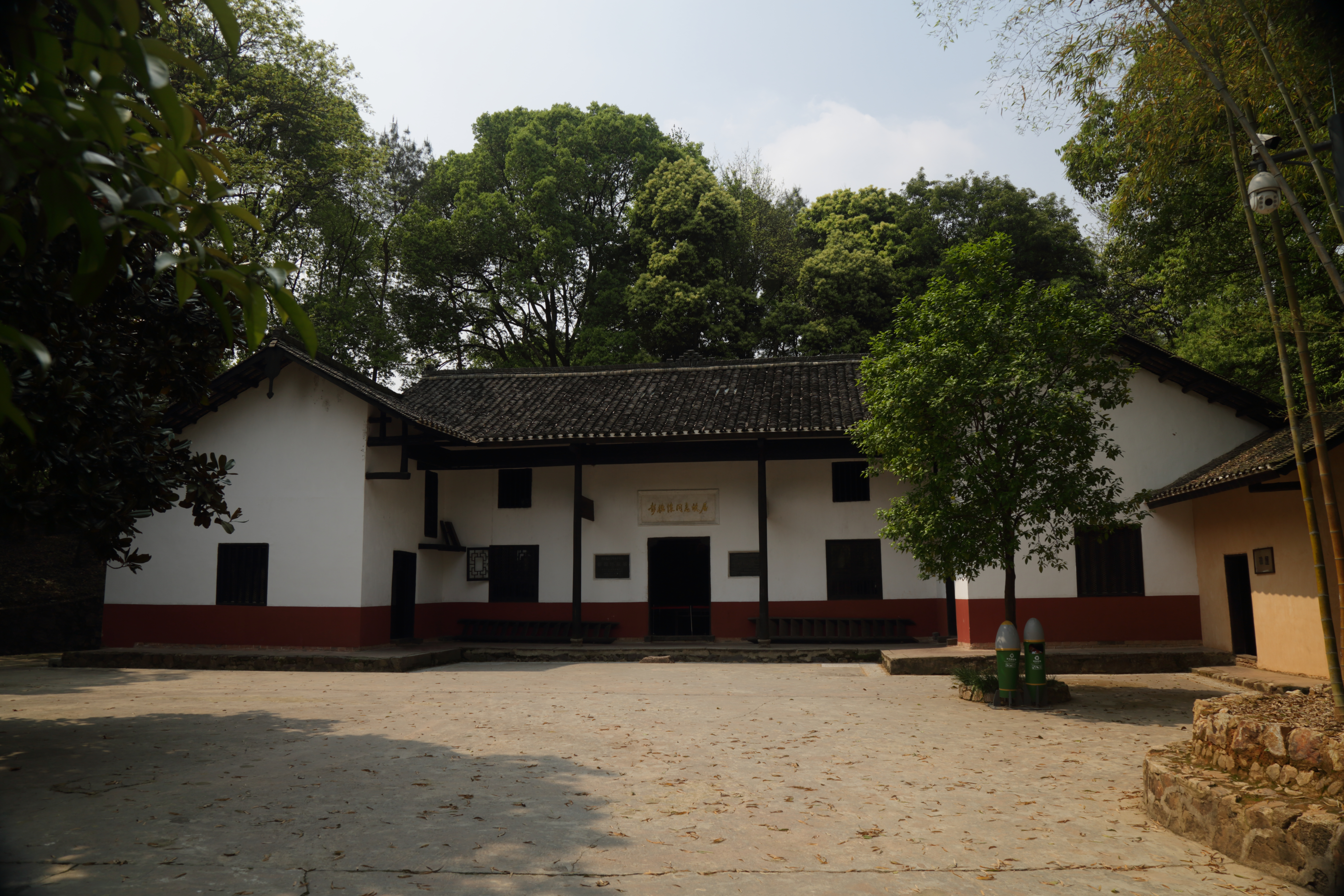
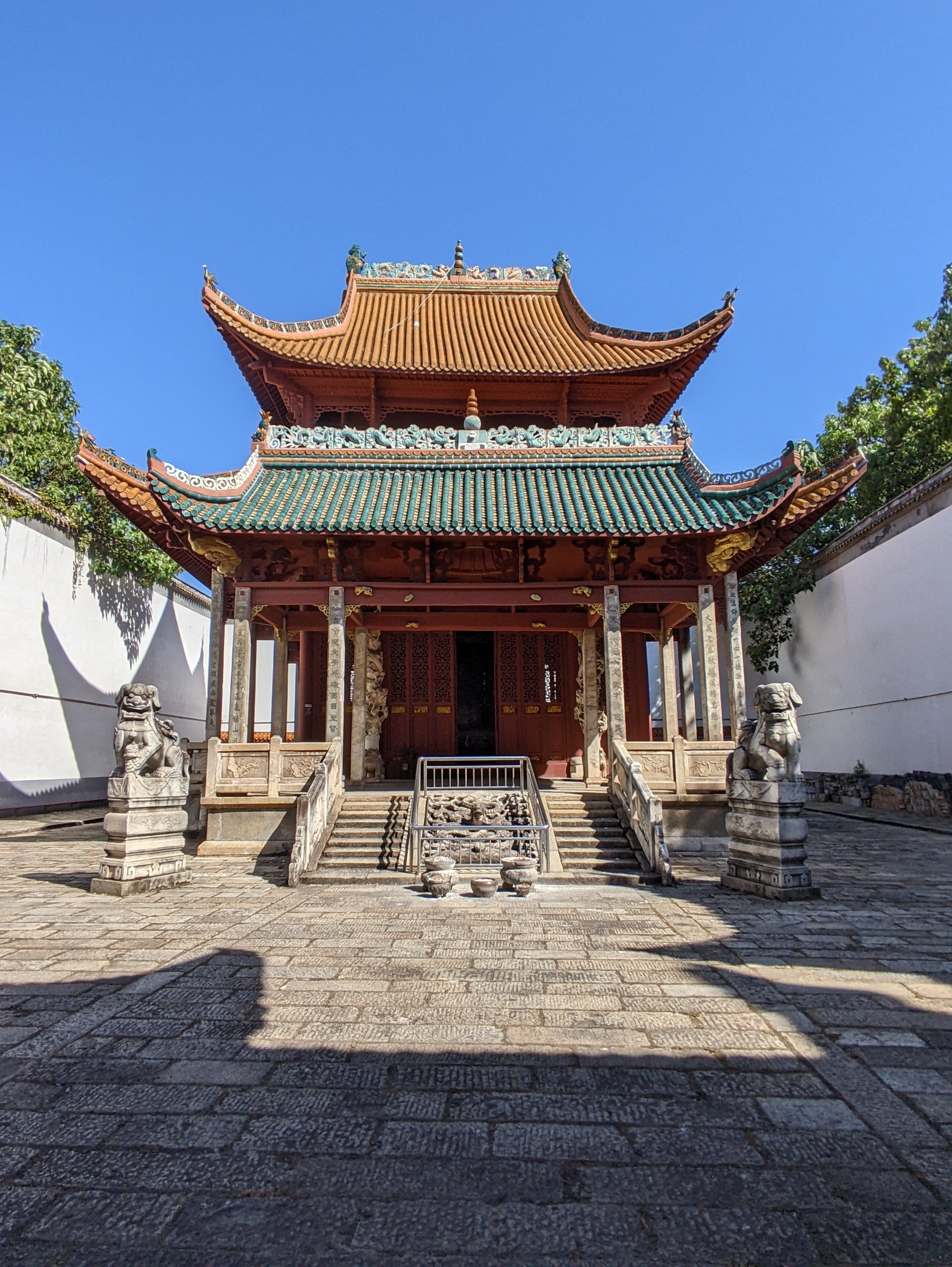
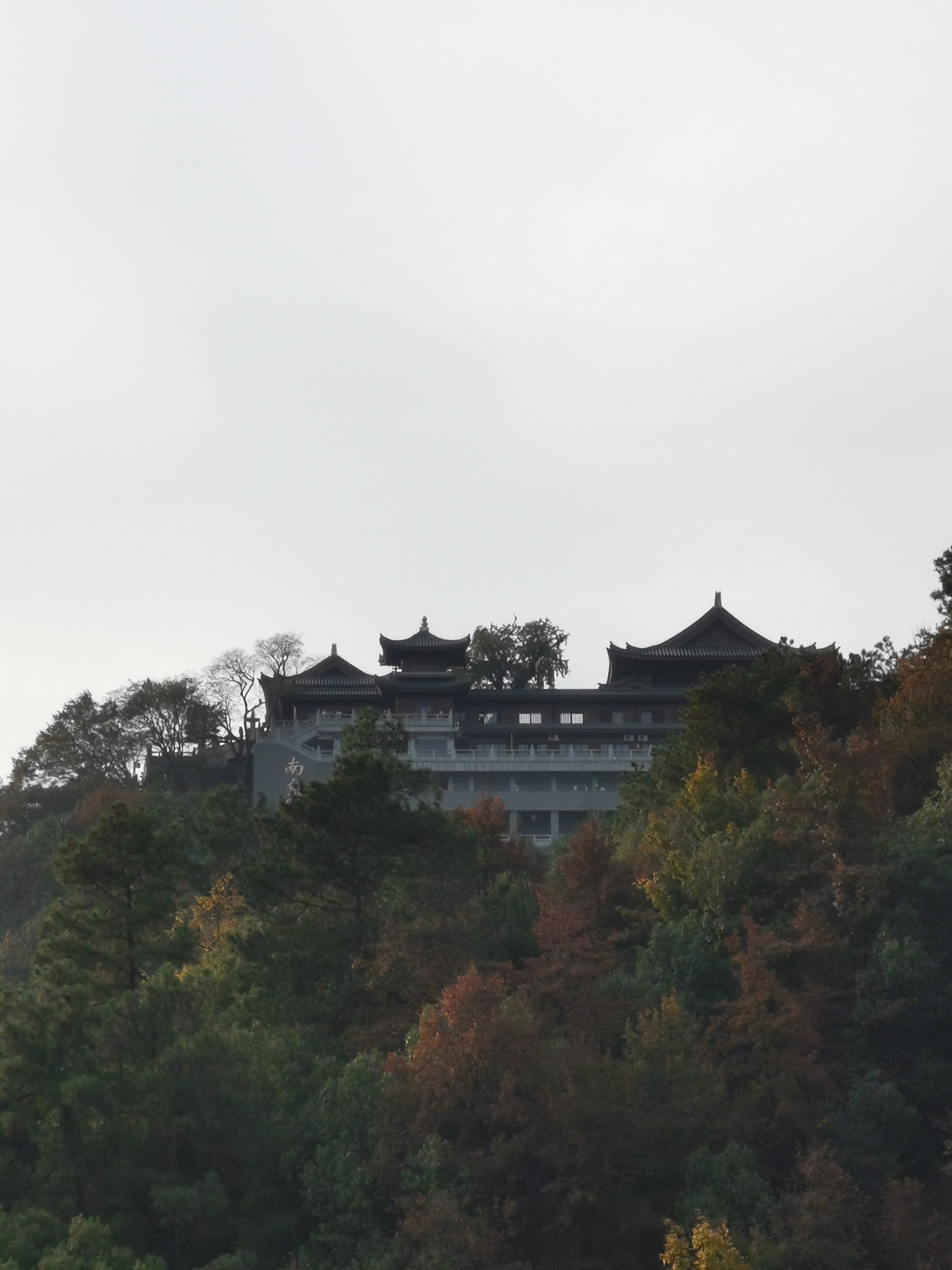
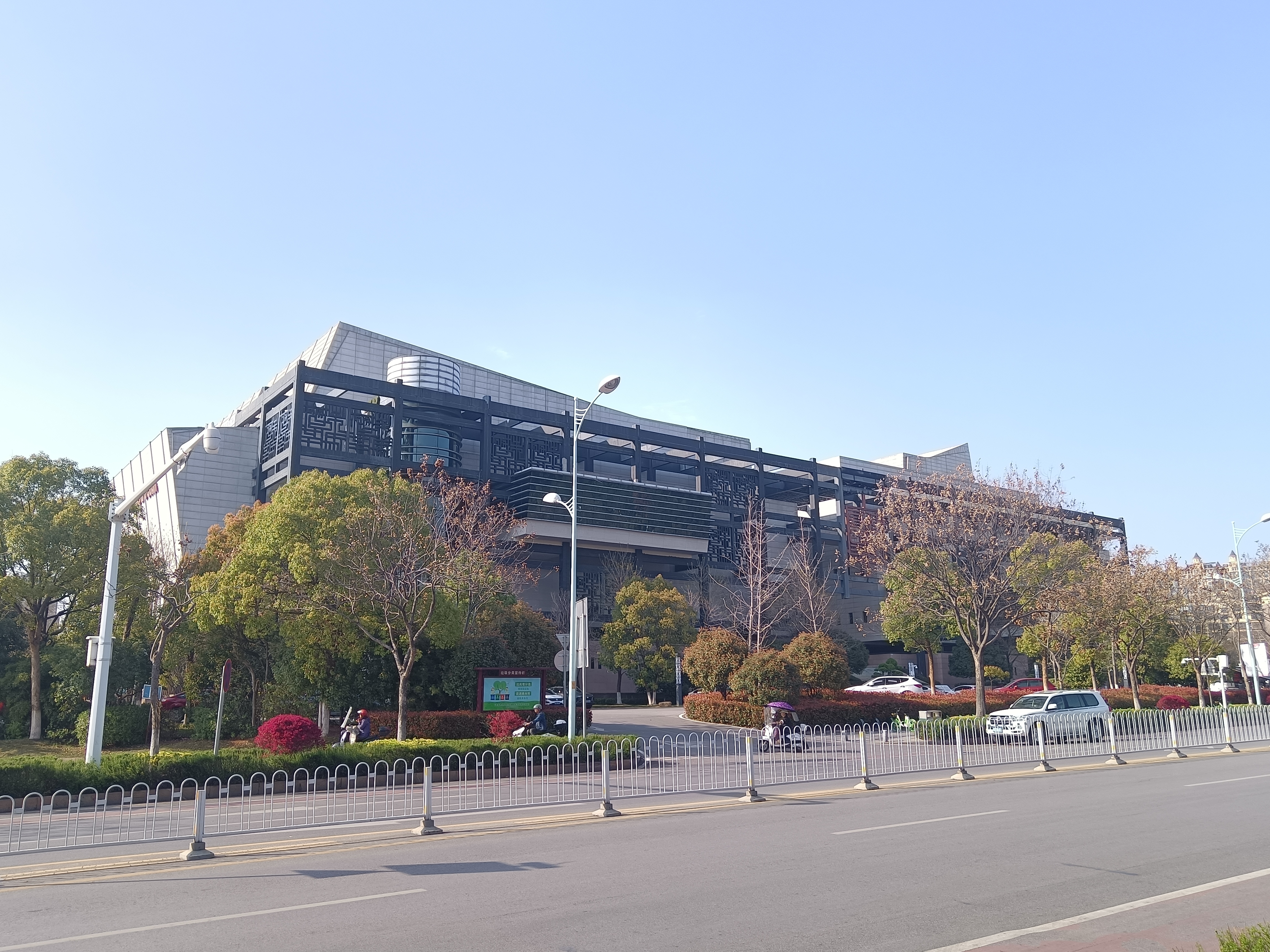
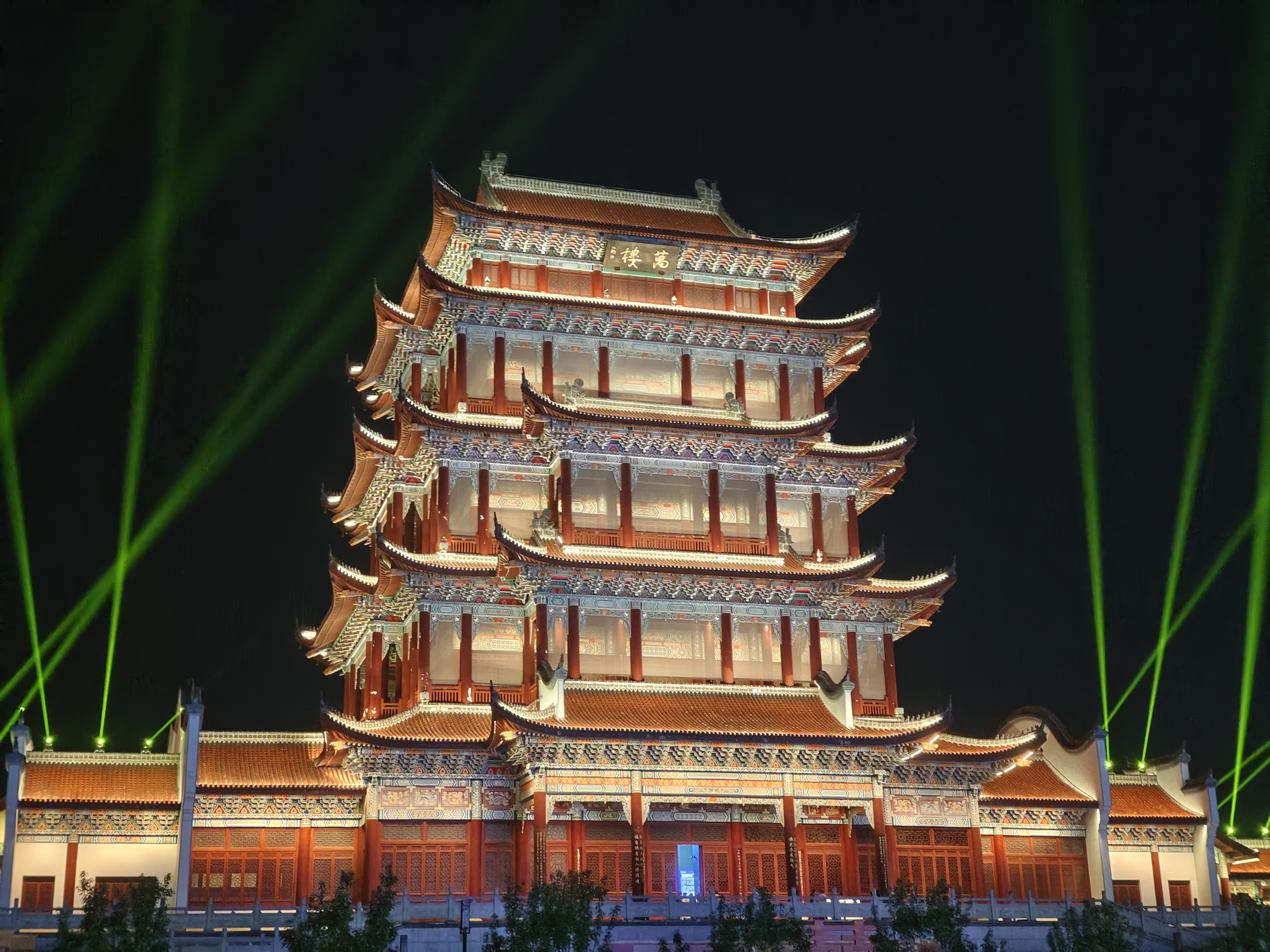
- Former Residence of Mao Zedong Former Residence of Peng Dehuai North Five Provinces Huiguan Mount Zhao Xiangtan Museum Wan Pavilion

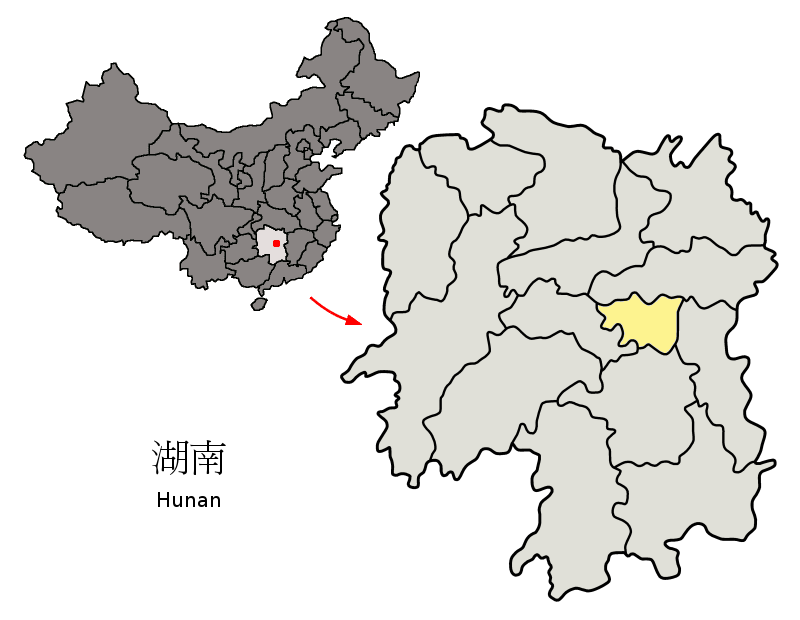
- Location of Xiangtan Prefecture within Hunan Province.

- Location of the city centre in Hunan
- Coordinates (Xiangtan municipal government): 27°49′53″N 112°56′43″E
- Country: People's Republic of China
- Province: Hunan
- Municipal seat: Yuetang District

Government
  - Mayor: Zhang Yingchun (张迎春)
  - Party Secretary: Cao Jiongfang (曹炯芳)

Area
  - Prefecture-level city: 5,006 km^{2} (1,933 sq mi)
  - Urban (2017): 169.02 km^{2} (65.26 sq mi)
  - Districts: 657.7 km^{2} (253.9 sq mi)

Population (2010 census)
  - Prefecture-level city: 2,752,171
  - Density: 549.8/km^{2} (1,424/sq mi)
  - Urban (2017): 817,600
  - Urban density: 4,837/km^{2} (12,530/sq mi)
  - Districts: 915,000

GDP
  - Prefecture-level city: CN¥ 269.8 billion US$ 40.0 billion
  - Per capita: CN¥ 98,947; US$ 14,713
- Time zone: UTC+8 (China Standard)
- ISO 3166 code: CN-HN-03
- Website: www.xiangtan.gov.cn

Xiangtan
- Chinese: 湘潭
Transcriptions
Standard Mandarin
- Hanyu Pinyin: Xiāngtán
- Wade–Giles: Hsiang^{1}-tan^{2}
- IPA: [ɕjáŋtʰǎn]

Xiangtan (Chinese: 湘潭) is a prefecture-level city in east-central Hunan province, south-central China. The hometowns of several founding leaders of the Chinese Communist Party, including Chairman Mao Zedong, President Liu Shaoqi, and Marshal Peng Dehuai, are in Xiangtan's administration, as well as the hometowns of Qing dynasty and republic era painter Qi Baishi, Confucian scholar-general Zeng Guofan, and tennis player Peng Shuai.

Xiangtan forms a part of the Greater Changsha Metropolitan Region with Changsha as the core city along with Zhuzhou, also known as Changzhutan City Cluster, one of the core cities in Central China.

Xiangtan is one of the top 200 cities in the world by scientific research outputs, as tracked by the Nature Index. It is home to Xiangtan University, a Double First-Class Construction university, and two provincial key public universities of Hunan Institute of Engineering and Hunan University of Science and Technology, as well as a high-tech industrial development zone.

== Etymology ==
The name "Xiangtan" is derived from local geography, but the explanations for its origin vary somewhat in details. In any case, "Xiang" (湘) refers to the Xiang River, while "Tan" (潭) is a Chinese term that means "deep pool", specifically one produced by a moving current or waterfall; "Tan" in rivers generally are places where the current eddies. One reasoning is that the city was built by a large eddy in a bend of the Xiang River, and was thus called "Xiang-Tan". Another more likely story says the name originated in the Xiangzhou Eddy, today called the Zhao Eddy (昭潭). The Zhao Eddy is an ancient whirlpool located in a deep section of the Xiang River near the traditional border between Xiangtan and Changsha, and is named for King Zhao of Zhou, who is said to have died there.

== History ==
=== Pre-Ming dynasty ===
Relics from the Daxi culture indicate that people inhabited the Xiangtan area in the 3rd millennium BC. Shang dynasty bronzewares have been found in the region, as well as tombs from the Warring States period. During the Three Kingdoms period, the kingdom of Eastern Wu built a city in the west of modern Xiangtan City and organized the Hengyang Commandery (衡陽郡) around it. In 749, the Tang dynasty organized the area as Xiangtan County, centered at modern Yisu River (易俗河). By the time of the Northern Song dynasty, Xiangtan's good access to both land and water trade routes had established it as the major commercial center of the region.

=== Ming and Qing dynasties ===
Xiangtan prospered throughout the Ming dynasty and Qing dynasty upon an economic foundation of trading in rice and traditional Chinese medicinal ingredients, and was sometimes referred to as "Little Nanjing" or "Golden Xiangtan". Prior to the Second Opium War, Xiangtan was a central transfer point for import and export goods going to and from ports in Canton, Shanghai, and Wuhan, supported by approximately 200,000 inhabitants.

== Geography ==
Xiangtan is located on the lower reaches of the Xiang River.

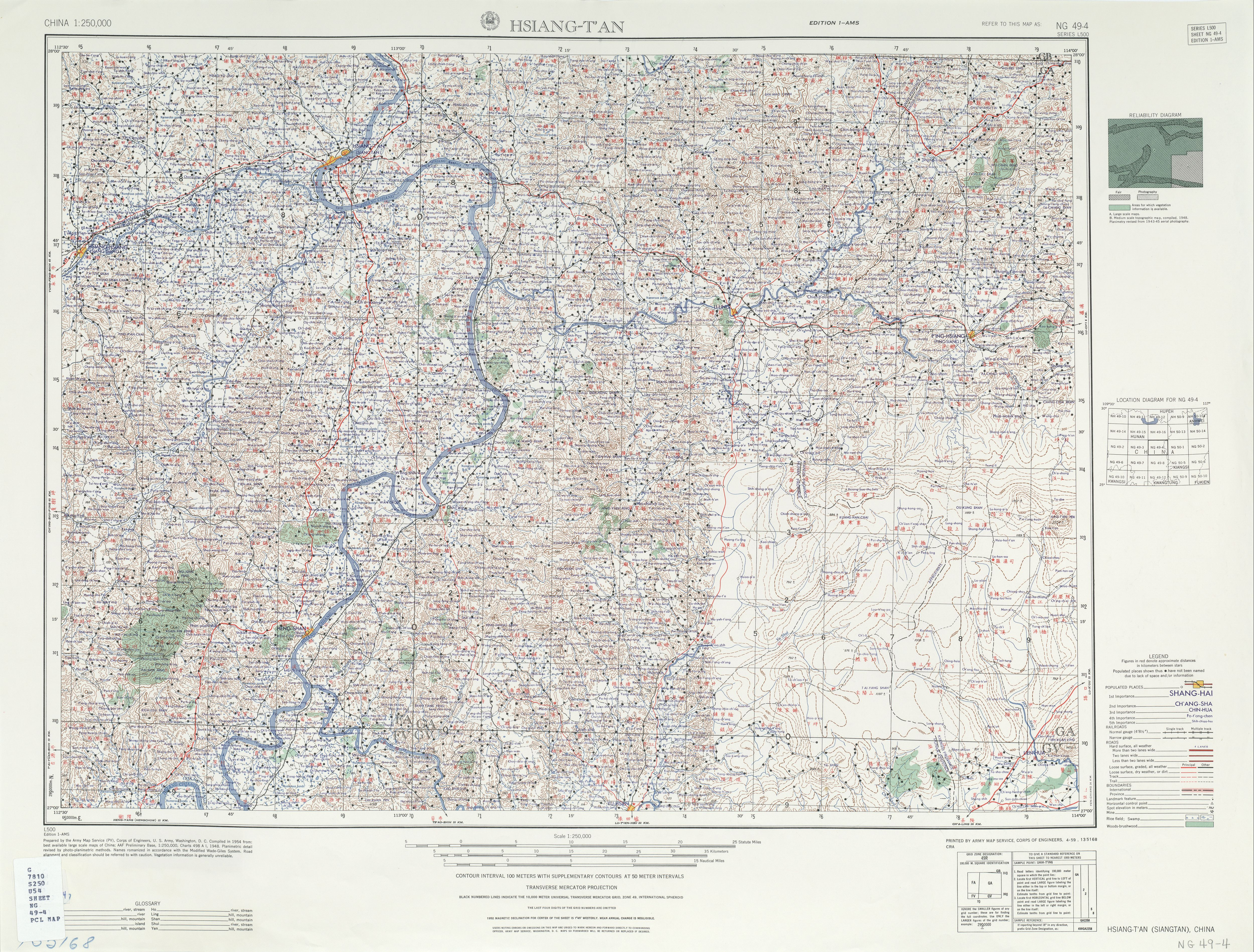
Map including Xiangtan (labeled as HSIANG-T'AN (SIANGTAN) 湘潭) (AMS, 1954)

=== Climate ===
Xiangtan has a humid subtropical climate with long, hot summers, and cool to cold, cloudy, damp winters with occasional snow flurries. Within its administrative area, the annual mean temperature is 17.4 °C (63.3 °F), with the coolest month being January, which averages 5.1 °C (41.2 °F), and the hottest July, at 29.1 °C (84.4 °F).

Climate data for Xiangtan, elevation 64 m (210 ft), (1991–2020 normals, extremes 1981–present)
Month	Jan	Feb	Mar	Apr	May	Jun	Jul	Aug	Sep	Oct	Nov	Dec	Year
Record high °C (°F)	23.5 (74.3)	30.1 (86.2)	33.8 (92.8)	35.4 (95.7)	36.0 (96.8)	37.5 (99.5)	39.6 (103.3)	41.8 (107.2)	40.0 (104.0)	34.2 (93.6)	32.7 (90.9)	25.2 (77.4)	41.8 (107.2)
Mean daily maximum °C (°F)	8.8 (47.8)	11.8 (53.2)	16.1 (61.0)	22.6 (72.7)	27.1 (80.8)	30.1 (86.2)	33.7 (92.7)	33.1 (91.6)	28.9 (84.0)	23.6 (74.5)	17.8 (64.0)	11.7 (53.1)	22.1 (71.8)
Daily mean °C (°F)	5.3 (41.5)	7.9 (46.2)	11.9 (53.4)	17.9 (64.2)	22.5 (72.5)	25.9 (78.6)	29.1 (84.4)	28.3 (82.9)	24.2 (75.6)	18.8 (65.8)	13.1 (55.6)	7.5 (45.5)	17.7 (63.9)
Mean daily minimum °C (°F)	2.8 (37.0)	5.1 (41.2)	8.9 (48.0)	14.5 (58.1)	19.1 (66.4)	22.8 (73.0)	25.6 (78.1)	25.0 (77.0)	20.9 (69.6)	15.4 (59.7)	9.7 (49.5)	4.4 (39.9)	14.5 (58.1)
Record low °C (°F)	−6.2 (20.8)	−8.0 (17.6)	−1.6 (29.1)	2.4 (36.3)	9.6 (49.3)	13.2 (55.8)	19.3 (66.7)	17.1 (62.8)	12.1 (53.8)	2.0 (35.6)	−1.4 (29.5)	−12.1 (10.2)	−12.1 (10.2)
Average precipitation mm (inches)	73.2 (2.88)	87.7 (3.45)	144.6 (5.69)	156.1 (6.15)	198.1 (7.80)	230.7 (9.08)	157.8 (6.21)	105.7 (4.16)	76.1 (3.00)	61.8 (2.43)	77.2 (3.04)	55.1 (2.17)	1,424.1 (56.06)
Average precipitation days (≥ 0.1 mm)	13.9	14.1	17.7	17.0	16.6	15.1	10.3	11.0	9.0	10.1	10.4	10.6	155.8
Average snowy days	4.5	2.2	0.4	0	0	0	0	0	0	0	0.1	1.6	8.8
Average relative humidity (%)	81	81	83	81	82	84	77	79	81	79	79	79	81
Mean monthly sunshine hours	61.6	66.2	81.7	108.8	138.8	141.1	231.3	214.2	159.1	132.4	113.9	96.0	1,545.1
Percentage possible sunshine	19	21	22	28	33	34	55	53	44	38	36	30	34
Source: China Meteorological Administration All-time Dec high

== Administrative divisions ==
The city of Xiangtan has direct jurisdiction over two districts (区; qū), two county-level cities (市; shì), and one county (县; xiàn):

- Yuetang District (岳塘区)
- Yuhu District (雨湖区)
- Shaoshan City (韶山市)
- Xiangxiang City (湘乡市)
- Xiangtan County (湘潭县)

Map
Name	Simplified Chinese	Hanyu Pinyin	Population (2010)	Area (km^{2})
City Proper
Yuetang District	岳塘区	Yuètáng Qū	501,348	206.4
Yuhu District	雨湖区	Yǔhú Qū	457,955	451.39
Suburban
Shaoshan City	韶山市	Sháoshān Shì	86,036	247.3
Xiangxiang City	湘乡市	Xiāngxiāng Shì	787,216	1,912.7
Rural
Xiangtan County	湘潭县	Xiāngtán Xiàn	915,997	2,132.8

== Demographics ==
As of 2010 census, Xiangtan had 2,748,552 inhabitants, of whom 1,877,919 lived in the built-up area (2 urban districts plus Xiangtan county). Together with the four adjoining urban districts of Zhuzhou, its built-up area is home to 2,933,069 inhabitants. In 2007, the city was named China's top ten livable cities by Chinese Cities Brand Value Report, which was released at the 2007 Beijing Summit of China Cities Forum.

== Economy ==
In 2006, Xiangtan's nominal GDP was ¥42.2 billion (US$6.2 billion), a year-on-year growth of 13.2% from the previous year. Its per capita GDP was ¥15,455 (US$2,265).

Xiangtan is famous for its production of lotus seed and soy sauce. People in Xiangtan like to chew areca nut (槟榔; bīngláng), though the area itself doesn't grow them. Most raw areca nut fruits are from Hainan and processed locally. The history of consuming areca nut dates back to 400 years ago, when people chewed it for pandemic prevention. Nowadays, it is quite common to see people chewing areca nut in Hunan. In 2003, the sales revenue of areca nut industry in Xiangtan had reached ¥800 million.

== Government ==
The current Chinese Communist Party Committee Secretary of Xiangtan is Cao Jiongfang and the current mayor is Zhang Yingchun.

== Transportation ==
Xiangtan is well connected by roads, river and rail. There is a shuttle bus service connecting to Changsha Huanghua International Airport.

== Tourism ==
Many people continue to visit Shaoshan, Xiangtan to visit the birthplace of Mao Zedong, the former Chairman of the Chinese Communist Party and the paramount leader of the People's Republic of China from 1949 to 1976.

Some local people like to visit Zhaoshan, a small mountain surrounded by trees in Xiangtan.

== Sports ==
Professional tennis player Peng Shuai was born and trained in Xiangtan. Xiangtan Stadium was the home to Bayi Football Team of the Chinese Football Association Jia League (now Chinese Super League) from 2002 to 2003.

== Colleges and universities ==
Xiangtan is one of the top 200 cities in the world by scientific research outputs, as tracked by the Nature Index. It is home to Xiangtan University, a Double First-Class Construction university, and two provincial key public universities, Hunan Institute of Engineering and Hunan University of Science and Technology. Following is a list of institutions with full-time bachelor programs in Xiangtan:

- Xiangtan University (湘潭大学)
- Hunan University of Science and Technology (湖南科技大学)
- Hunan Institute of Engineering (湖南工程学院)
- Xiangtan Institute of Technology (湘潭理工学院)
- Hunan Software Vocational and Technical University (湖南软件职业技术大学)

== Notable people ==
Xiangtan is the birthplace of:

- Mao Zedong
- Mao Yichang
- Mao Ning
- Peng Dehuai
- Qi Baishi
- Zeng Guofan
- James Soong
- Tang Hongbo
- Peng Shuai
- Ma Ho-ling
- Ma Ying-jeou

== See also ==
- List of Catholic dioceses in China
- List of twin towns and sister cities in China
