= Hunan Institute of Engineering =

Provincial public college in Xiangtan, Hunan, China

- 湖南工程学院
- Former names: Xiangtan Institute of Machinery
- Motto: 锲而不舍 敢为人先
- Motto in English: Perseverance and Initiative
- Type: Public college
- Established: 1951; 75 years ago
- President: Yi Bing (易兵)
- Administrative staff: 1,547 (September 2019)
- Students: 17,019 (September 2019)
- Location: Xiangtan, Hunan, China; 27.8540°N 112.9299°E
- Nickname: 湖工 in Chinese
- Website: www.hnie.edu.cn

The Hunan Institute of Engineering (Chinese: 湖南工程学院; pinyin: Húnán Gōngchéng Xuéyuàn) is a provincial public college in Xiangtan, Hunan, China. Despite its English name, the school has not been granted university status. The college is under the Hunan Provincial Department of Education.

The college was founded in 1951 and is organized into 16 schools and departments.

== History ==
Approved by the Ministry of Education in June 2000, the official name of HNIE came into being as a result of the merger of Xiangtan Institute of Machinery (机械工业部湘潭机电专科学校) and Electricity Technology and Hunan Textile College (湖南纺织专科学校). Xiangtan Institute of Machinery and Electricity Technology, founded in 1951, affiliated with the former National Ministry of Machinery Industry, was appraised to be the national key construction modeling school of higher technical colleges of engineering. Hunan Textile College, founded in 1978, was attached to the Hunan Provincial Bureau of Textile Industry. HNIE is under the joint support of the central government and Hunan provincial government, the latter being mainly in charge of its administration.

== Rankings ==
The Best Chinese Universities Ranking, also known as the "Shanghai Ranking", placed the university 414 in China. The university ranked # 2568 in the world out of nearly 30,000 universities worldwide by the University Rankings by Academic Performance 2023–2024.

== Notable alumni ==
- Wen Huazhi (文花枝)
