= Wan Pavilion =

Pavilion in Changsha, Hunan, China

- 万楼
- Location within Hunan Location within China

General information
- Type: Chinese pavilion
- Location: China
- Coordinates: 27°52′40″N 112°57′15″E
- Groundbreaking: 1615
- Renovated: 2017
- Affiliation: Xiangtan municipal government

Height
- Architectural: Chinese architecture

Technical details
- Material: Wood, brick, cement

Wan Pavilion (simplified Chinese: 万楼; traditional Chinese: 萬樓; pinyin: Wàn Lóu) is a Chinese pavilion located in Yuhu District of Changsha, Hunan, China.

== History ==
Wan Pavilion was originally built in 1615 by magistrate Bao Hongkui (包鸿逵) and named by Li Tengfang, a senior politician in the Ming dynasty (1368–1644), but because of war and natural disasters has been rebuilt numerous times since then. The present version was completed in 2017.

== Architecture ==
The total height of Wan Pavilion is 63.48-metre (208.3 ft), and the main building is 52.58-metre (172.5 ft). It has nine floors inside and five floors outside, which means "jiuwu zhizun (the imperial throne)" (九五之尊).

== Gallery ==
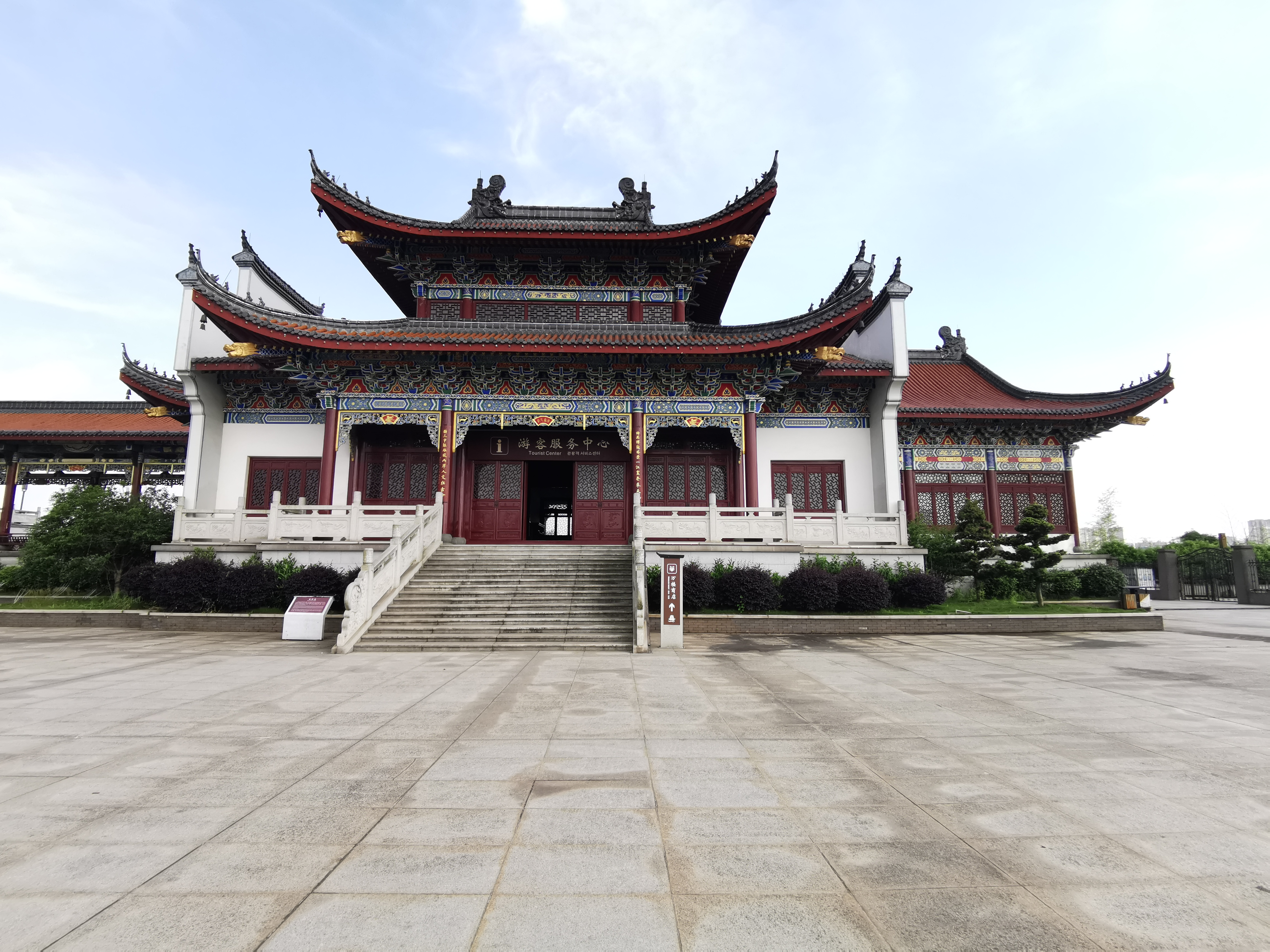
Tourist Centre

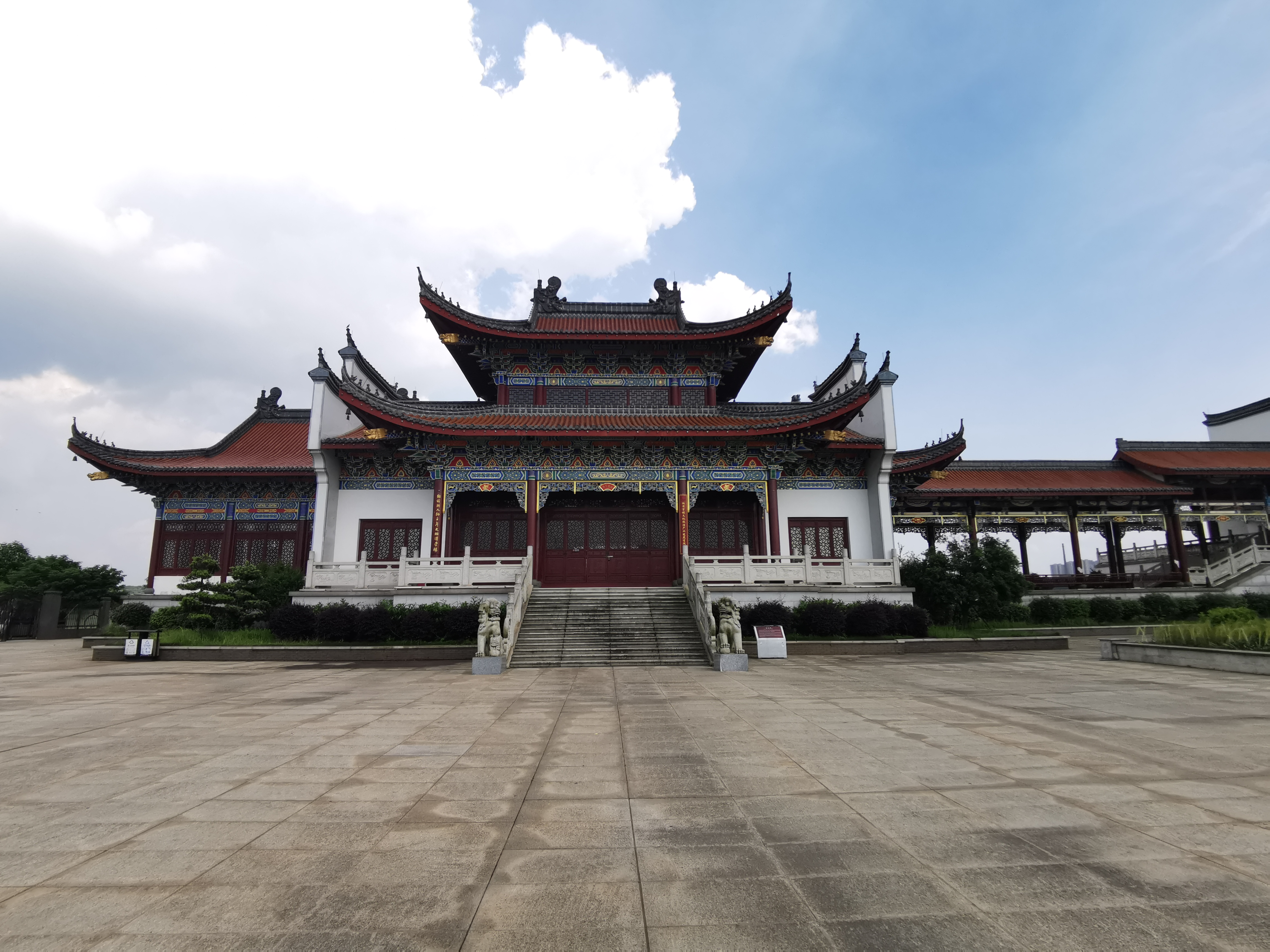
The Left Side Hall

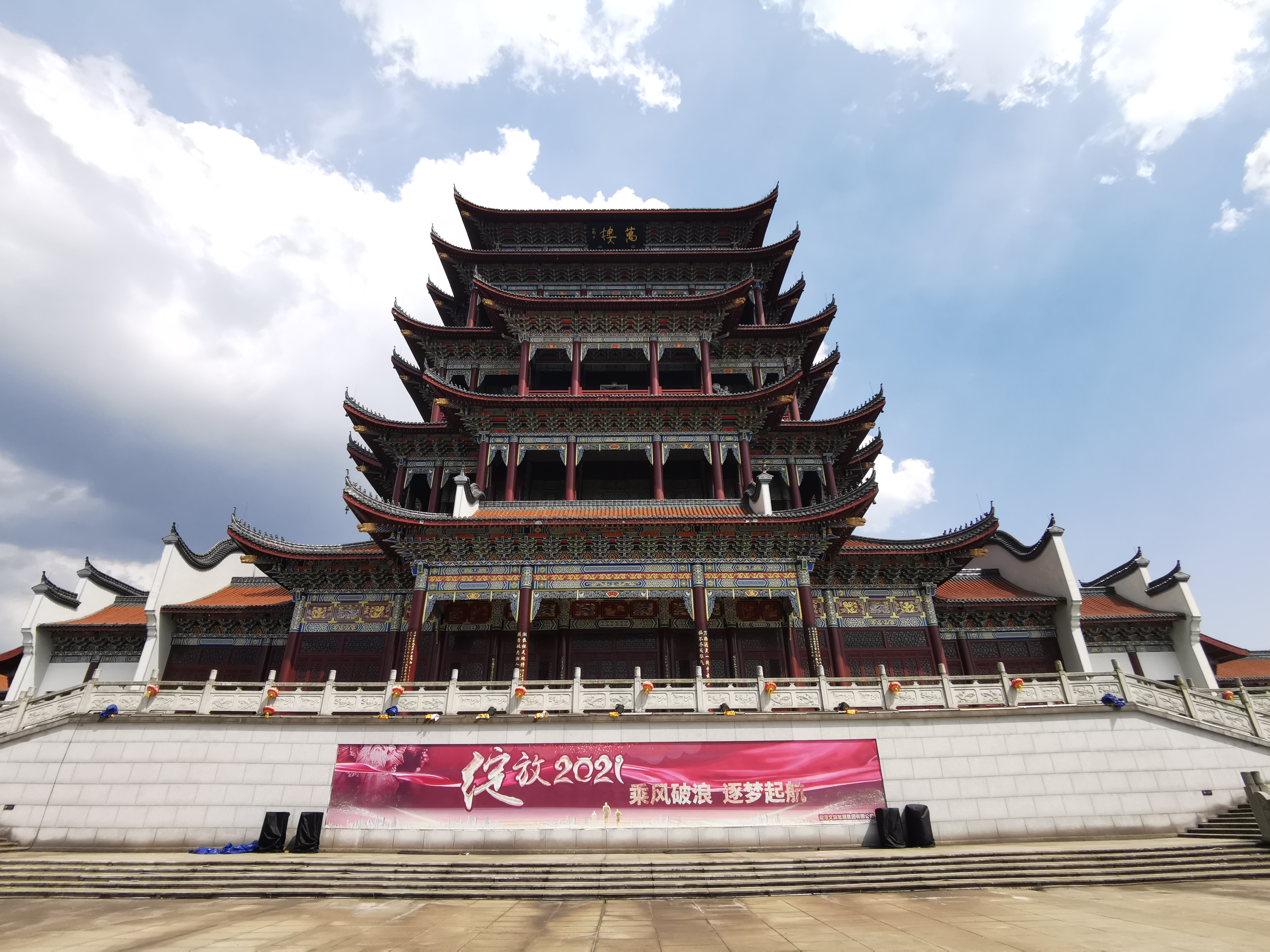
Wan Pavilion

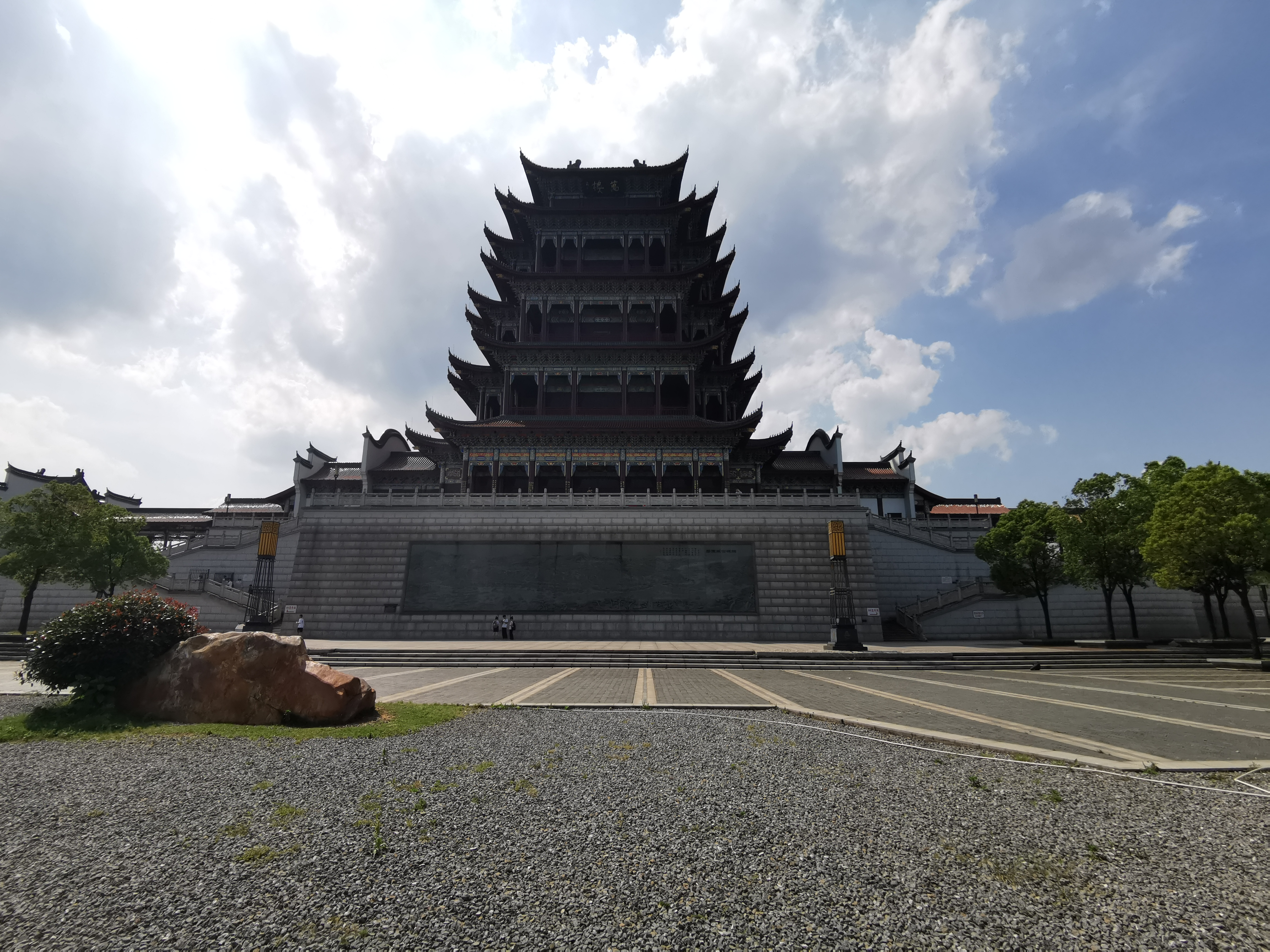
Wan Pavilion

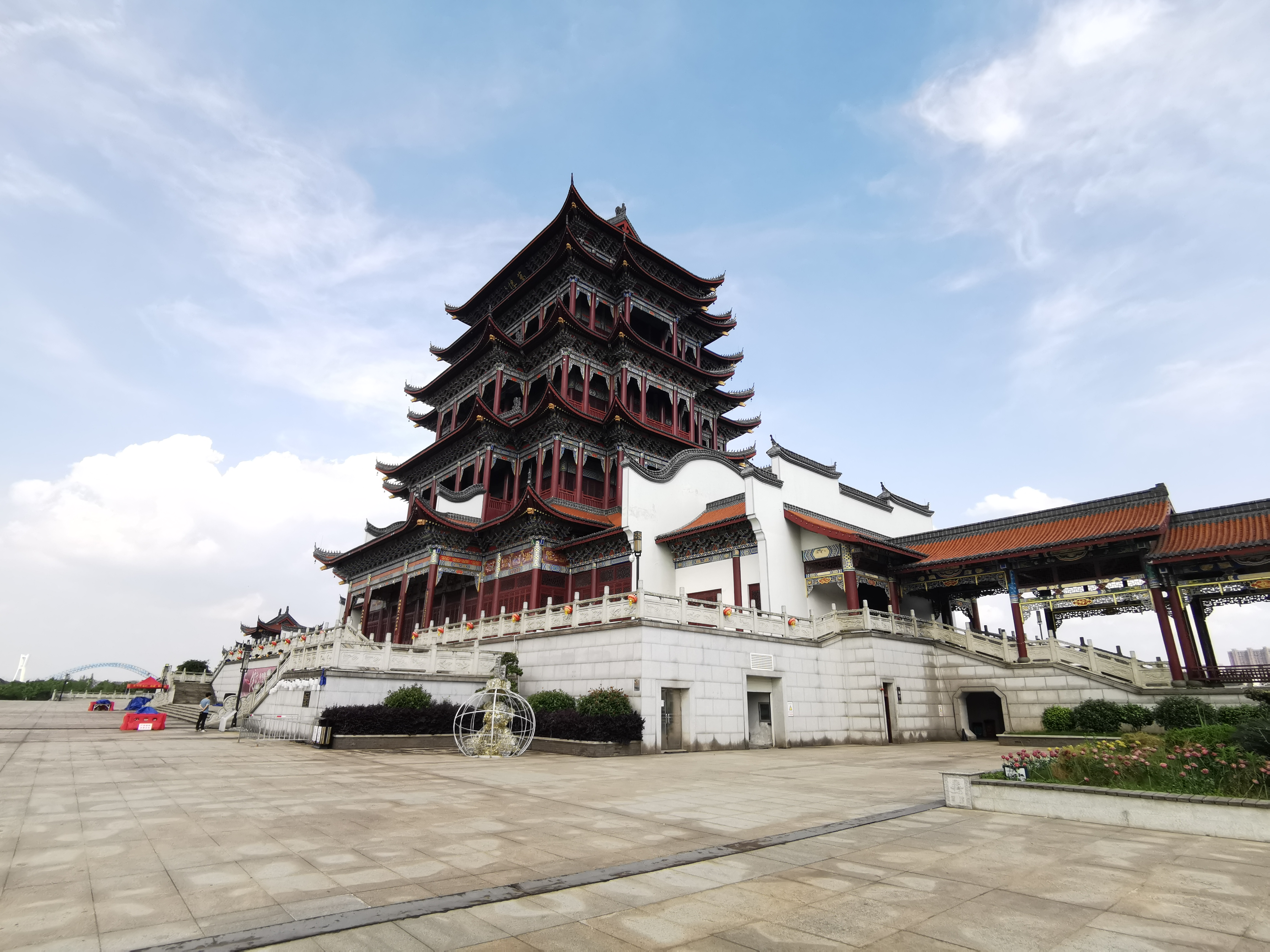
Wan Pavilion

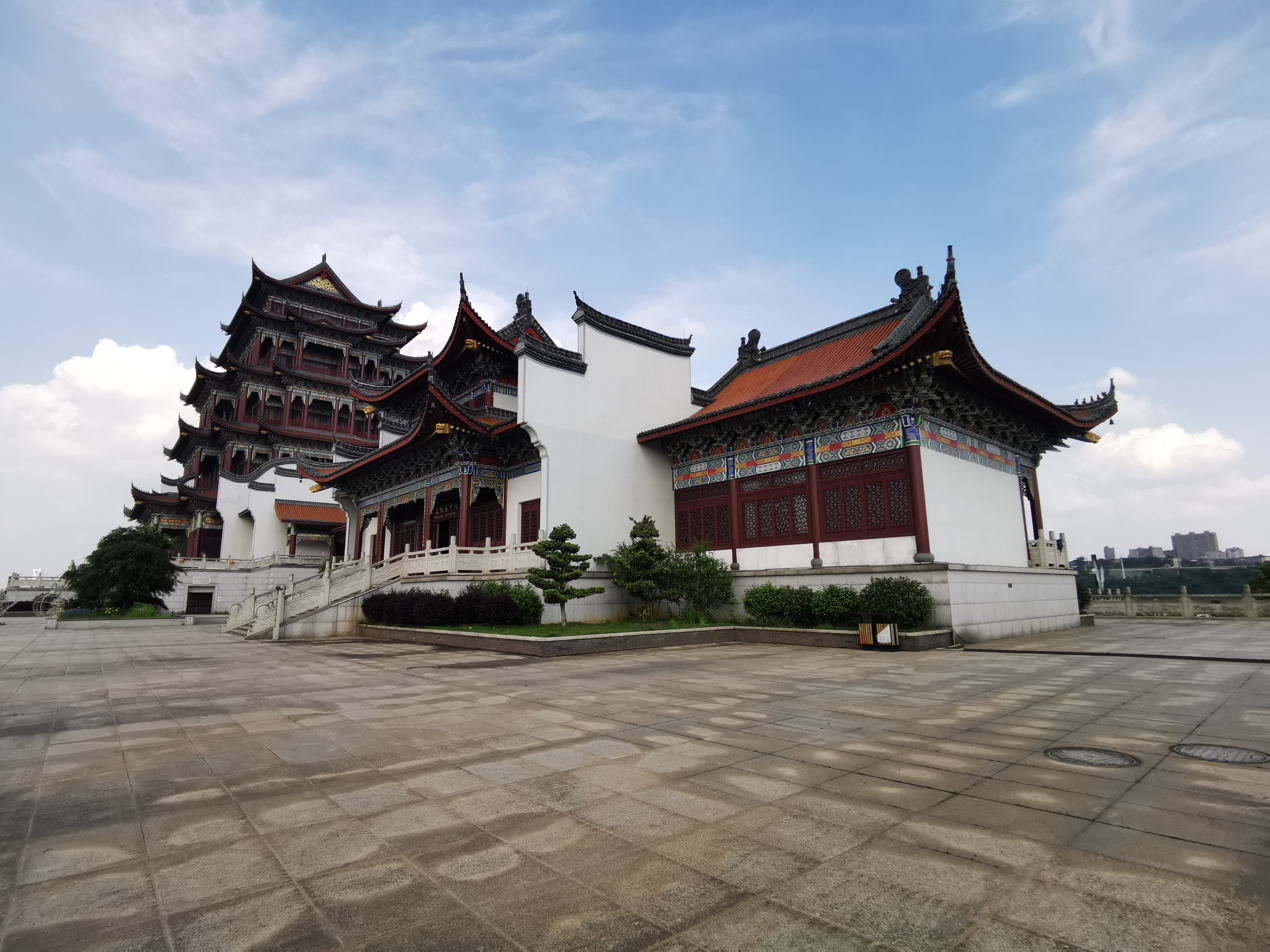
Wan Pavilion
