= Haihui Temple (Jiujiang) =

Buddhist temple in Jiujiang, Jiangxi, China

- 海会寺
- Location within China

Religion
- Affiliation: Buddhism
- Sect: Chan Buddhism

Location
- Location: Lianxi District, Jiujiang, Jiangxi, China
- Interactive map of Haihui Temple
- Coordinates: 29°32′32″N 116°02′36″E

Architecture
- Style: Chinese architecture
- Founder: Shi Xilai
- Established: 1618
- Completed: after 1945 (rebuilt)

Haihui Temple (simplified Chinese: 海会寺; traditional Chinese: 海會寺; pinyin: Hǎihuì Sì) is a Buddhist temple located in Lianxi District, Jiujiang, Jiangxi, China.

== History ==
Haihui Temple was originally built in 1618 by Chan master Shi Xilai (释西来), during the Ming dynasty (1368–1644). The temple was refurbished by Shi Danyun (释旦云) in 1817, in Jiaqing Emperor's reign of the Qing dynasty (1644–1911). In 1853, the temple was completely destroyed in the Taiping Rebellion. In 1866, Shi Haiyin (释海印) raised funds to restore Haihui Temple.

In the summer of 1938, when the Imperial Japanese Army attacked Mount Lu, Haihui Temple was bombed into ruins. After the Second Sino-Japanese War, the temple was rebuilt by monks, but the scale was not as magnificent and elegant as before.

After the establishment of the Communist State in 1949, the temple was used as the Lushan Branch of Communist Labor University (共产主义劳动大学庐山分校).

== Architecture ==
Haihui Temple is backed by Wulao Peak and faces Poyang Lake.
