= Yuetang, Xiangtan =

Yuetang 岳塘区
- District
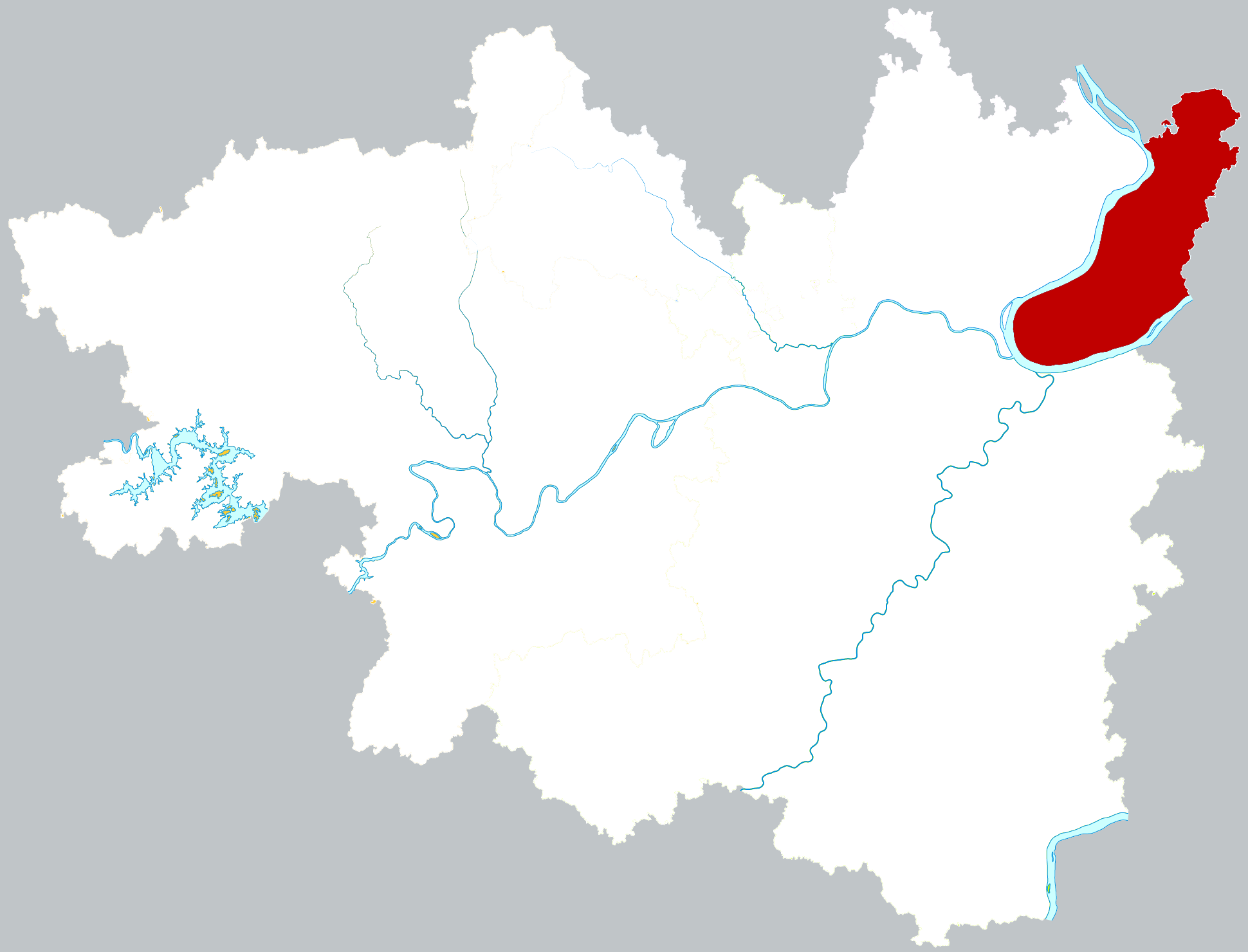
- Location of Yuetang District within Xiangtan

- Location in Hunan
- Coordinates: 27°52′21″N 112°58′07″E
- Country: China
- Province: Hunan
- Prefecture-level city: Xiangtan
- District seat: Hetang Subdistrict

Area
  - Total: 206.4 km^{2} (79.7 sq mi)

Population (2020 census)
  - Total: 483,762
  - Density: 2,344/km^{2} (6,070/sq mi)
- Time zone: UTC+8 (China Standard)
- Website: www.hnxtyt.gov.cn

Yuetang District (simplified Chinese: 岳塘区; traditional Chinese: 岳塘區; pinyin: Yuètáng Qū) is one of two urban districts in Xiangtan City, Hunan Province, China. Located in the eastern region of the city proper and on the northeastern shoreside of the Xiang River, the district is bordered to the north by Tianxin and Yuhua Districts of Changsha City, to the east by Shifeng and Tianyuan Districts of Zhuzhou City, to the south by Xiangtan County, and to the west by Hetang District. Yuetang District covers 206.4 km^{2} (79.7 sq mi). As of 2015, it had a registered population of 350,300 and a resident population of 467,800. The district has 14 subdistricts and a town under its jurisdiction, and the government seat is at Bantang Subdistrict (板塘街道).

== Administrative divisions ==
Yuetang has 11 subdistricts and 1 town under its jurisdictions.

11 subdistricts

- Yutang Subdistrict (岳塘街道)
- Dongping Subdistrict (东坪街道)
- Shuyuanlu Subdistrict (书院路街道)
- Xiashesi Subdistrict (下摄司街道)
- Jianshelu Subdistrict (建设路街道)
- Wulidui Subdistrict (五里堆街道)
- Baota Subdistrict (宝塔街道)
- Xiacheng Subdistrict (霞城街道)
- Hetang Subdistrict (荷塘街道)
- Shuangma Subdistrict (双马街道)
- Bantang Subdistrict (板塘街道)

1 town

- Zhaoshan Township (昭山镇)
