= Hunan University of Science and Technology =

Public university in Xiangtan, Hunan, China

- 湖南科技大学
- Motto: 唯实惟新 至诚致志
- Type: Public
- Established: 18 August 1949; 77 years ago
- Affiliations: Hunan Education Department
- President: Zhu Chuanqu (朱川曲)
- Academic staff: 2,567 (August 2019)
- Students: 36,714 (August 2019)
- Location: Xiangtan, Hunan, China; 27°54′16″N 112°55′02″E
- Campus: 3,100 mu
- Colors
- Website: english.hnust.edu.cn

Chinese name
- Traditional Chinese: 湖南科技大學
- Simplified Chinese: 湖南科技大学
Transcriptions
Standard Mandarin
- Hanyu Pinyin: Húnán Kējì Dàxué

The Hunan University of Science and Technology (HNUST; Chinese: 湖南科技大学; pinyin: Húnán Kējì Dàxué) is a provincial public university in Xiangtan, Hunan of China, under the jointly jurisdiction of the central government and the provincial government, and is mainly administered by Hunan Province.

== History ==
Hunan University of Science & Technology (HNUST), which evolves from Northern Hunan Construction College founded in 1949 and was formed in 2003 by the merger of Xiangtan Institute of Technology and Xiangtan Normal University.

== Rankings and Reputation ==
As of 2022, Hunan University of Science and Technology was ranked 101st in China, 261st in Asia and 988th globally by the U.S. News & World Report Best Global University Ranking.

The 2023 CWTS Leiden Ranking ranked Hunan University of Science and Technology 989th in the world based on their publications for the period 2018–2021. The Nature Index 2023 by Nature Research ranked the university among the top 1000 leading research institutions globally for the high quality of research publications in natural science.

University rankings

Global – Overall
- USNWR Global: 988 (2022)

Regional – Overall
- USNWR Asia: 261 (2022)

National – Overall
- USNWR National: 101 (2022)

Overall, Hunan University of Science and Technology was ranked in the top 1000 universities in the world by several international rankings including the CWTS Leiden Ranking, the U.S. News & World Report, and the Nature Index.

=== Subjects Rankings ===
Subjects ranking by	2022 Global Ranking
U.S. News & World Report Best Global University Ranking
Chemistry	384th
Computer Science	411th
Engineering	601th
Material Science	659th
Academic Ranking of World Universities (ARWU)
Civil Engineering	201-300
Chemical Engineering	301-400
Computer Science & Engineering	301-400
Chemistry	401-500
Electrical & Electronic Engineering	401-500
