= Qingyi =

Qingyi may refer to:

- Qingyi (Chinese opera) (青衣), a type of female role in Chinese opera
- Qingyi, Sichuan (青义), a town in Mianyang, Sichuan, China
- Qingyi Expressway, a common name for the G3016 Qingshuihe–Yining Expressway in Xinjiang, China
- Qingyi Movement, a faction of conservative officials in late 19th century China
- Hexing qingyi, an extinct species of ornithomimosaur

== Rivers of China ==
- Qingyi River (Anhui) (青弋江), a tributary of lower Yangtze River in Anhui
- Qingyi River (Henan) (清潩河), a tributary of the Ying River in Henan
- Qingyi River (Sichuan) (青衣江), a tributary of the Dadu River in western Sichuan

== Hong Kong ==
- Tsing Yi (青衣), an island of Hong Kong
  - Tsing Yi Town, a town on the eastern coast of the island
  - Tsing Yi Hui, a former town on the island
