= History of Changsha =

Changsha (capital of Hunan province in the People's Republic of China) has a history going back over 3000 years. It has grown to an important town of economy, culture and garrison in the southern area of Chu State (1115 B.C.-223 B.C.). In the Later Tang dynasty (923-936), the king of Chu, Ma Yin, founded the Chu Kingdom (927-963) and set it as the capital, the city quickly became the largest and most important population, commercial and financial center in southern China. It was devastated by the Second Sino-Japanese War and the Wenxi Fire in 1938 but was quickly rebuilt. As of 2016, Changsha was ranked 13th of cities of China by comprehensive strength in 2016.

== Prehistory ==
The history of Changsha dates back to the primitive times. As early as the Paleolithic Period (20,000 to 150,000 years ago), there have been human activities in Changsha. The 7,100 year old Neolithic cultural relics at Nantuo Datang (南托大塘) have shown us the time-honored rice cultivation civilization of Changsha.

== Xia-Shang-Zhou Period ==
In the Xia-Shang-Zhou Period, Changsha came under the jurisdiction of an ancient kingdom, Sanmiao (三苗).

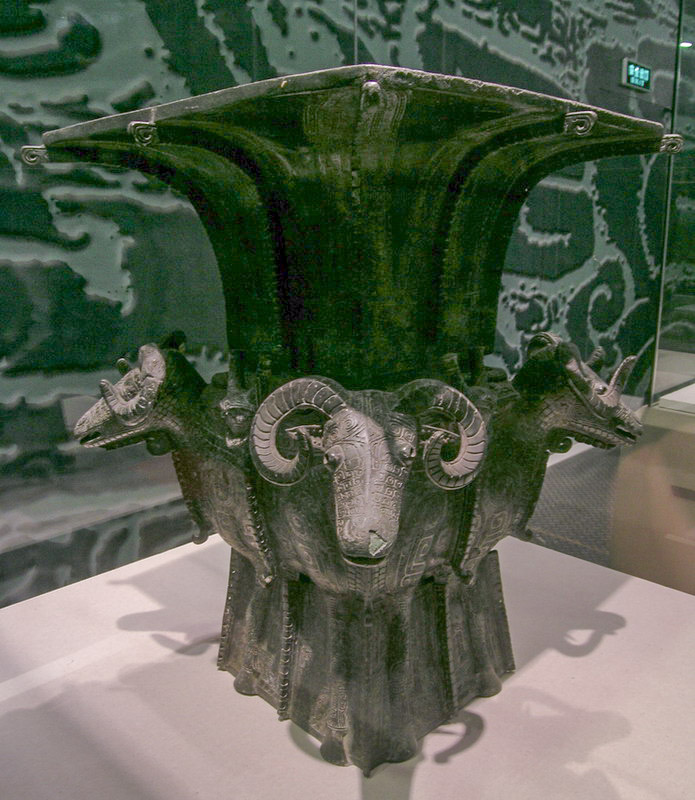
The Four-goat Square Zun is exhibited in the National Museum of China.

In the Shang dynasty (about 1,600 B.C.-1046 B.C.), Changsha was under the jurisdiction of Yangyue (扬越), which was a branch of Baiyue tribe (百越). The aboriginal culture has reached a certain level here. The most well-known human habitation in Changsha area was at Huangcai Town, where evidence was found of Tanheli site dated back to Shang dynasty (1159 B.C.-1046 B.C.). In the 20th century, the Four-goat Square Zun and Dahe Renmianwen Square Ding were discovered at Tanheli site in Huangcai Town of Ningxiang. The artifacts date to the late Shang dynasty (11th-10th century B.C.) and are preserved in the National Museum of China.

== Warring States Period ==
In the Warring States Period (475 B.C.-221 B.C.), Changsha was under the jurisdiction of Qianzhong Commandery (黔中郡) of Chu State and it was an important town of economy, culture and garrison in the southern area of Chu. In the late period of Chu, Qu Yuan was exiled to Yuanxiang (沅湘, today's Hunan province), he is known for his patriotism and contributions to classical poetry and verses, especially through the poems of the Chu Ci anthology (also known as The Songs of the South or Songs of Chu): a volume of poems attributed to or considered to be inspired by his verse writing.

== Han dynasty ==
In the 5th year (202 B.C.) of Emperor Gaozu of Han, king of Changsha, Wu Rui, set Changsha as capital and named it as Linxiang County (临湘县). In the early Western Han dynasty (208 BC-8 AD), Sanshishu Town (三石戍城) was fortified at Sanchaji (三汊矶) on the west bank of Xiangjiang River. In the late Western Han dynasty, a waterside town, named “Beijin Town” (北津城), was fortified at the dock of Xiangjiang River outside the area from today's Daxi Gate (大西门) to Tonghuo Gate (通货门).

== Wei, Jin, Southern and Northern dynasties ==
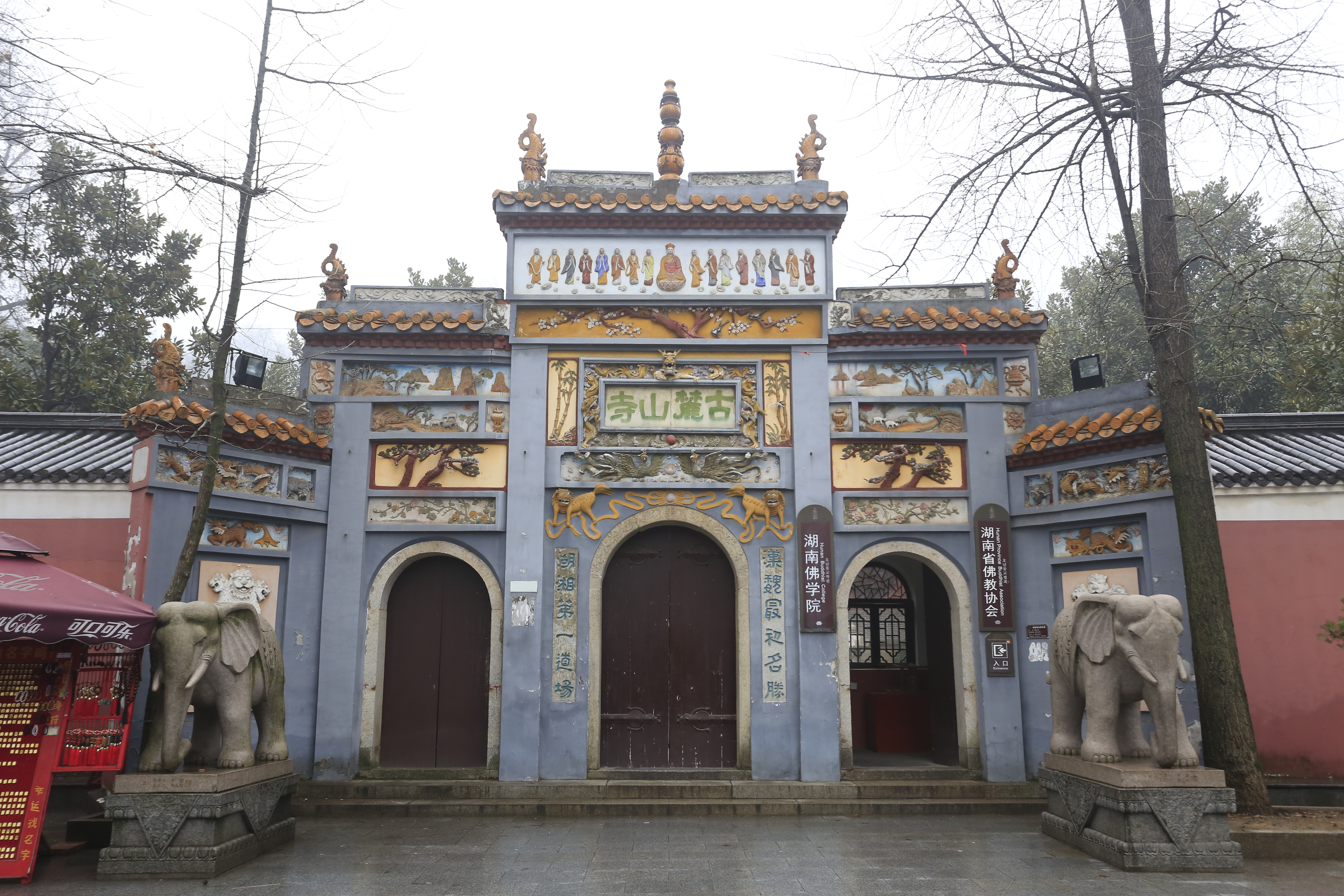
Shanmen of Lushan Temple.

Buddhism was introduced into Changsha same time in the 3rd century, in the 4th year (268) of Taishi Period of Jin dynasty (266-316), Lushan Temple was built at Mount Yuelu by the Indian Buddhist monk Zhu Fachong (竺法崇).

In the Southern dynasty (420-589), Xiangxi County was separated from Linxiang County. Linxiang was the chief county of Changsha Commandery. In the 1st year of Yongjia period of Western Jin dynasty, Jingzhou and Jiangzhou (江州) are separated, and Xiangzhou (湘州) was set up. Linxiang County became the seat of local government.

== Sui and Tang dynasties ==
In the Sui and Tang dynasties (581-907), the wall of Changsha extended eastward to Xiaowu Gate (小吴门), Liuyang Gate (浏阳门), southward to Nanmenkou (南门口), westward to the Daxi and Xiaoxi Gates (大西门、小西门), and northward to the south of Sima Bridge (司马桥), Dengzi Bridge (戥子桥) and Huoyuan Bridge (活元桥).

In the year of 589, Sui Empire (581-618) unified China and changed Liuxiang County to Changsha County, and took Tanzhou as the place of local government.

In the 3rd year of Daye Period, Sui changed Tanzhou to Changsha Commandery (长沙郡).

In the Tang dynasty (618-907), Changsha was set as Tanzhou and later as Changsha Commandery.

In the middle Tang dynasty, the economy in Changsha became increasingly prosperous, Liuyang saw a rise of production of fireworks, and Changsha Tongguan Kiln (铜官窑) invented underglaze painted porcelain. At the time, the Buddhism flourished, Miyin Temple was established in Ningxiang and Shishuang Temple was built in Liuyang.

Since the Zhenguan Period of Tang dynasty, talented people gathered in Changsha in succession. Ouyang Xun and his son were proficient in both regular and cursive calligraphies. Huaisu was famous for his vivid and powerful penmanship. Du Fu, Li Bai, Han Yu, Meng Haoran, Li Shangyin, Zhang Jiuling and many other celebrities have served as an official, or settled in Changsha, leaving innumerable popular poetic inscriptions.

== Five Dynasties and Ten Kingdoms ==
In the Five Dynasties and Ten Kingdoms (907-960), in the 2nd year of Tiancheng Period of Later Tang dynasty (927), the king of Chu, Ma Yin, founded Chu Kingdom and set Changsha as its capital. The north city wall extended to the area around Xiangya Road (湘雅路) which was located to the south of today's Kaifu Temple. Longxi County (龙喜县) was set up in southeastern Changsha, and Luzhiling (鹿芝岭) of Huangxing Town was the county seat. Ma's kingdom was committed to actively developing agriculture, industry and commerce. As it became stronger, the kingdom established Huichun Park, Jiayan Hall, Bixiang Palace and Jiulong Palace successively at south and north area of the city, later, Kaifu Temple was built at Huichun Park, facilitating the development of Buddhism.

In the 2nd year of Guangshun Period in the Later Zhou dynasty (952), Bian Hao, the general of Southern Tang kingdom, invaded the Chu kingdom, leading the demise of the Chu kingdom.

== Song dynasty ==
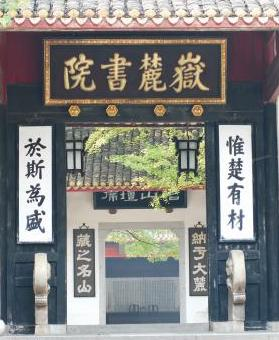
Entrance of Yuelu Academy.

In the Song dynasty (960-1279), Changsha's economy and culture ascended to a new level, and the education was extremely prosperous.

In February of the 1st year of Qiande (963), Tanzhou was incorporated into the territory of Song Empire. Two years later in 965, Longxi County was renamed as Changfeng County (常丰县), the county seat was moved to today's East Lake Subdistrict of Furong District, it was the predecessor of Shanhua County (善化县).

In the 3rd year of Zhidao Period (997), the whole country was divided into 15 zones, and Tanzhou was the seat of the government for South Jing-Hu Zone (荆湖南路).

In the 1st year of Yuanfu (1098), Shanhua County was set up, and separated from Changsha County and both counties were governed independently under the jurisdiction of the same city.

In the 9th year of Kaibao Period (976), chief of Tanzhou, Zhu Dong (朱洞), founded the Yuelu Academy at the foot of Yuelu Mountain, and made it among the "four best academies" of the country.

In the 3rd year of Qiandao Period, Zhu Xi came to Changsha and worked for Yuelu Academy together with Zhang Shi.

In the 2nd year of Shaoxing Period, Li Gang, anfushi of Huan (湖南安抚使), proposed the emperor to demolish the city wallby one third, relocated the north city wall to the area around today's Xiangchun Road (湘春路).

== Yuan dynasty ==
In the 13th year (1276) of Zhiyuan Period of the Yuan dynasty (1271-1368), Changsha was incorporated into the territory of Yuan Empire. In the following year, the Tanzhou province was set up. In the 18th year (1281) of Zhiyuan Period, Tanzhou province was renamed Tanzhoulu (潭州路). In the 2nd year (1329) of Tianli Period, Tanzhoulu was changed as Tianlinlu (天临路). In the 24th year (1364) of Zhizheng Period, Xu Da liberated Changsha, renamed it Tanzhou Prefecture (潭州府).

== Ming dynasty ==
During the Hongwu Period (1368-1398) of Ming dynasty (1368-1644), the city wall along the Xiangjiang River was repaired, four west gates was restored, and seven wharfs were built along the Xiangjiang River. In June of the 5th year of Hongwu Period, Tanzhou was renamed as Changsha Prefecture (长沙府) with 12 counties under its jurisdiction, Changsha was the seat of its government, and it was affiliated to Hu-Guang provincial administrative commissioner. The city wall was totally renovated and the footing of wall was built by stone stripes.

In the 14th year of Chenghua Period (1478), Prince Ji, also known as Zhu Jianjun (朱见浚), became the seignior of Changsha and founded his palace.

In the Wanli Period (1573-1620), Tang Yuan (唐源), the magistrate of Shanhua County, dug and dredged the South Lake Stream (南湖港河).

== Qing dynasty ==
In the 4th year of Shunzhi Period (1647) of Qing dynasty (1644-1911), Gao Shijun (高士浚) led his army to conquer Changsha and Changsha was then incorporated into the territory of Qing Empire. Changsha Prefecture was set up, affiliated to Hu-Guang Province and still possessed 12 counties. Prince Ji's palace was pulled down and the bricks and stones were used to consolidate the city wall and moat.

In the 3rd year of Kangxi Period (1664), Pianyuan Xunfu (偏沅巡抚, provincial governor) moved to Changsha. Hu-Guang Province (湖广行省) was divided into two provinces. Changsha came under the jurisdiction of Hunan province.

During the Yongzheng Period (1723-1736), Changsha extended from east to west and eight canals were built. Since they were approved by the Yongzheng Emperor personally, they were called “Imperial canals”. In the 2nd year of Yongzheng Period (1724), the title of Pianyuan Xunfu was renamed as Hunan Xunfu (湖南巡抚).

In around the 24th year of Guangxu Period (1898), the earliest industry zone came into being outside the south gate of Changsha. In around the 30th year of Guangxu Period (1904), Changsha was opened as a commercial port and the areas along the river could be rented by ferry operators. In the 31st year of Guangxu Period (1905), Changsha-Zhuzhou section of Yuehan Railway was completed. Changsha Railway Station was established outside the Xiaowu Gate (now Furong Square) of Changsha city wall.

== Republic of China ==
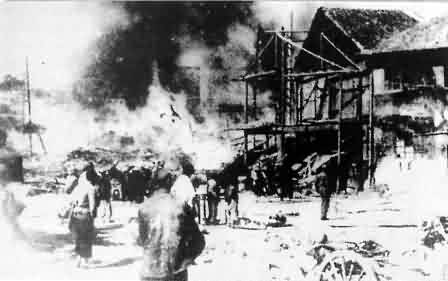
Wenxi Fire.

In April 1912, Changsha and Shanhua merged into Changsha County and Changsha Prefecture was revoked. Changsha County came under the direct jurisdiction of provincial government.

In 1913, Huang Xing proposed the urban planning concept for Changsha in the address that he delivered in the joint welcome meeting held by ten groups of Hunan province.

In 1921, Changsha government prepared “Changsha Municipal Planning”, planned the urban area extended southward to Chigangchong (赤岗冲) and Nanhugang (南湖港) and northward to Yazipu (鸭子铺) along the Liuyang River to the estuary of the Xiangjiang River.

In 1922, Changsha was selected as the capital of Hunan.

In 1924, the ancient city wall of Changsha was demolished, only Tianxin Pavilion section and the ancient pavilion were reserved.

From 1924 to 1932, Changsha government decided to build the riverside road.

In 1929, the first bituminous road was built with the name of “Zhongshan Road” (中山路), named after Sun Yat-sen.

In 1932, He Yuanwen (何元文), the first mayor of Changsha, presided over the preparation of the “Plan of Changsha New Urban Area”, and Yuanjialing (袁家岭) was planned as the central part of the urban area.

In 1933, Changsha was officially set as a city and become the capital of Hunan province.

In 1936, the Changsha section of Guangzhou-Wuchang Railway (粤汉铁路长沙段) was completely open to traffic.

In November 1938, the "Wenxi Fire" broke out. Most of the scenic spots and historical sites as well as the buildings inside the city were destroyed.

In 1941, the Changsha government prepared the “Planning for Changsha New Urban Area”, and planned that its population would increase to 1 million and the urban land would reach 119 square kilometers in 20 years.

== People's Republic of China ==
On August 5, 1949, Changsha was liberated peacefully and became the capital of Hunan province.

As of 2017, Changsha possesses 6 districts (Furong, Tianxin, Yuelu, Yuhua, Kaifu and Wangcheng) and 3 counties/cities (Changsha County, Ningxiang and Liuyang).
