= Zibei Pavilion =

- 自卑亭
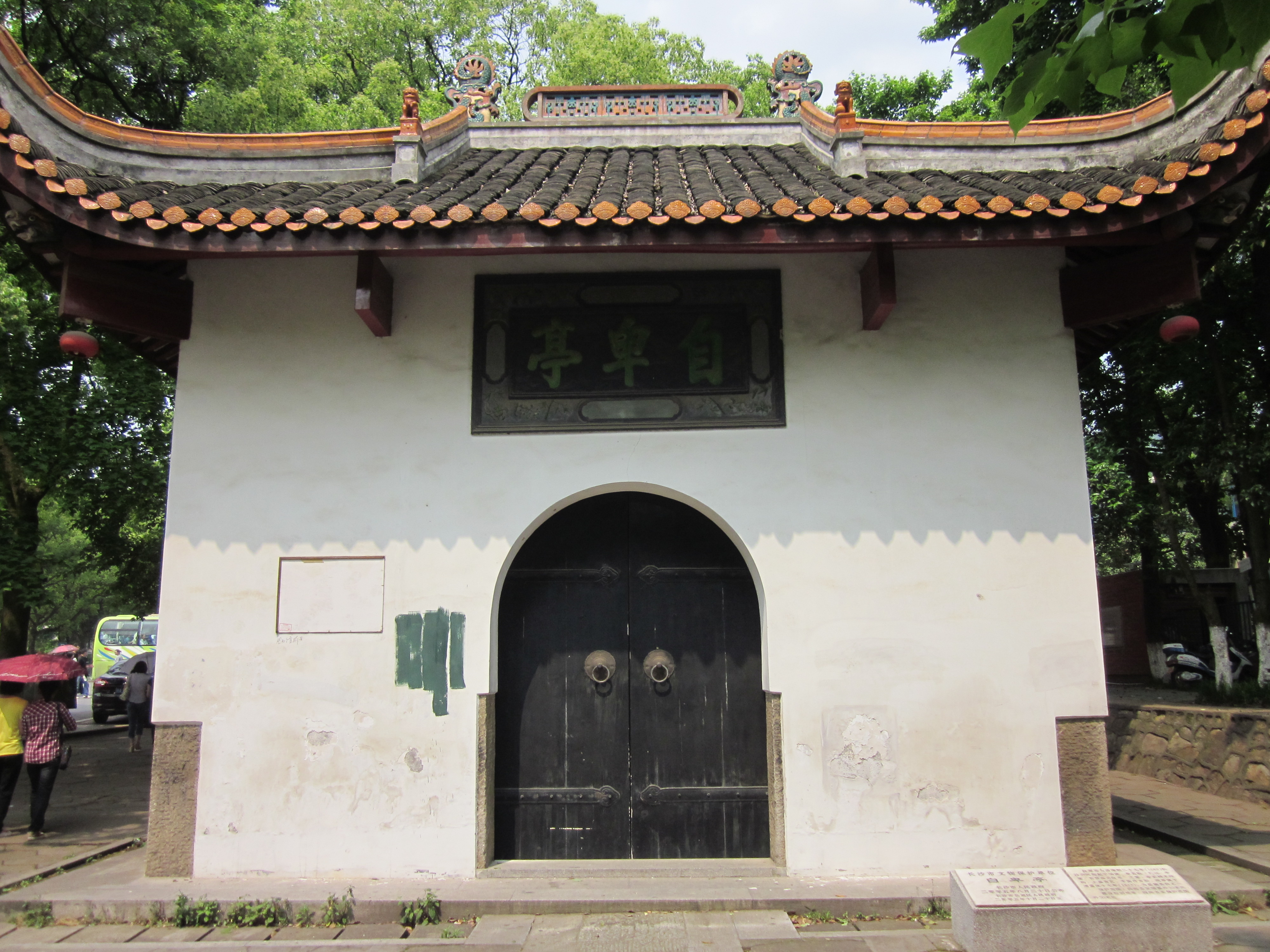
- Zibei Pavilion.

- Location within Hunan

General information
- Type: Chinese pavilion
- Location: Mount Yuelu, Yuelu District, Changsha, Hunan, China
- Coordinates: 28°11′09″N 112°57′04″E
- Construction started: 1688
- Completed: 1861 (reconstruction)

Height
- Roof: Gabbled roof

Zibei Pavilion (Chinese: 自卑亭; pinyin: Zìbēi Tíng; lit. 'Pavilion of Being Self-contempt') is a Chinese pavilion located at the foot of Mount Yuelu, in Yuelu District of Changsha, Hunan, China.

== Etymology ==
The name "Zibei" based on a sentence "君子之道，譬如远行，必自迩；譬如登高，必自卑。" comes from Doctrine of the Mean, one of the Four Books of Confucian philosophy.

== History ==
The original pavilion dates back to 1688, in the 27th year of Kangxi period (1661–1722) of the Qing dynasty (1644–1911). In 1812, Peng Mingyao (彭名曜), president of Yuelu Academy, moved it to its current address. The present version was completed in 1861, during the reign of Xianfeng Emperor (1851–1861).
