= South Suburban Park =

South Suburban Park, may refer to:

- South Suburban Park (Changsha), in Tianxin District of Changsha, Hunan, China
- South Suburban Park (Hengyang), in Yanfeng District of Hengyang, Hunan, China
- South Suburban Park (Chengdu), in Wuhou District of Chengdu, Sichuan, China
- South Suburban Park (Guiyang), in Guiyang, Guizhou, China
