= Yuelu =

Yuelu may refer to:

- Yuelu District, a district in Changsha, Hunan, China.
- Yuelu Academy, an educational institute of China
- Yuelu Mountain, a mountain in Hunan.
- Yuelü, the name for 22/7 (an approximation of the mathematical constant π) used by Zu Chongzhi
