= Guo Songtao =

Chinese diplomat and statesman

His Excellency Guo Songtao
- 郭嵩燾
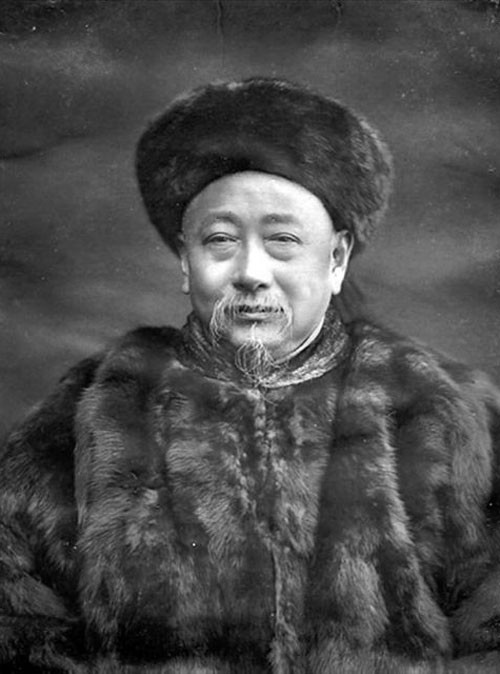

1st Chinese Ambassador to the United Kingdom
- In office 28 August 1875 – 25 August 1878
- Monarch: Guangxu
- Preceded by: Position established
- Succeeded by: Zeng Jize

1st Chinese Ambassador to France
- In office 22 February 1878 – 25 August 1878
- Monarch: Guangxu
- Preceded by: Position established
- Succeeded by: Zeng Jize

Personal details
- Born: 11 April 1818 Xiangyin, Hunan, Qing dynasty
- Died: 18 July 1891 (aged 73) Changsha, Hunan, Qing dynasty
- Education: Yuelu Academy
- Occupation: Diplomat

Guo Songtao (Chinese: 郭嵩焘; pinyin: Guō Sōngtāo; Wade–Giles: Kuo Sung-t’ao; 11 April 1818 – 18 July 1891) was a Chinese diplomat and statesman during the Qing dynasty. He was among the first foreign emissaries to be sent abroad by the Qing government, as a result of the Tongzhi Restoration.

== Early career ==
Guo was born in Xiangyin, Hunan in 1818. As a young man, Guo studied at the Yuelu Academy in Changsha, where he befriended Zeng Guofan. In 1847, Guo was awarded the highest degree in the imperial exams and soon afterwards he became a bachelor in the Hanlin Academy. In 1853, he was called to assist Zeng Guofan in joining the Xiang Army to suppress the Taiping Rebellion in their native province of Hunan. During the suppression of the Taipings Rebellion, Guo distinguished himself as a prominent advocate of the local likin tax as a means of financing the campaigns. In 1852 his forces recaptured Nanchang, Jiangxi from Taiping forces. He later also assisted Li Hongzhang's Huai Army in their campaigns against rebels in the Anhui province.

He called for foreign languages to be taught at a government school in 1859.

== Diplomatic service ==
Guo became an important member of China's Self-Strengthening Movement in the 1860s and 70s and distinguished himself for his advocacy of a moderate and peaceful foreign policy. Guo became the first Qing minister to be stationed in a western country. He served as Minister to Britain and Minister to France from 1877 through 1879 as part of the United Kingdom's demands after the Margary Affair for an Imperial commissioner to be posted to Britain. In 1877 the English artist Walter Goodman was commissioned to paint his portrait, exhibited that year at the Royal Academy and later at the Walker Art Gallery in Liverpool. The whereabouts of this painting is unknown but a photograph taken of it at the time is in a private collection in England.

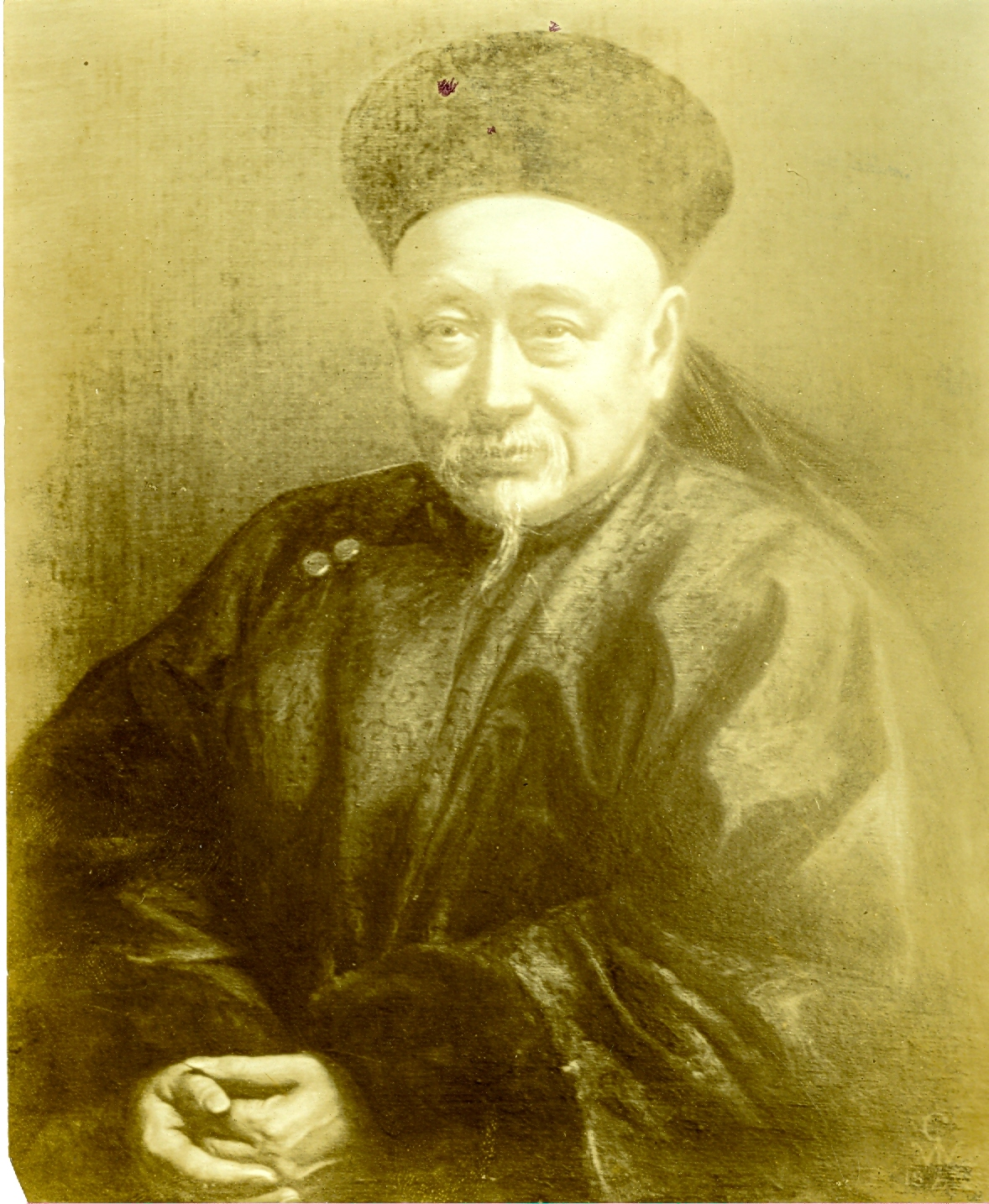
A Victorian photograph of Walter Goodman's 1877 portrait of Guo Songtao.

That same year, he authored his Shixi jicheng (使西紀程 Record of an envoy to the West), in which he expressed admiration for Western political institutions, writing that 'The kingdoms of Europe date back for some 2,000 years. Their governmental and educational systems are well-ordered, enlightened, and methodical'.

== Advocacy of Railways ==
In July 1877 while serving as Chinese Minister to Britain, Guo led an entourage of legation officials on a visit to the Ipswich engineering works of Ransomes and Rapier to see the manufacture of steam locomotives, railway equipment and other engineering products. He travelled from London to Ipswich by train and expressed his deep admiration for Britain's railway system, commenting that the distance travelled during the two-hour train journey would have taken two or three days in his own country.

He subsequently became a great proponent of railways and other modern engineering development in China, incurring the wrath of conservative and anti-railway Court officials, who resented his representations. In early 1878 he was also appointed Minister to France (concurrent with his British appointment) and moved to Paris, but in late 1878 he was ordered to return to China. His Shixi Jicheng was ordered burned by an imperial edict under pressure from the conservative Qingyi Movement. Upon his return, fearful for his life and under intimidation because of his pro-foreign views, he returned to his home province and virtually retired from public life, spending his time writing and teaching in an academy.

== See also ==
- List of diplomatic missions of the Qing dynasty

== Works ==
- 禮記質疑: 49卷 (1890)
- 使西紀程
