= Autumn-Admiring Pavilion =

Pavilion in Changsha, Hunan, China

- 爱晚亭
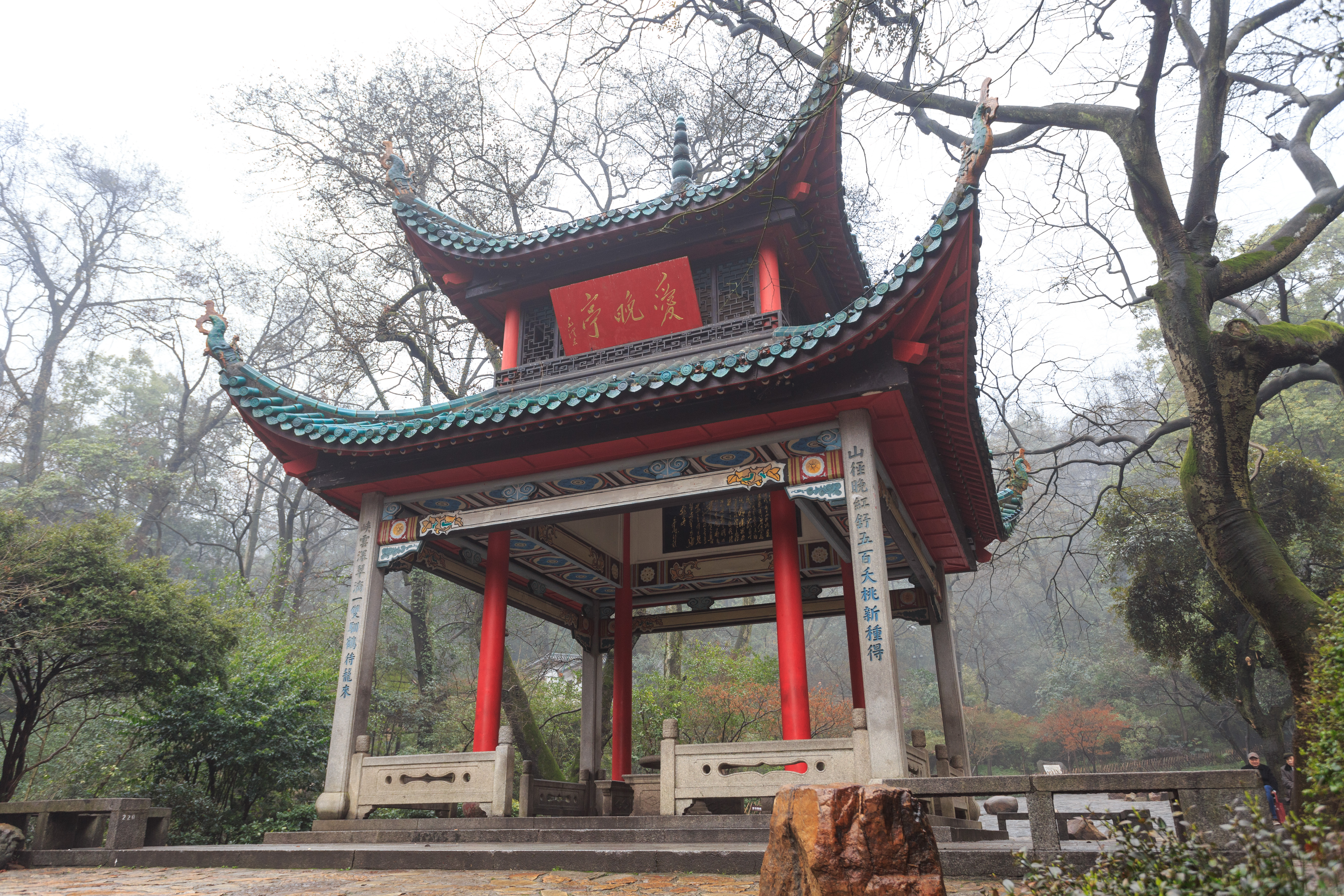
- Autumn-Admiring Pavilion.

- Location within Hunan

General information
- Type: Traditional Chinese Architecture
- Location: Mount Yuelu, Yuelu District, Changsha, Hunan, China
- Coordinates: 28°11′12″N 112°56′42″E
- Completed: 1792
- Renovated: 1952; 1987

Height
- Roof: Spire roof

Autumn-Admiring Pavilion or Aiwan Pavilion (simplified Chinese: 爱晚亭; traditional Chinese: 愛晚亭; pinyin: Àiwǎntíng) is a Chinese pavilion on Mount Yuelu, in Yuelu District, Changsha, Hunan. Alongside the Zuiweng Pavilion, Taoran Pavilion and Huxin Pavilion, it is one of the Four Great Pavilions of Jiangnan.

== History ==
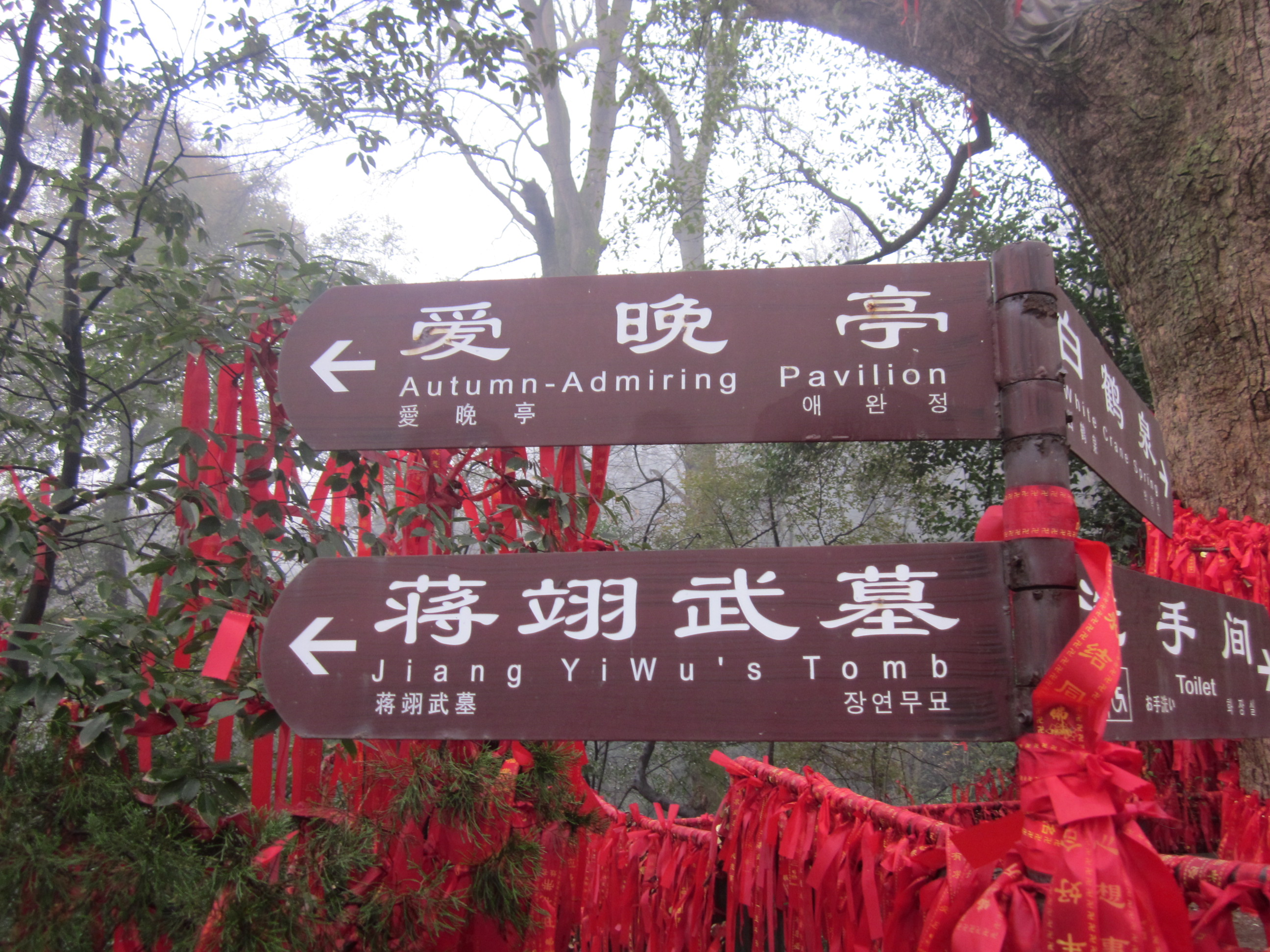
Road signs in Mount Yuelu. Turn right for "Toilet", and turn left for "Autumn-Admiring Pavilion" and "Jiang Yiwu's Tomb".

The Autumn-Admiring Pavilion was first constructed with the name of Red Leaves Pavilion (红叶亭) in 1792 in the reign of the Qianlong Emperor (1736–1796) by Luo Dian, the then president of Yuelu Academy. And later Bi Yuan (1730–1797), Viceroy of Huguang, changed its name to Autumn-Admiring Pavilion. It is cited from the verses of that "I stop my carriage to admire the maple trees at nightfall, whose frosty leaves are redder than the flowers of early spring." (停车坐爱枫林晚，霜叶红于二月花) by Tang dynasty (618–907) poet Du Mu (803–852).

When Mao Zedong studied at Hunan First Normal University, he frequented the area with his friends.

During the Second Sino-Japanese War (1937–1945), the pavilion was devastated by the Imperial Japanese Army.

After the establishment of the Communist State in 1952, the government of Hunan reconstructed the pavilion. In 1987, the pavilion was completely restored by the government. The pavilion has been designated among the seventh group of "Major National Historical and Cultural Sites in Hunan" by the State Council of China in 2013.

== Architecture ==
The current Autumn-Admiring Pavilion is of pure stone structure. The roof is covered with green glazed tiles. It has two layers of overhanging eaves, eight granite hypostyle columns in the pavilion. Right above the pavilion, there is a big caissons (藻井). In the center of the second floor of the pavilion is a red stele, on which there are the words "Autumn-Admiring Pavilion" (爱晚亭), written by Mao Zedong in 1952. The stone is engraved with a couplet in Chinese characters: "山径晚红舒，五百夭桃新种得；峡云深翠滴，一双驯鹤待笼来".

Acer palmatum in autumn is a major attraction of Autumn-Admiring Pavilion.
