= South Suburban Park (Changsha) =

Park in Changsha, Hunan, China

- 南郊公园
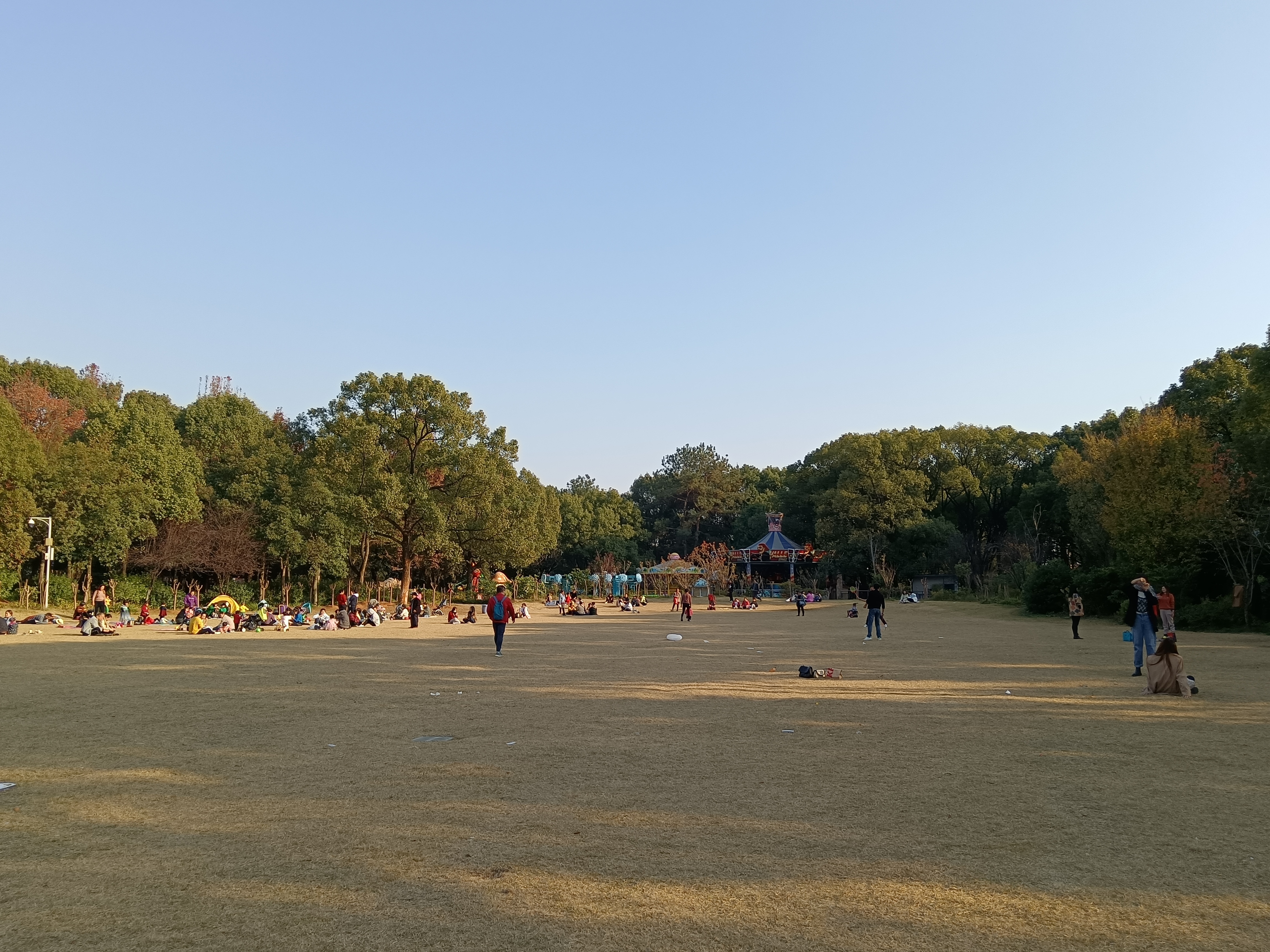
- South Suburban Park, Changsha, Hunan, China

- Location within Hunan
- Type: Public park, urban park
- Location: Tianxin District of Changsha, Hunan
- Coordinates: 28°08′42.27″N 112°57′33.44″E
- Area: 0.365-square-kilometre (0.141 sq mi)
- Created: 1958
- Founder: Changsha Municipal People's Government
- Status: All year

Chinese name
- Simplified Chinese: 南郊公园
- Traditional Chinese: 南郊公園
Transcriptions
Standard Mandarin
- Hanyu Pinyin: Nánjiāo Gōngyuán

South Suburban Park (Chinese: 南郊公园) is a mountainous urban park located in Tianxin District of Changsha, Hunan, China. Situated adjacent to the Xiang River and facing Yuelu Mountain across the water, it spans approximately 0.365-square-kilometre (0.141 sq mi) and is renowned for its lush forest coverage, which reaches 93.7%, earning it the nickname "Green Pearl of the East Xiang River".

== History ==
The South Suburban Park is where young Mao Zedong commanded his first military battle and achieved victory, historically known as the "Monkey Stone Initial Military Engagement".

Originally planned in 1958 as "Bridge End Park" (桥头公园; 橋頭公園; Qiáotóu Gōngyuán), it was later converted into the Nanjiao Nursery (南郊苗圃; Nánjiāo Miáopǔ). The park officially opened to the public on 1 May 1986, and has been free to enter since 2009.

== Key Attractions ==
=== Eight Scenic Spots ===
- Twin Pavilions Reflecting Elegance (双亭映秀; 雙亭映秀; Shuāngtíng Yìngxiù): two pavilions mirrored in the Manzhu Lake (漫竹湖; Mànzhú Hú), creating a picturesque blend of architecture and nature.
- Bamboo Garden with Murmuring Springs (竹苑听泉; Zhúyuàn Tīngquán): a tranquil valley featuring bamboo groves, streams, and a stone waterfall, centered around the Qingyin Pavilion (清音阁; 清音閣; Qīngyīn Gé).
- Rhododendrons Herald Spring (杜鹃报春; 杜鵑報春; Dùjuān Bàochūn): a 5,000-square-metre (54,000 sq ft) garden filled with diverse rhododendron species that bloom vibrantly in spring.
- Ganlu Waterfall (甘露飞珠; 甘露飛珠; Gānlù Fēizhū): a dragon-headed spring spouting crystal-clear water in the Imperial Dragon Spring Courtyard.
- Xiufeng Moonlit Lawn (秀峰醉月; Xiùfēng Zuìyuè): a sprawling 10,000-square-metre (110,000 sq ft) lawn surrounded by cherry trees, red maples, and the Rhine Cottage" ideal for moonlit strolls.
- Hongge Pavilion Amidst Foliage (高阁数红; 高閣數紅; Gāogé Shǔhóng): Shuhong Pavilion (数红阁; 數紅閣; Shǔhóng Gé) atop the western hill, offering panoramic views of the Xiang River, Orange Isle, and the city skyline.
- River-Sky Vista ((江天一揽; 江天一攬; Jiāngtiān Yīlǎn): an observation deck extending over the Xiang River, providing unobstructed views of water and sky.
- Nature Fun Paradise (天趣乐园; 天趣樂園; Tiānqù Lèyuán): a green valley featuring recreational facilities like rope bridges and forest climbs.

=== Recreational Facilities ===
- Car Theater: home to Hunan's largest outdoor drive-in cinema, with an 8×18-meter screen and immersive audio.
- Amusement Rides: includes Ferris wheels, bumper cars, pirate ships, and roller skating rinks.
- Sports and Leisure: basketball courts, table tennis tables, and fitness centers cater to active visitors.

=== Cultural and Ecological Initiatives ===
- The park hosts a "Natural Memory Conservation Base" and was designated as a "Professional Science Popularization Venue" in 2024. It organizes eco-education activities, including bird-watching, dinosaur exhibitions, and forest libraries.
- Annual events like the "National Tide Lantern Festival" and "Intangible Cultural Heritage Celebration" attract thousands of visitors.
