= Yan Ruyi =

Chinese scholar

Yan Ruyi (Chinese: 嚴如熤) (1759–1826) was an independent gentry scholar of considerable local influence in Western Hunan, Southern China during the Qing dynasty. A child prodigy, he studied at the Yuelu Academy in Changsha. In 1795, Yan Ruyi was involved in a debacle in which he organized a group of Gelao to defend against the raging Miao Rebellion (1795–1797). A Qing government force mistook the Gelao for enemies and crushed the independent force. Yan Ruyi returned to his hometown in disgrace.

He later became famous for his contributions to frontier studies including Miaofang beilan, Yangfang jiyao, and Sansheng bianfang beilan. His model of making connections between government forces and certain friendly native peoples was used to great effect later during the White Lotus Rebellion and the Taiping Rebellion.
