= Yunlu Palace =

Taoist temple in Changsha, China

- 云麓宫
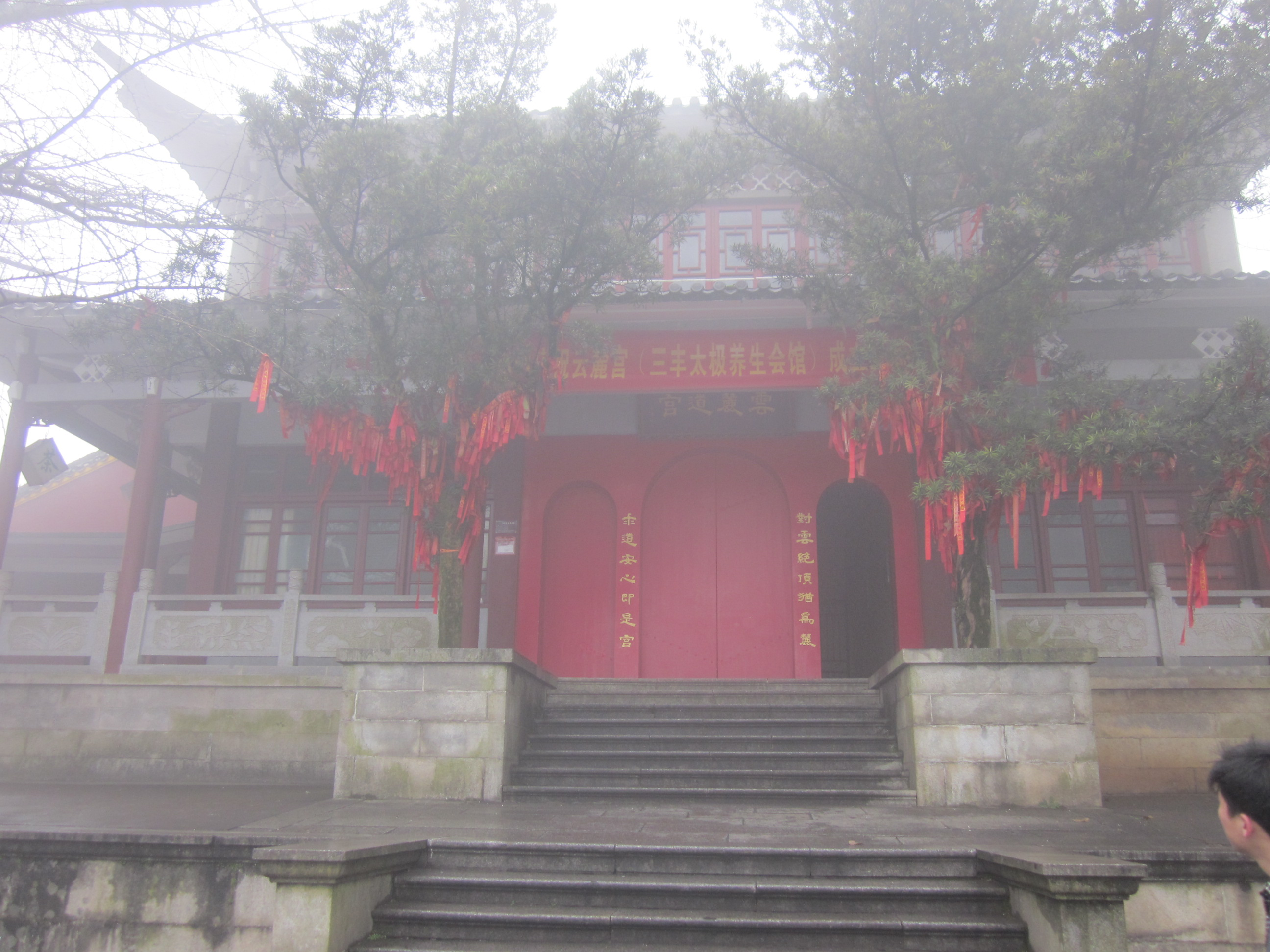
- Main hall

- Location within Hunan Location within China

Religion
- Affiliation: Taoism
- Deity: Three Pure Ones

Location
- Location: Yuelu Mountain, Changsha, Hunan 28°11′00″N 112°56′24″E
- Country: China
- Interactive map of Yunlu Palace

Architecture
- Founder: Zhu Jianjun
- Completed: 1478

Yunlu Palace (simplified Chinese: 云麓宫; traditional Chinese: 雲麓宮; pinyin: Yúnlù Gōng) is a Taoist temple located on the south side of Yuelu Mountain, in Yuelu District of Changsha, Hunan, China. It was originally built in 1478, but because of war has been rebuilt numerous times since then, with the last major one done in 1976.

== History ==
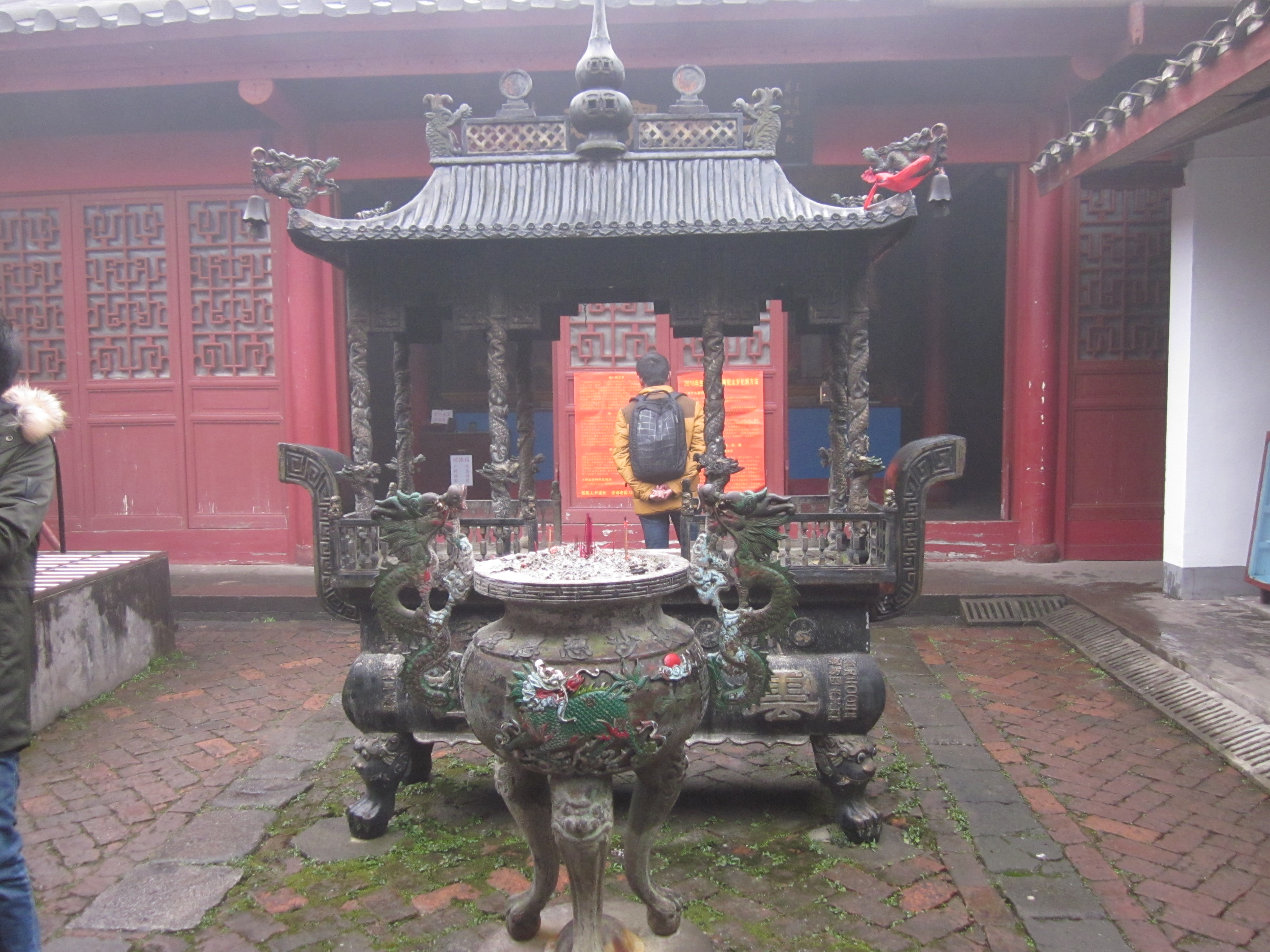
Yunlu Palace.

=== Ming dynasty ===
It was first built by Vassal King Zhu Jianjun (朱見浚) in the Ming dynasty (1368–1644) during the reign of Chenghua Emperor, in the fourteenth year of Chenghua Era (1465–1487). At that time it bore the name Dongzhen Guan (洞真觀). During the reign of Jiajing Emperor (1522–1566), Changsha prefecture chief Sun Fu (孫復) ordered Taoist priest Li Kejing (李可經) to rebuild the temple. In the period of the Longqing Emperor (1567–1572), Taoist priest Jin Shoufen (金守分) and Zhang Yanghe (張陽和) extended the temple. In the late Ming dynasty, it was destroyed by fire during the Manchu invasion.

=== Qing dynasty ===
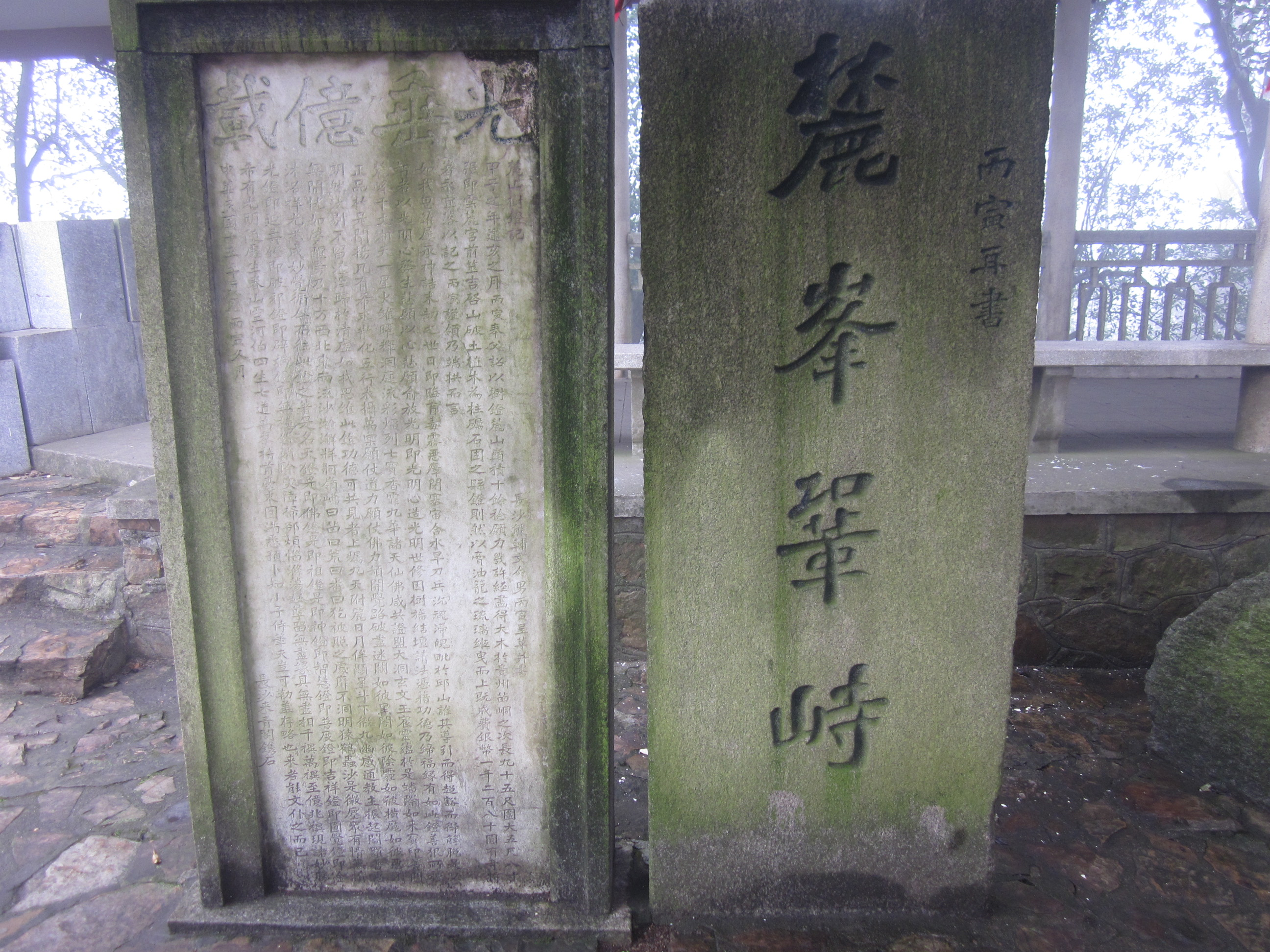
The stele "Towering Peak of Mt. Yuelu". (麓峰巩峙碑文)

During the reign of the Kangxi Emperor (1662–1722), local official Zhang Rui (張睿) rebuilt the temple. In the period of the Qianlong Emperor (1736–1795), the temple consisted of five buildings. In 1852, in the second year of the age of Xianfeng of Xianfeng Emperor (1381–1861), it was destroyed by the Taiping Heavenly Kingdom army. In 1863, in the second year of Tongzhi Era of Tongzhi Emperor (1856–1875), the temple was rebuilt by a Wudang Taoist priest Xiang Jiaohui (向教輝).

=== Republic of China ===
In 1944, the temple was broken down when the Japanese planes bombed Changsha city. Two years later, it was rebuilt by Taoist priest Wu Yunkai (鄔雲開) and Wu Minghai (吳明海).

=== People's Republic of China ===
After the establishment of the Communist State, the Changsha government rebuilt it in 1957. In 1966, Mao Zedong launched the Cultural Revolution, the Red Guards attacked the temple. In 1976, the local government reopened and renovated the temple.

== Architecture ==
=== Stele ===
The stele "Towering Peak of Mt. Yuelu" (麓峰巩峙碑文; 麓峯鞏峙碑文) with 178m in height and 0.74 in width, is inscribed with "Light as Bright as That of the Yizhen Constellation" (光联翼轸; 光聯翼軫). The stele was fixed in 1927.

=== Stone fence ===
The stone fence, is engraved with more than five thousand names of the Nationalists whom died in the Second Sino-Japanese War (1937 - 1945).
