= Lushan Temple =

Buddhist temple in Changsha, China

- 麓山寺
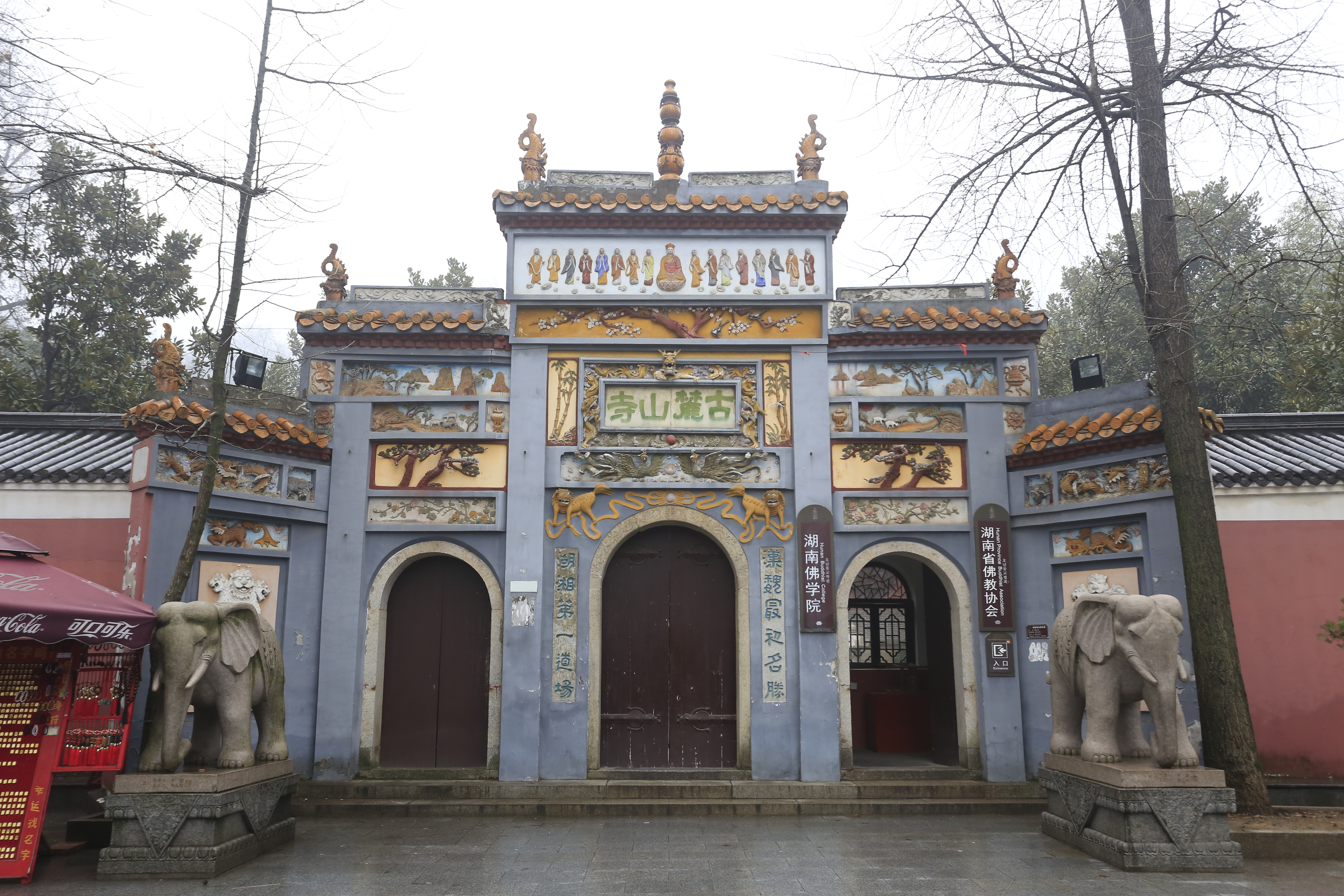
- Shanmen.

- Location within Hunan Location within China

Religion
- Affiliation: Buddhism
- Sect: Chan

Location
- Location: Yuelu Mountain, Changsha, Hunan
- Country: China
- Coordinates: 28°11′02″N 112°55′44″E

Architecture
- Founder: Zhu Fachong
- Completed: AD 268

Lushan Temple (Chinese: 麓山寺; pinyin: Lùshān Sì), is a Buddhist temple at Yuelu Mountain, Changsha, Hunan, China. It includes the Entrance, Hall of Great Heroes, Zazen room, and dining room, etc.

== History ==
=== Jin dynasty ===
In 268, in the fourth year of the Taishi era of Emperor Wu of Jin, Zhu Fachong (竺法崇) built the Hui Guangming Temple (慧光明寺). It was the first temple in Hunan. After Zhu Fachong, the eminent monks Fadao (法导) and Famin (法愍) served as Abbot.

=== Sui dynasty ===
In 589, in the ninth year of the Kaihuang era of Emperor Wen of Sui, Zhiyi (智顗) came to Hui Guangming Temple, explained the Lotus Sutra and taught Buddhism. In 602, he built a pagoda to preserve śarīra (relics) of the Buddha.

=== Tang dynasty ===
In the early Tang dynasty, the monk renamed it Lushan Temple (麓山寺).Shenhui's disciple Mohe Yanna (摩诃衍那) came to Lushan Temple to advertise Folk Buddhism.

In 845, after the Great Anti-Buddhist Persecution, Lushan Temple was broken down.

In 847, in the first year of the age of Dazhong of Emperor Xuanzong, Jingcen (景岑禅师) rebuilt temple and named it Luyuan (麓苑).Men of letters and poets came to here to chant poems and paint pictures.

=== Yuan dynasty ===
In Yuan dynasty, Lushan Temple was broken down by Mongolian Army, it abandoned in one handred and fifty years.

=== Ming dynasty ===
In the period of the Chenghua Emperor, the monks and the government rebuilt Lushan Temple.

In the period of the Wanli Emperor, Miaoguang (妙光禅师) rebuilt a main hall, a Buddhism goddess Guanyin hall and the depositary of Buddhist texts. The Wanli Emperor renamed it Wanshou Temple (万寿寺).

In the late Ming dynasty, Hanshan Deqing came to Wanshou Temple to advertise Folk Buddhism.

In 1643, in the sixteenth year of the age of the Chongzhen Emperor, Wanshou Temple was broken down by the Qing army.

=== Qing dynasty ===
In 1658, in the fifteenth year of the age of the Shunzhi Emperor, the abbots Zhitan (智檀), Wenxing (文惺) and the government rebuilt Wanshou Temple. Monk poets Zhitan, Wenxing, Misong (弥嵩), Tianfang (天放) and Liyun (笠云) lived in here.

=== Republic of China ===
In the early Republic of China, the monks renamed the temple Old Lushan Temple (古麓山寺).During the Second Sino-Japanese War, Gu Lushan Temple was bombed by a Japanese plane.

=== People's Republic of China ===
In 1966, in the Cultural Revolution, only seven monks lived in Lushan temple.

In 1983, the People's Government of Changsha rebuilt it. It was listed as a China's most important temple in the buddhism of Han areas.

In 2013, Lushan Temple was free and open to the public from May 10.

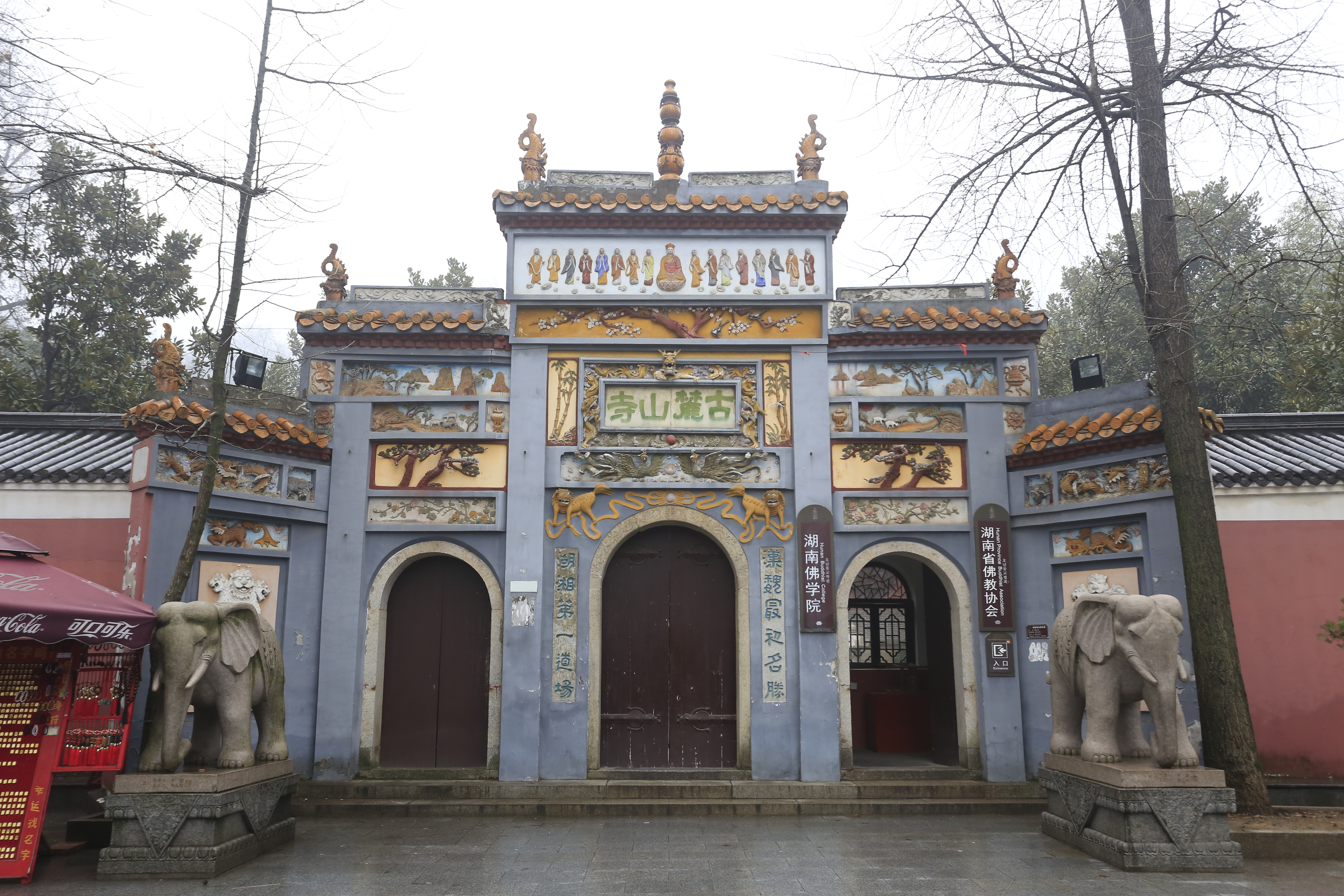
Gate

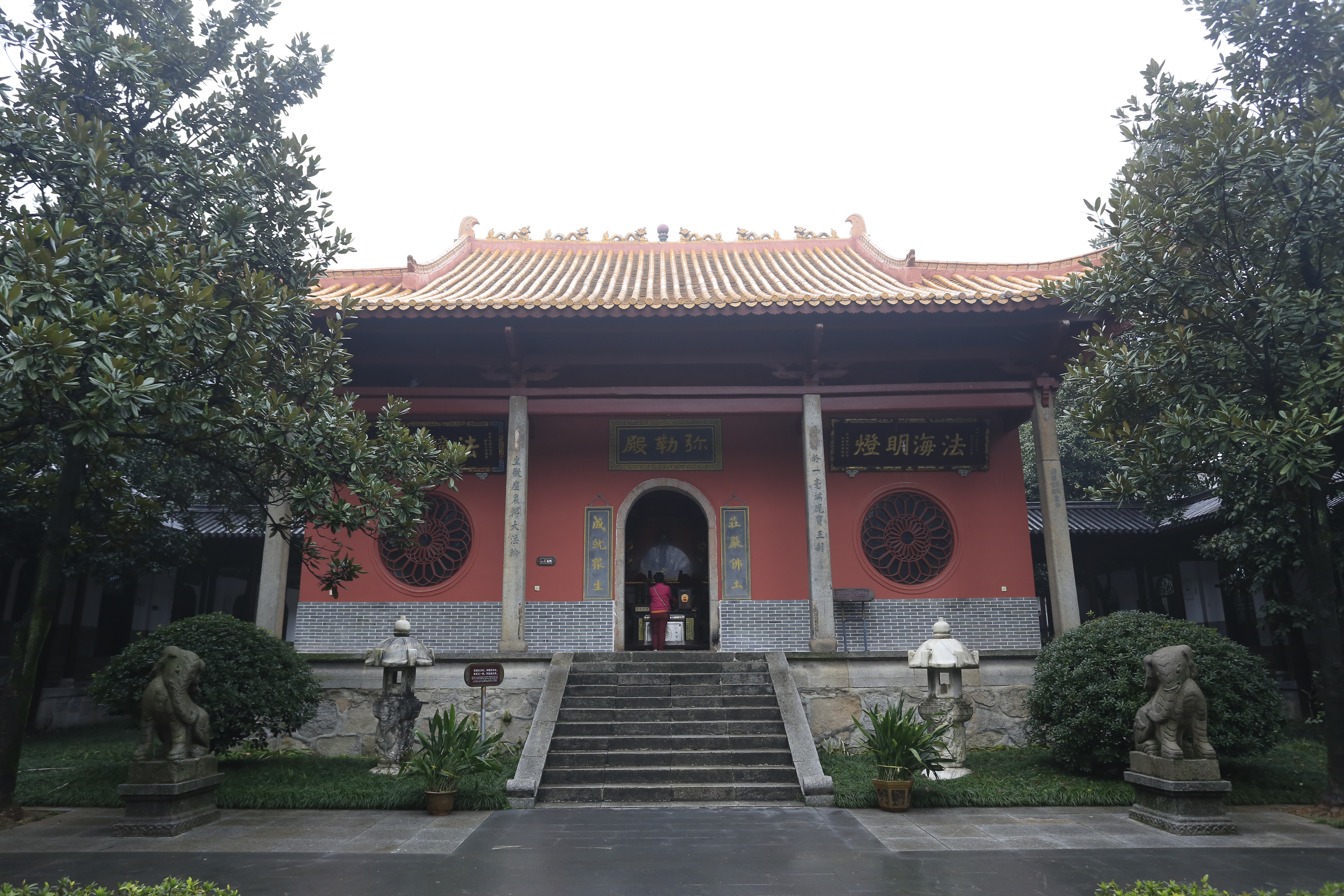
Maitreya hall

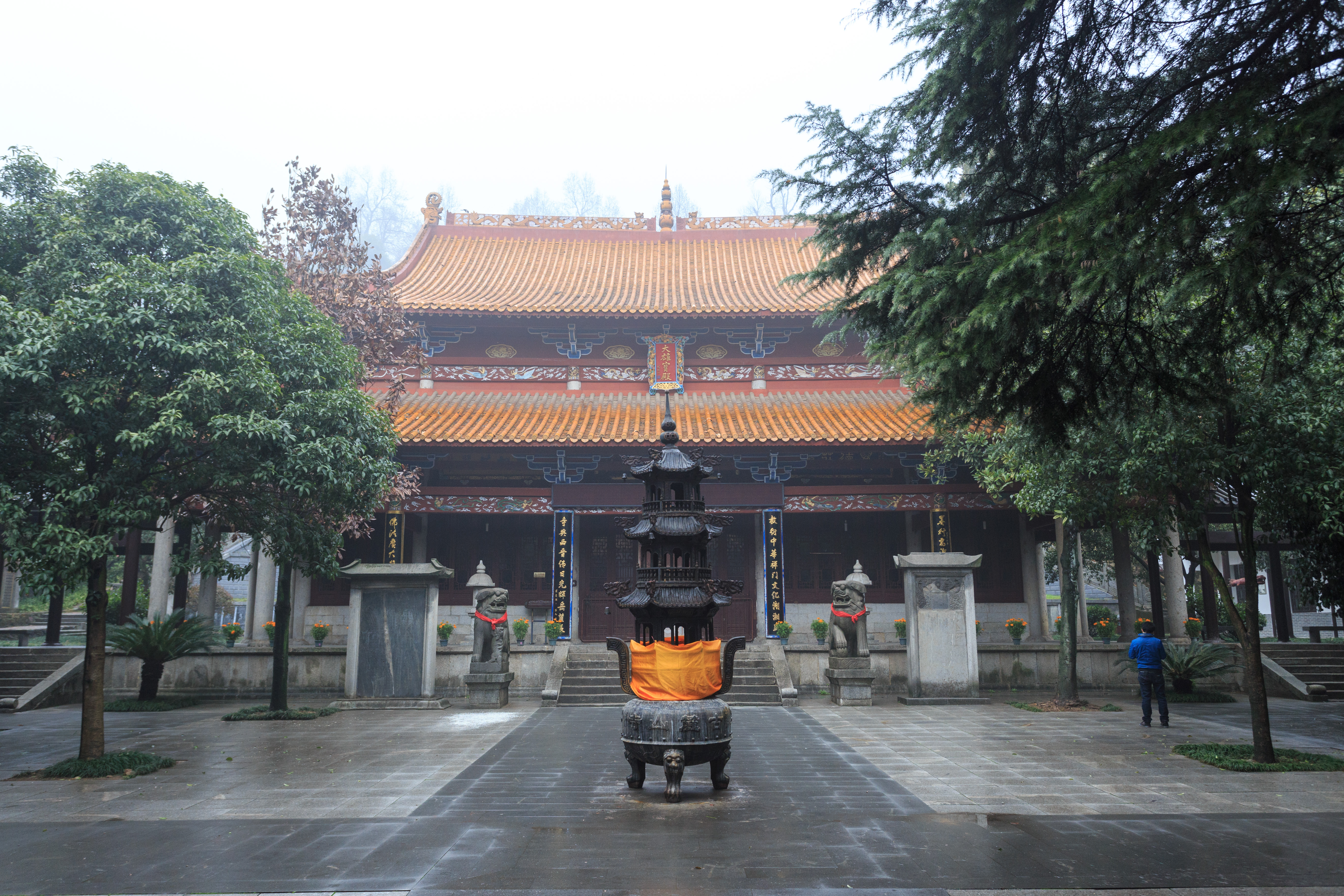
Mahavira hall

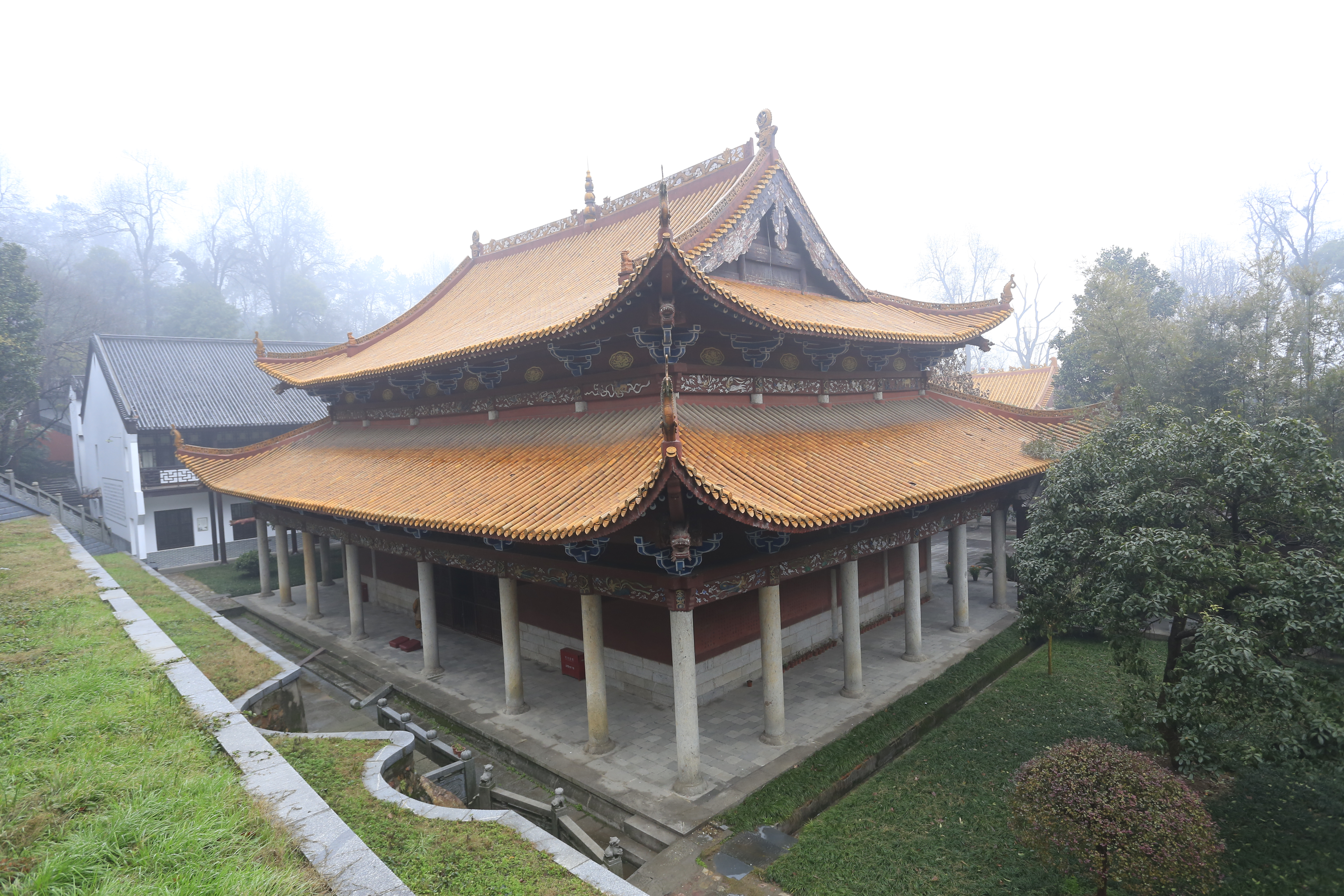
Mahavira hall

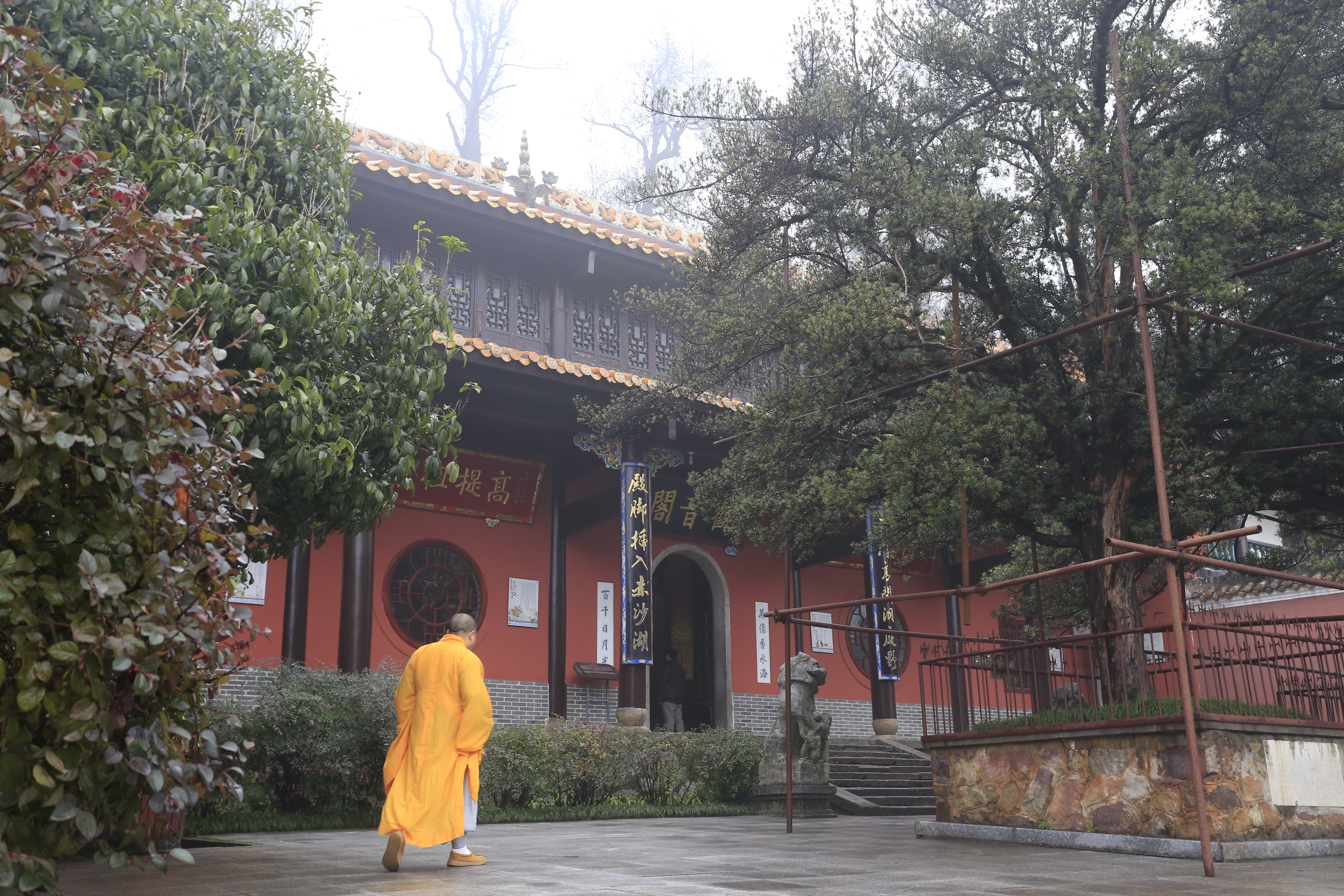
Guanyin hall

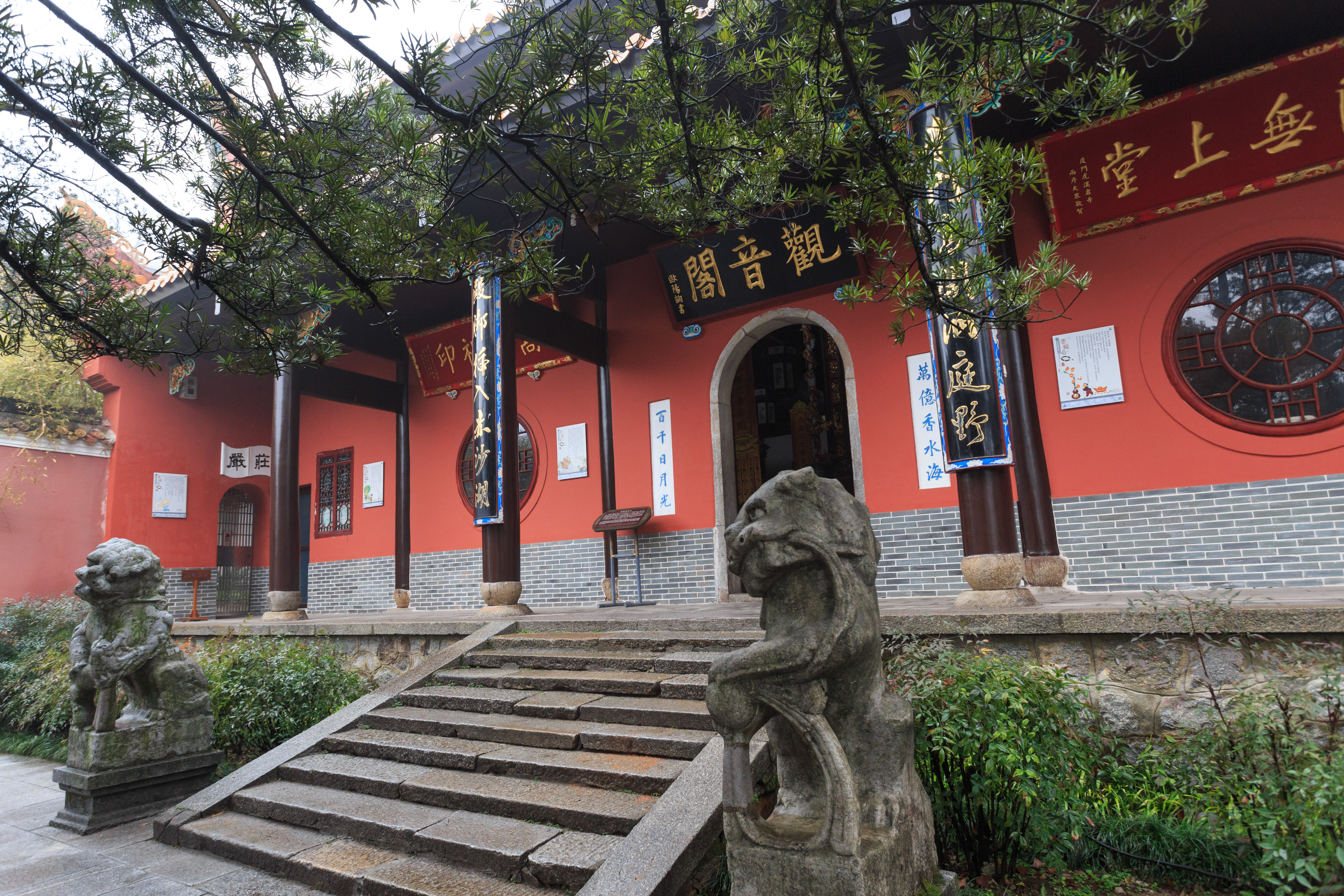
Guanyin hall

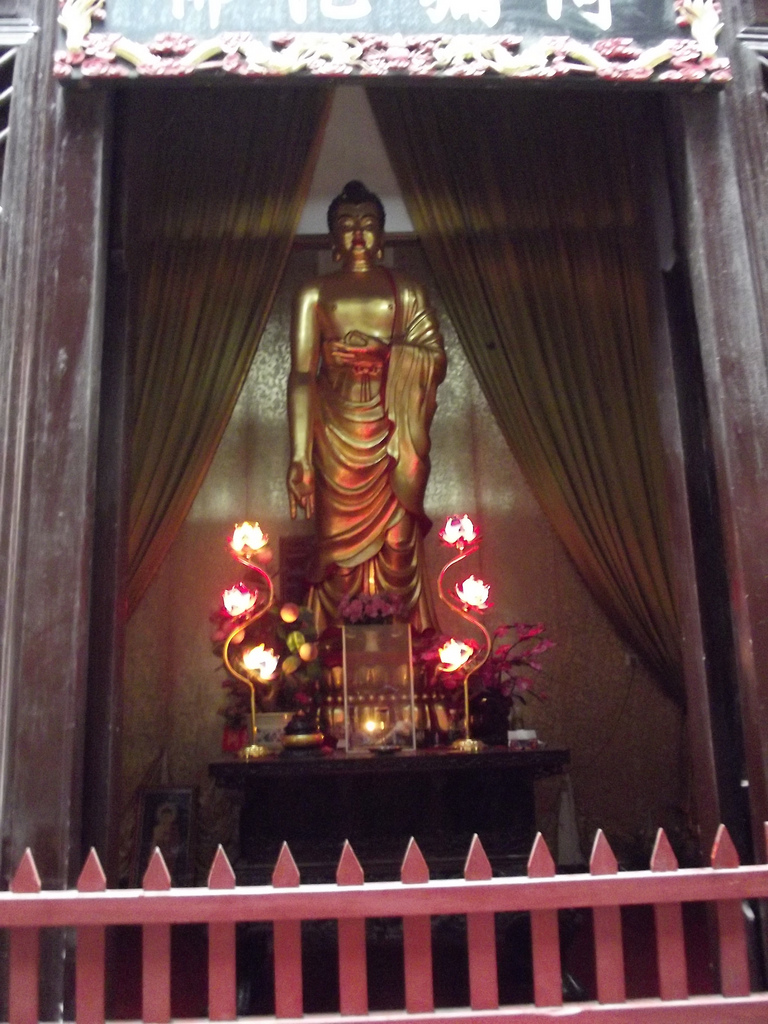
Buddha Tathāgata

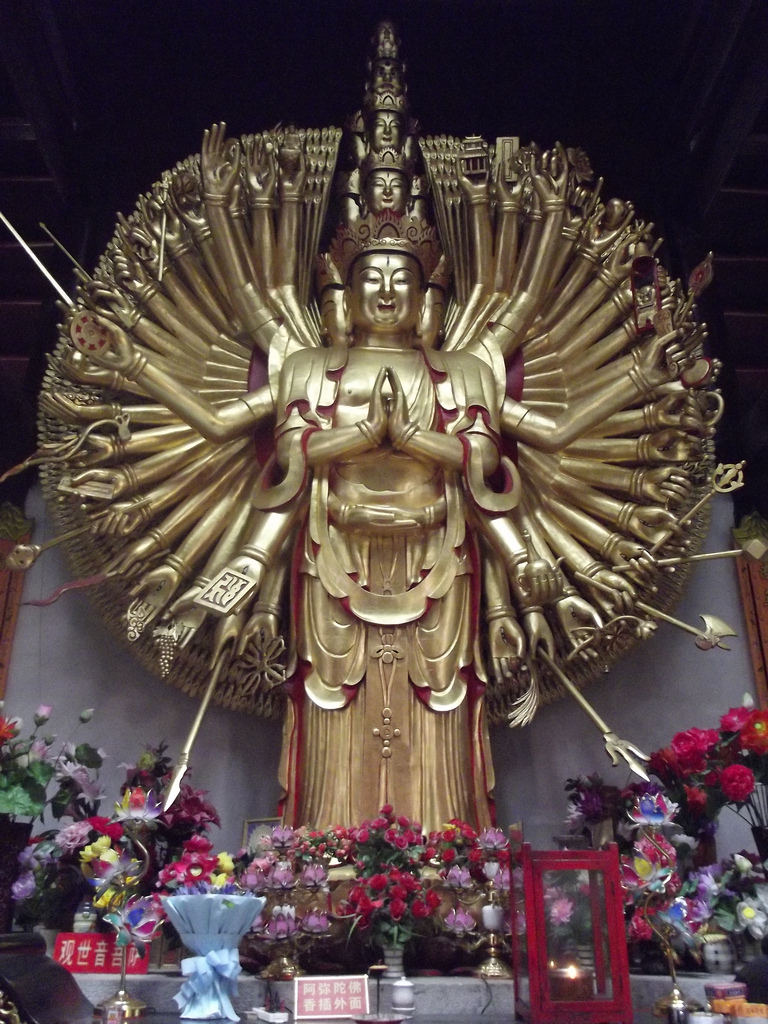
Thousands Hands Guanyin.

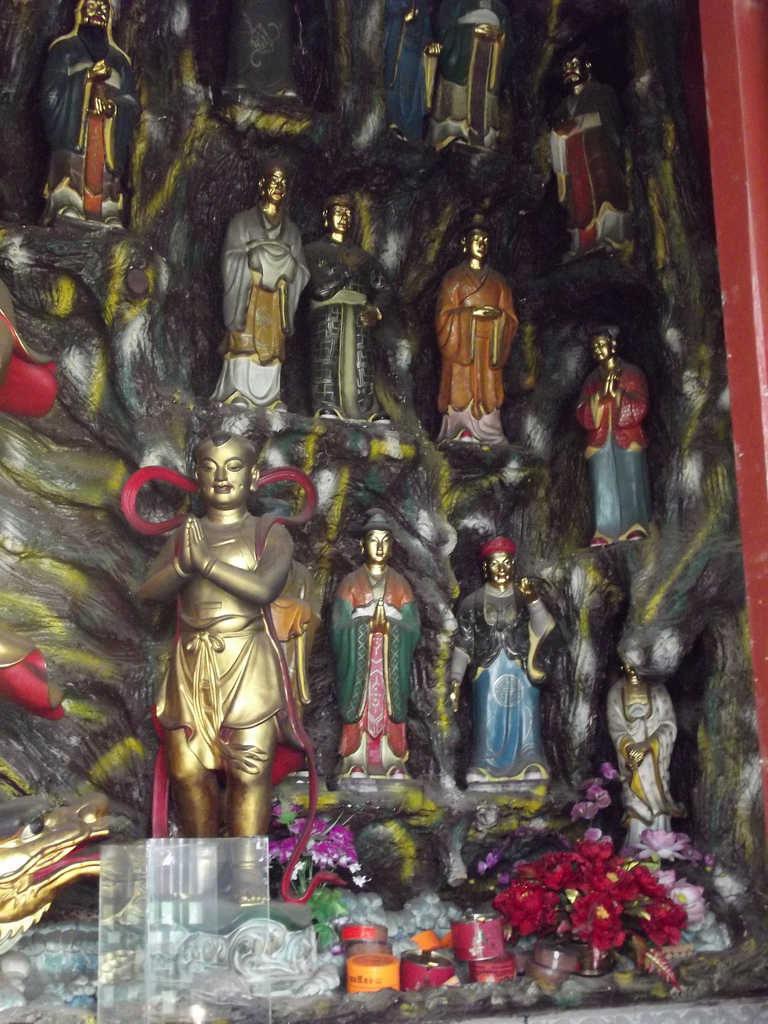
Arhat and Bhante.
