= Qingyi, Sichuan =

Qingyi 青义镇
- Town
- Location in Sichuan
- Coordinates: 31°31′42″N 104°42′15″E
- Country: People's Republic of China
- Province: Sichuan
- Prefecture-level city: Mianyang
- District: Fucheng District
- Time zone: UTC+8 (China Standard)

Qingyi (simplified Chinese: 青义; traditional Chinese: 青義; pinyin: Qīngyì) is a town in Fucheng District, Mianyang, Sichuan province, China. As of 2020, it has 3 residential neighborhoods and 12 villages under its administration.

Neighborhoods

- Dengta Community (灯塔社区)
- Longmen Community (龙门社区)
- Jinjialin Community (金家林社区)

Villages

- Yulong Village (玉龙村)
- Dalong Village (大龙村)
- Mianxing Village (绵兴村)
- Qingyang Village (青羊村)
- Xiaoqiao Village (小桥村)
- Longfeng Village (龙峰村)
- Qianjin Village (前进村)
- Xiangji Village (香脊村)
- Gejiamiao Village (戈家庙村)
- Gulou Village (鼓楼村)
- Daxin Village (大新村)
- Xiyuan Village (西园村)

== See also ==
- List of township-level divisions of Sichuan
