= Qingyi River (Henan) =

- Native name: 清潩河 (Chinese)

Location
- Country: China

Physical characteristics
- Source: Xuchang
- Mouth: Ying River
  - location: Xuchang, Henan, China
  - coordinates: 33°46′22″N 114°17′09″E
- Length: 149 km (93 mi)

The Qingyi River (Chinese: 清潩河; pinyin: Qīngyì Hé) is a tributary of the Ying River in Henan province, China.
