= South Suburban Park (Hengyang) =

Park in Hengyang, Hunan, China

- 南郊公园
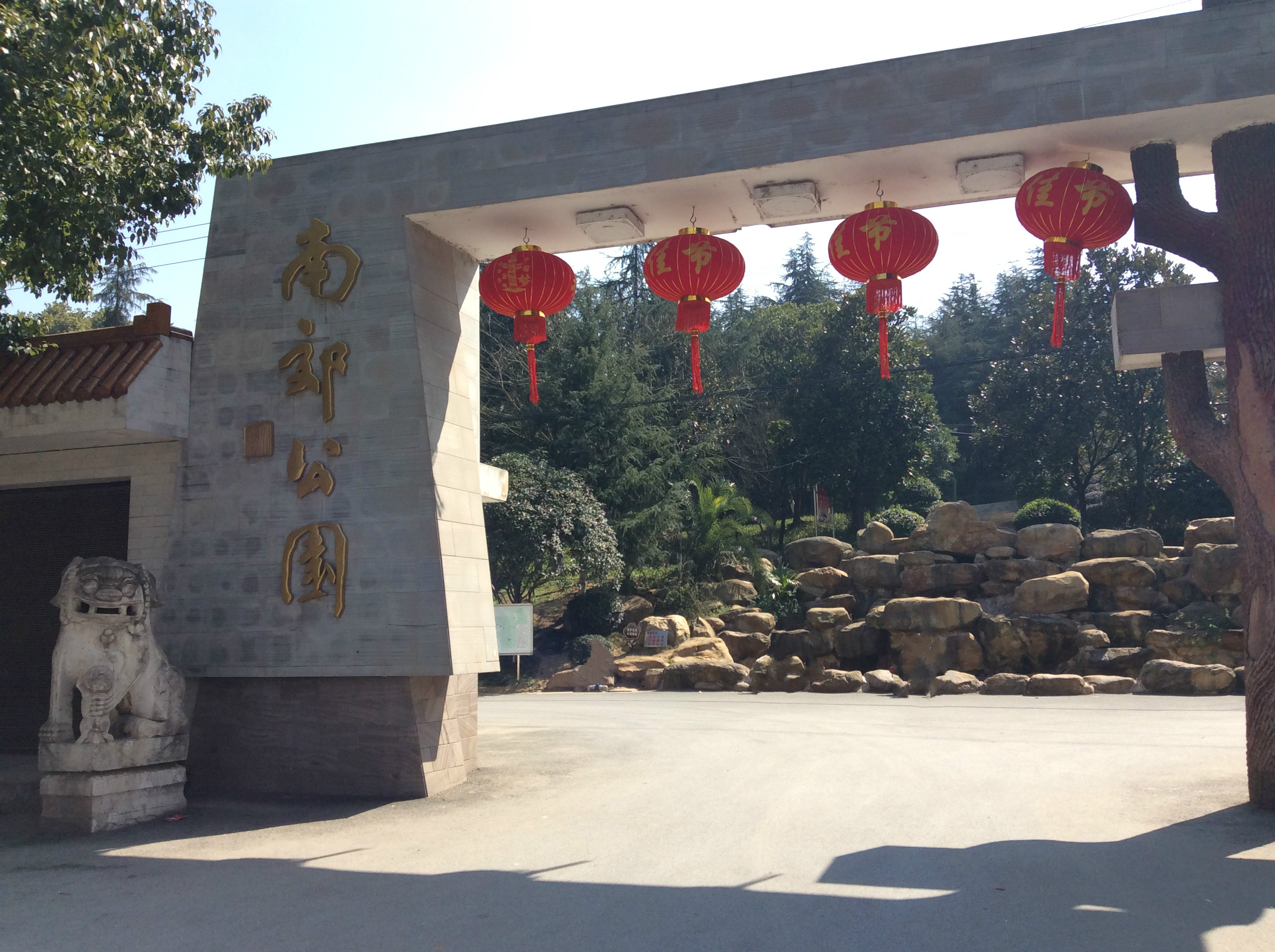
- Southern Entrance

- Location within Hunan
- Type: Public park, urban park
- Coordinates: 26°52′N 112°38′E
- Area: 0.4-square-kilometre (0.15 sq mi)
- Created: 1992
- Status: Open all year

Chinese name
- Simplified Chinese: 南郊公园
- Traditional Chinese: 南郊公園
Transcriptions
Standard Mandarin
- Hanyu Pinyin: Nánjiāo Gōngyuán

South Suburban Park (Chinese: 南郊公园) is a public park located in Yanfeng District of Hengyang, Hunan, China.

== History ==
South Suburban Park was established in 1992 as part of Hengyang's urban development initiatives. It was designed to provide a natural retreat and has since become a popular destination for leisure and outdoor activities. Over the years, the park has undergone several renovations to enhance its facilities and ecological environment.

== Geography ==
=== Geology ===
South Suburban Park is situated in a region characterized by hilly terrain and red soil, typical of the Hunan Basin.

=== Climate ===
South Suburban Park experiences a humid subtropical climate, with hot, humid summers and mild, relatively dry winters. Annual precipitation averages around 1,300-to-1,500-millimetre (51 to 59 in) .

=== Flora and fauna ===
South Suburban Park features diverse vegetation, including broad-leaved evergreen trees, bamboo groves, ginkgo trees, and seasonal flowers such as camellias and osmanthus.

Common wildlife includes songbirds, squirrels, and butterflies. The park's ponds may also support species like carp and pond turtles.

== Main Attractions ==
Central Lake: a scenic water body where visitors can enjoy boating and view aquatic plants.

Botanical Garden: showcases a variety of local and ornamental plants.

Walking Trails: paved paths that wind through wooded areas and gardens.

Children's Playground: equipped with modern play facilities.

Viewing Pavilion: traditional Chinese pavilion offering panoramic views of the park.

== Gallery ==
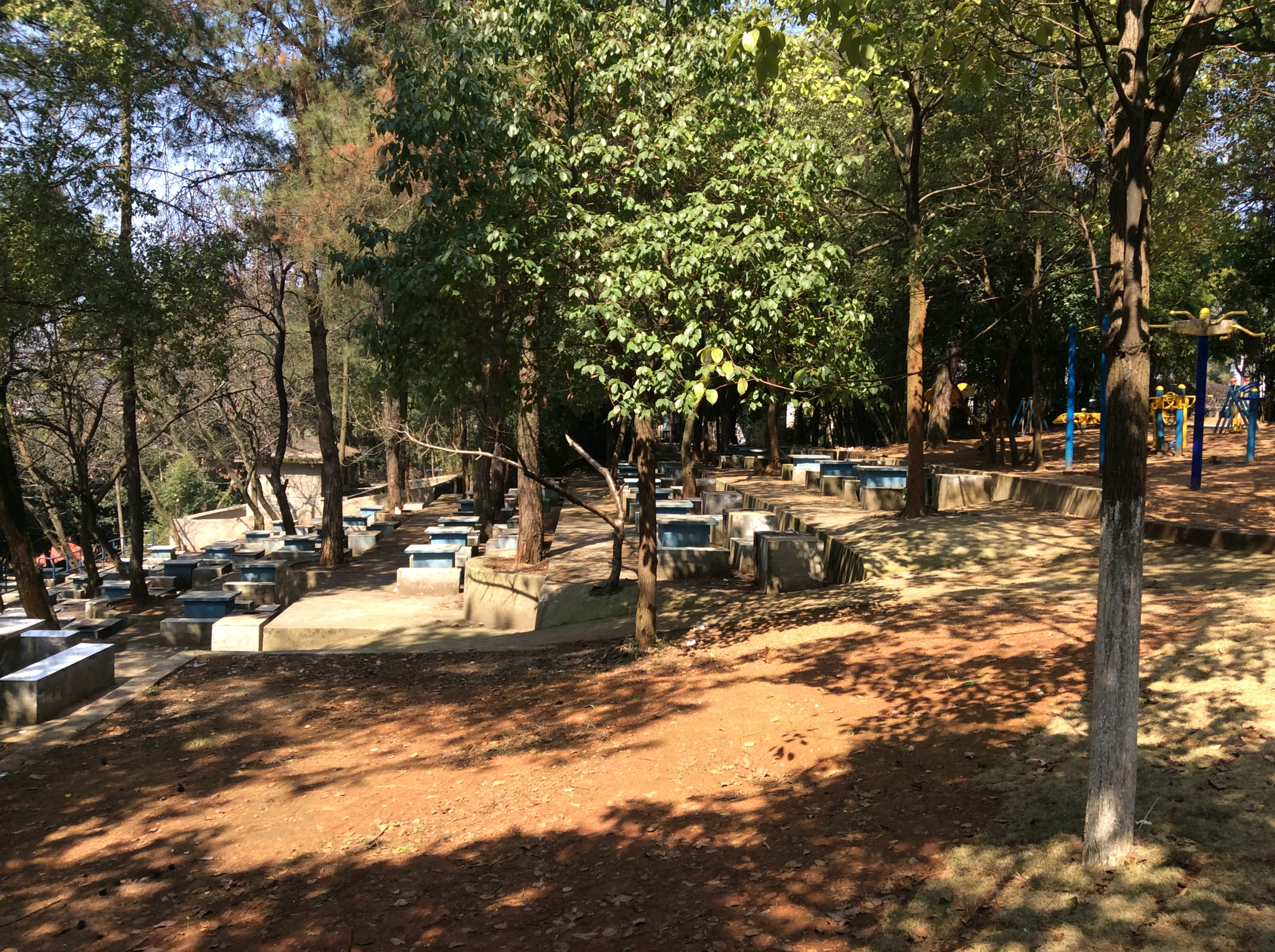
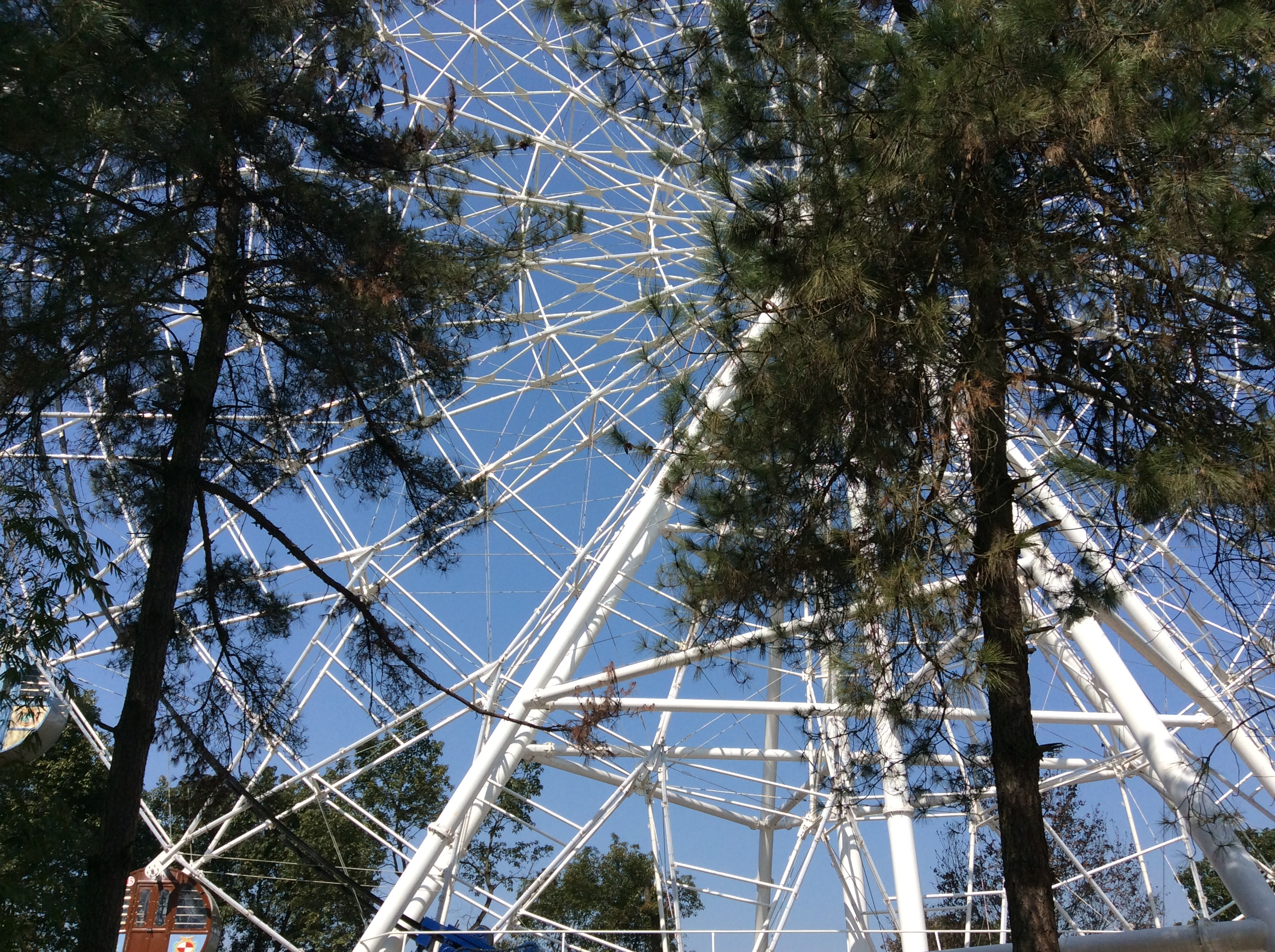
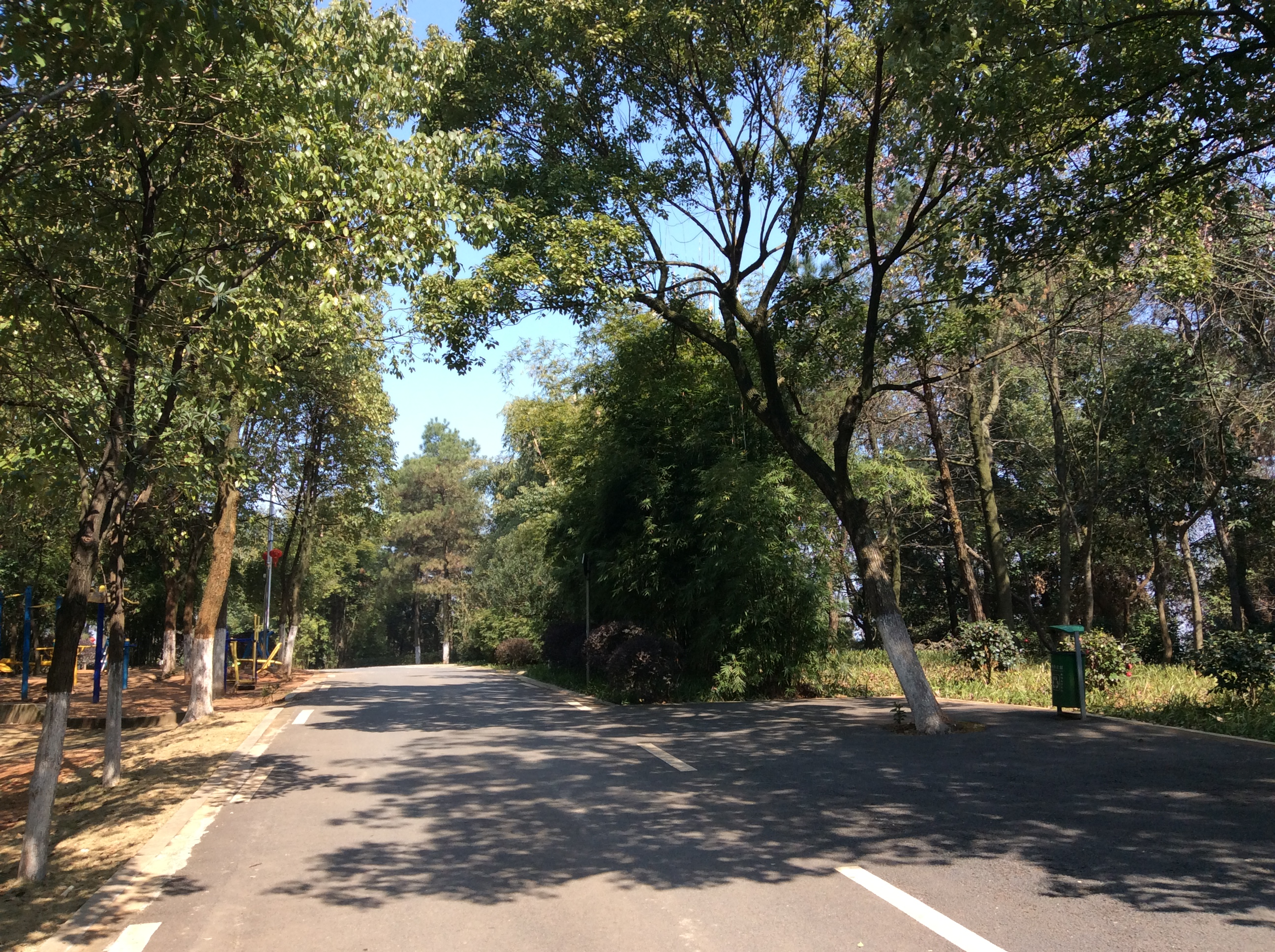
