= Qingyi Movement =

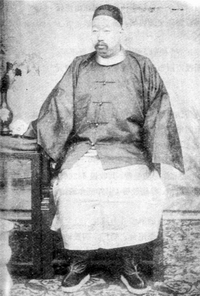
- Zhang Peilun a leader of the anti-foreign Qingyi party. His Fujian Fleet was annihilated by the French in 1884.
- Chinese: 清义
Transcriptions
Standard Mandarin
- Hanyu Pinyin: qīngyì
- Wade–Giles: ch'ing-i

Qingyi (Chinese: 清义; pinyin: Qīngyì) was a form of political expression used to oppose the policies of the Chinese imperial government. It involved intellectuals criticizing officials in terms of Confucian morals. The practice can be traced backed to Eastern Han dynasty. It was widespread during the Ming dynasty. A literal translation of the phrase is "pure discussion."

In a modern context, the phrase qingyi refers to a group of officials who opposed Li Hongzhang and the Self-Strengthening Movement of the 1860s and 1870s. Zhang Zhidong (1837 – 1909), Zhang Peilun (1848 – 1903), and Weng Tonghe (1830 – 1904) belonged to this group. The movement was a form of anti-foreignism.

Li emphasized the adoption of Western manufacturing techniques and complained of the irresponsible talk of the qingyi. He dismissed them as a group without practical experience. Yet Zhang Zhidong was a prominent official.

Zhang's role is a subject of dispute among scholars. John K. Fairbank classified him as a Confucian conservative based on his ti-yong (Chinese: 體用; pinyin: tǐ-yòng), or “structure-use” thesis. Zhang held, “Chinese learning as the fundamental structure, western learning for practical use.” Yet Zhang's province-level military reforms, including the Guangdong Military Academy (1885), the Guangdong Victorious Army (1885), and the Hubei Military Academy (1896) were models for an empire-wide reform that was adopted in 1902. The Wuchang garrison that led the 1911 revolution was a unit modernized by Zhang.

More recent scholarship does not stress the ti-yong distinction, but rather questions of will and mass participation. The qingyi emphasized national unity and "the steadfastness of the minds of the people." The court, led by members of the Manchu minority, saw mass participation in political issues as a threat to their power.

The qingyi opposed economic reform. At most, they thought that China could adopt the weapons of foreigners to defeat them. They attacked Li and the self-strengtheners for "appeasement and defeatism." They supported the pro-war faction at court, both against the French in 1884 and against the Japanese in 1895. They particularly opposed Li's 1885 agreement with the French.

The Japanese victory in the First Sino-Japanese War split the movement. Zhang Zhidong sided with the reformers during the Hundred Days Reform of 1898. He was also prominent in education reform, including reform of the Imperial Examinations, which were abolished in 1905. Others members of the group maintained their earlier anti-foreign stance. The disastrous Boxer Rebellion of 1900 can be seen as an attempt to implement the qingyi`s ideas about mass participation in the fight against foreign powers.
