= Yuelu Academy =

University in Changsha, China

- 嶽麓書院
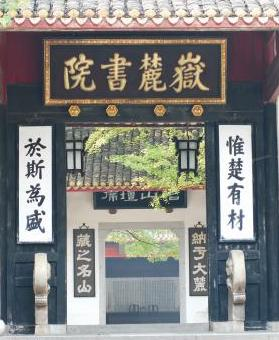
- Other names: Yuelu Academy of Classical Learning
- Type: Shuyuan
- Established: AD 976; 1050 years ago 1903; 123 years ago: Hunan Institute of Higher Learning; 1926; 100 years ago: Hunan University
- Affiliations: Confucianism
- Location: Yuelu Mountain, Yuelu District, Changsha, Hunan, China; 28°11′02″N 112°56′08″E

The Yuelu Academy (also known as the Yuelu Academy of Classical Learning, traditional Chinese: 嶽麓書院; simplified Chinese: 岳麓书院; pinyin: Yuèlù Shūyuàn) is on the east side of Yuelu Mountain in Yuelu District, Changsha, Hunan province, on the west bank of the Xiang River.

As one of the four most prestigious academies over the last 1000 years in China, Yuelu Academy has been a famous institution of higher learning as well as a centre of academic activities and cultures since it was formally set up during the Northern Song Dynasty. The academy was converted into the Hunan Institute of Higher Learning in 1903. It was later renamed Hunan Normal College, Hunan Public Polytechnic School, and finally Hunan University in 1926. Yuelu Academy was once a center of Confucian learning in China.

== History ==
The academy was founded in 976, the ninth year of the Song dynasty (960–1279) under the reign of Emperor Taizu (960–976), and was one of the four most renowned shuyuan (academies of higher learning). The renowned Confucian scholars Zhu Xi and Zhang Shi lectured at the academy.

During the Qing dynasty (1644–1911), the academy inculcated an ascetic philosophy of self-examination and dedication to rescuing the world from the decadence of recent times. The academy remained loyal to the Neo-Confucian school of the Song dynasty which emphasized moral self-cultivation, community solidarity, and social hierarchy. Among the prominent alumni were the early Qing scholars Wang Fuzhi and Yan Ruyi. But by the early 19th century, academy scholars saw no contradiction in devoting serious study also to practical subjects such as martial engineering, political economy, waterworks, and management of bureaucracy. They called these studies jingshi (statecraft), made up of the characters jing (manage) and shi (things, or "the world"). Early 19th century graduates formed what one historian called a "network of messianic alumni." These included Tao Zhu, who reformed the grain transportation system and salt monopoly; Wei Yuan, compiler of works on Western geography (Illustrated Treatise on the Maritime Kingdoms), the exploits of the Qing expansionist campaigns, and the basic collection of statecraft essays; Bao Shichen; and most prominent, Zeng Guofan, architect of the Tongzhi Restoration and leader of Xiang Army. Later 19th-century alumni include Zuo Zongtang, a reformer faction (Yangwu) official; Hu Linyi; Guo Songtao, China's first ambassador to a foreign country; Cai E, a major leader in defending the Republic of China during National Protection War era.

In 1903, the academy became a university, and in 1926, it was officially named Hunan University.

The academy is the only one of the ancient Chinese academies of classical learning to have evolved into a modern institution of higher learning. The historical transformation from Yuelu Academy to Hunan University can be seen as symbolic of the development of China's higher education. This change mirrors the vicissitudes of the education system in mainland China. As a part of Hunan University, the academy is currently a center of publication and research.

In 1988, it was listed as a "Major National Historical and Cultural Sites in Hunan" by the State Council of China.

== Gallery ==
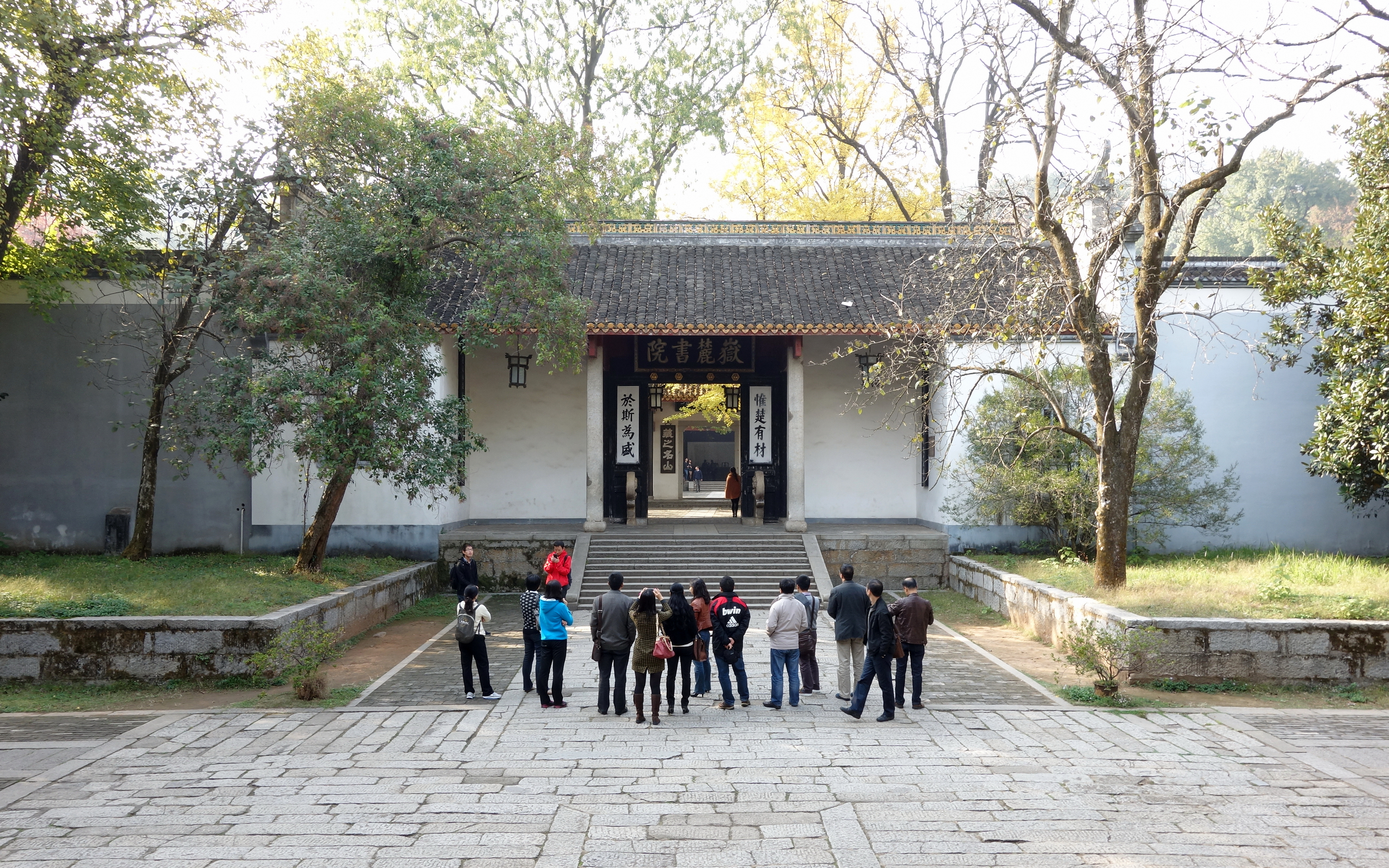
Entrance of Yuelu Academy

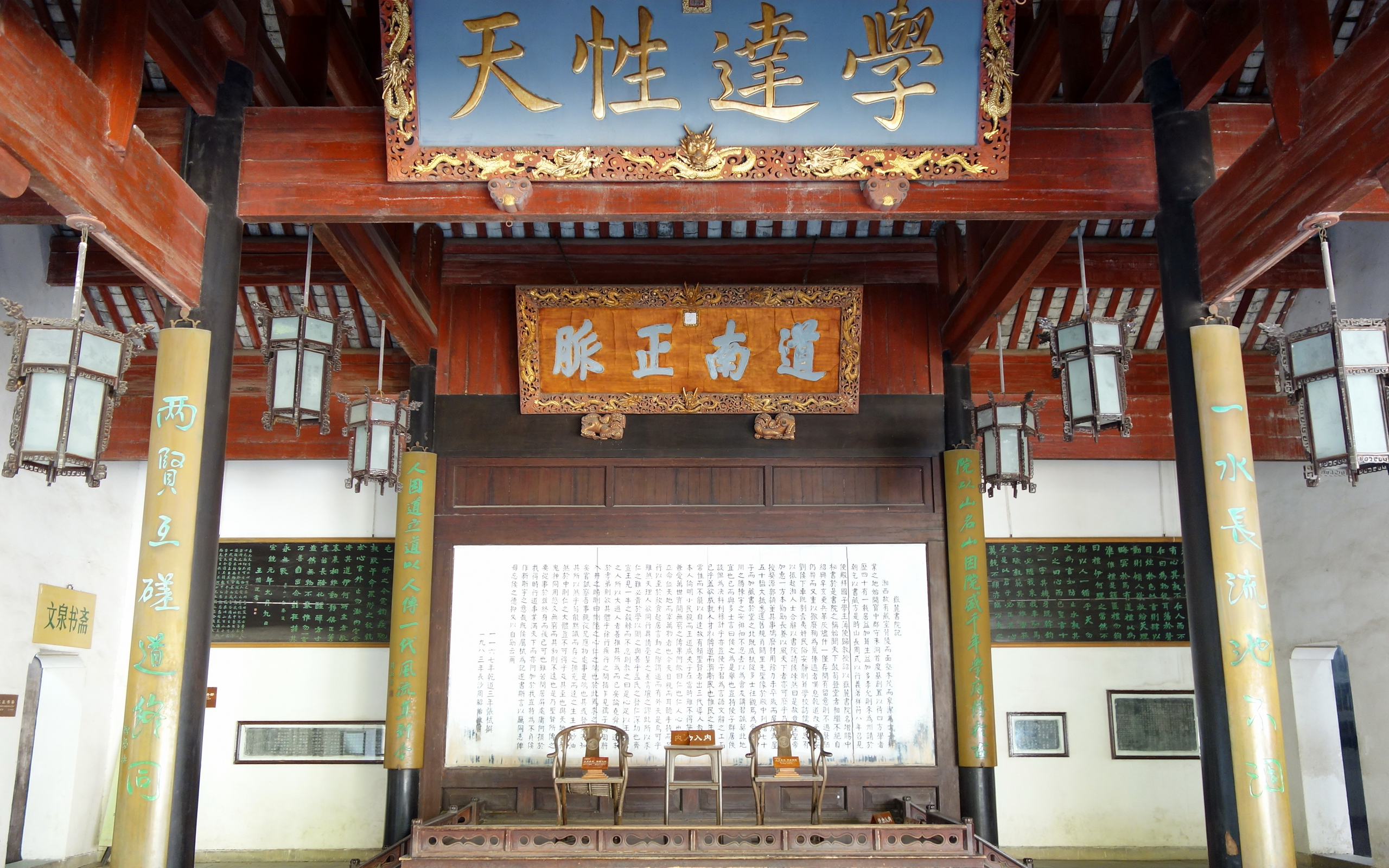
Lecture Hall

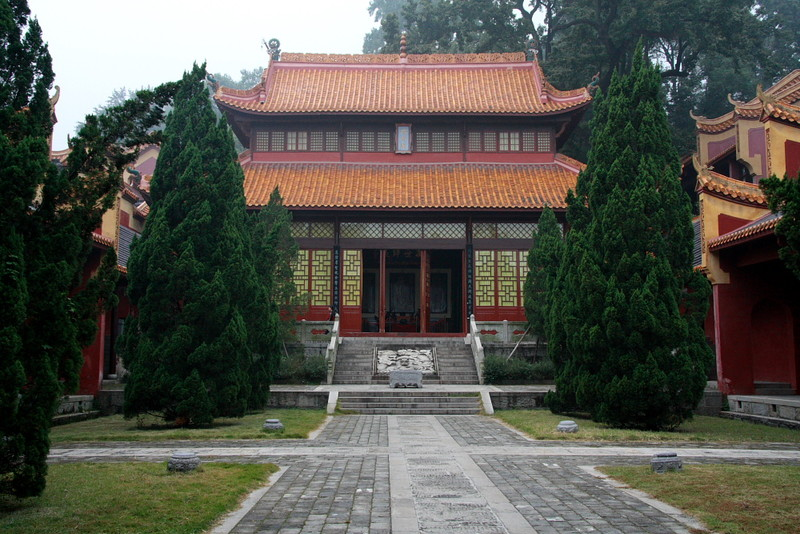
Confucius Temple

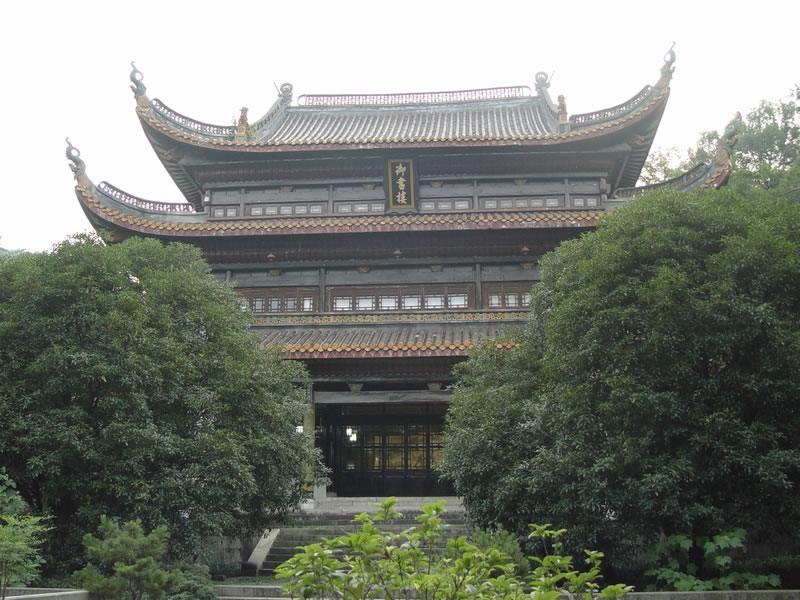
The Yuelu Academy

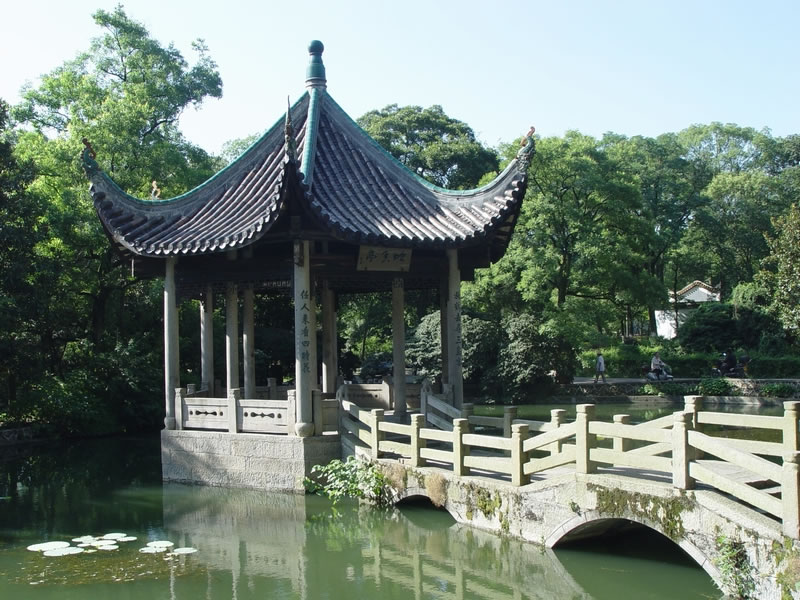
A pavilion

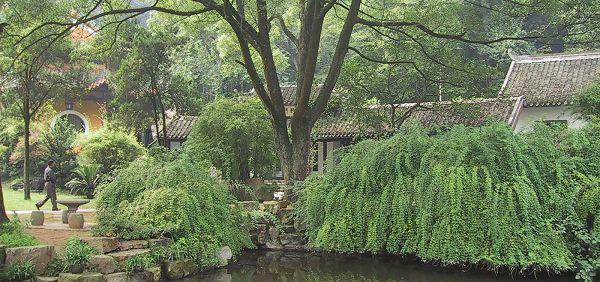
Yuelu Academy Hunan pond

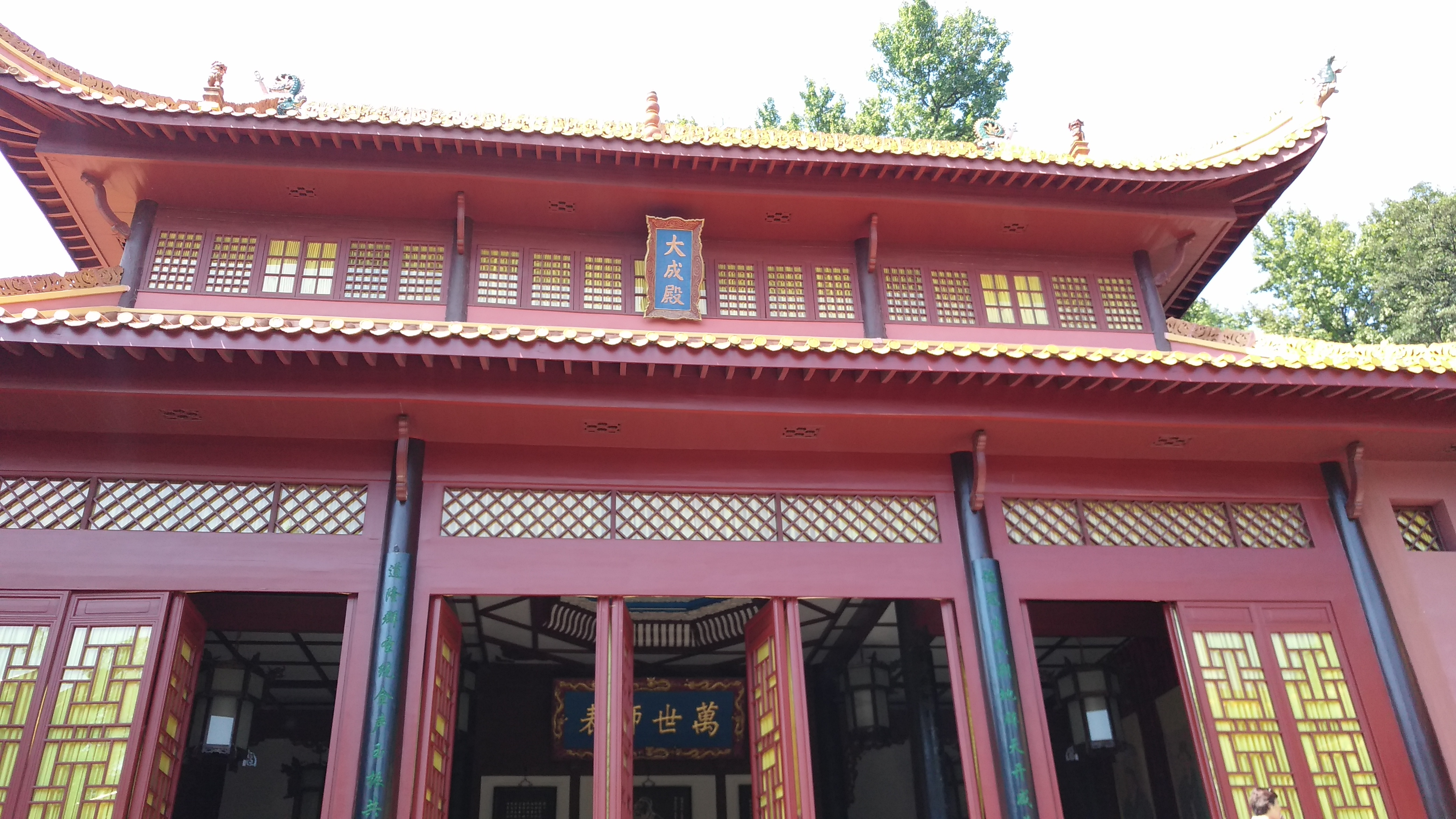
Dacheng Hall

Yuelu archive

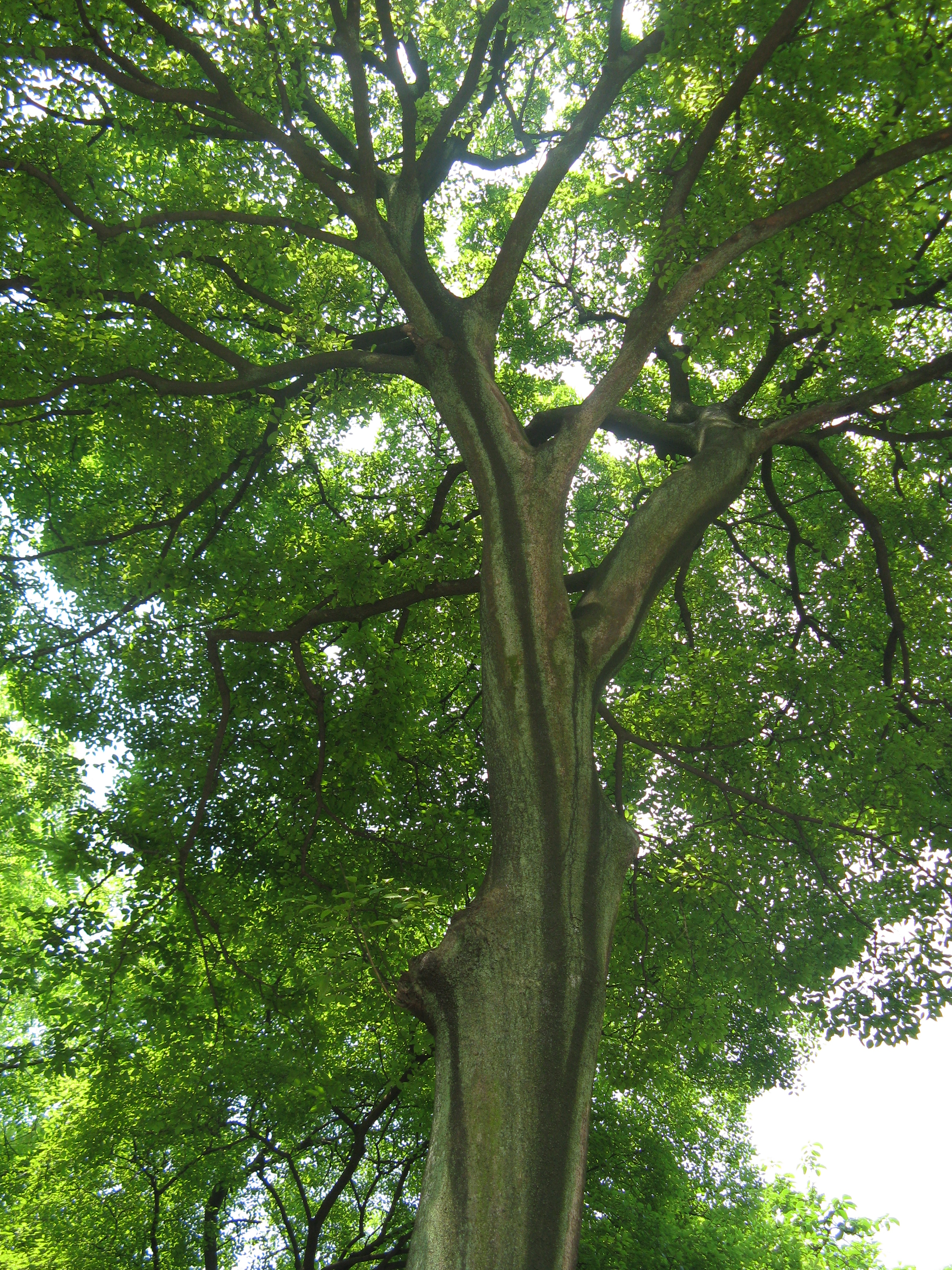
Chinese hackberry (C. sinensis)

== See also ==
- Hunan University
- Academies (Shuyuan)
- Hanlin Academy
- White Deer Grotto Academy
