= Yuelu Mountain =

Mountain in Changsha, Hunan, China

Yuelu Mountain 岳麓山
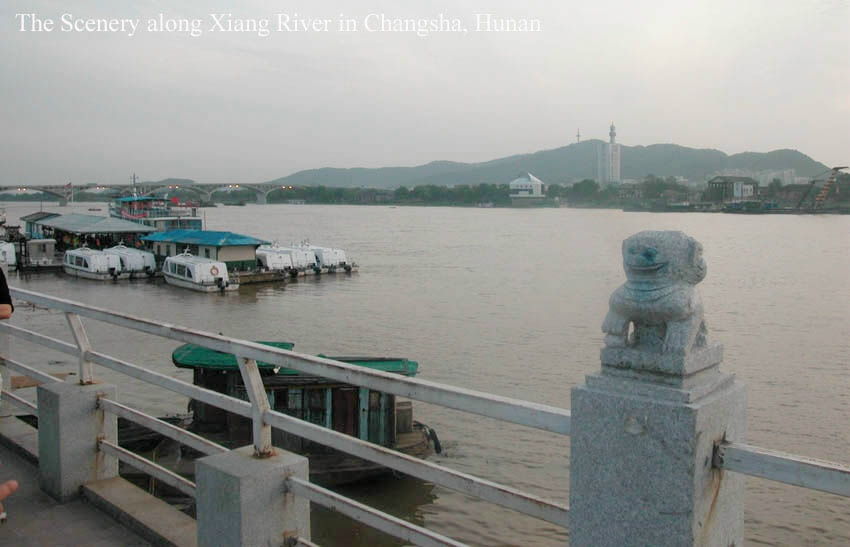
- Yuelu Mountain

Highest point
- Elevation: 300.8 m (987 ft)
- Coordinates: 28°11′41″N 112°56′36″E

Geography
- Location within Hunan
- Location: Yuelu District, Changsha, Hunan, China

Yuelu Mountain (simplified Chinese: 岳麓山; traditional Chinese: 嶽麓山; pinyin: yuèlù shān) is located on the west bank of the Xiang River, a tributary of the Yangtze River in Yuelu District, Changsha, Hunan. Its main peak and the highest point, Yunlu Peak, is about 300 metres (980 ft) above sea level.

== Introduction of Yuelu Mountain ==
There are more than 900 species of plants in Yuelu Mountain, and there are many ancient and famous trees, such as Podocarpus chinensis in the Jin Dynasty, ginkgo in the Tang Dynasty, camphor in the Song and Yuan Dynasties, and maple chestnut in the Ming and Qing Dynasties. Yuelu Mountain is also an area where Confucianism, Buddhism and Taoism intersect each other (三教合流).

== Scenic Spots on Yuelu Mountain ==
Yuelu Mountain is noted for its many scenic spots, including Qingfeng Gorge, Aiwan Pavilion, Lushan Temple, Yunlu Palace, the White Crane Spring, the Flying Stone and Yuelu Academy.

- Qingfeng Gorge lies in the low area between Yuelu Academy and Lushan Temple. It holds Aiwan Pavilion, one of four famous pavilions in ancient China, the Sheli Tower, and the tombs of Huang Xing (Huang Hsing) and Cai E (Tsai E).
- Autumn-Admiring Pavilion or Aiwan Pavilion and was built in A.D.1792. Its original name is Red Leaf Pavilion, later changed based on a poem by Du Mu. Mao Zedong once played and studied here and the remaining tablet was written by Mao Zedong in the 1950s. Aiwan Pavilion is supported by four red poles. There is a tablet with the poem, "Qinyuanchun, Changsha" written by Mao Zedong.
- Lushan Temple is located on the side of the mountain. It was built in A.D.268 and later destroyed and rebuilt several times. It was last rebuilt in the 1980s.
- Yunlu Palace is a Taoist place. The history of Taoist activities in Mount Yuelu is quite long. Yunlu Palace was built in A.D.1478, and Mount Yuelu has been an active center since then.
- The Flying Clock and Flying Stone are also famous attractions in Mount Yuelu. The Flying Clock hangs in a ginkgo tree near Yunlu Palace. Flying Stone lies under the Flying Clock.
- The King Yu Tablet: On the Tablet there was carved an article with 77 Chinese characters, now difficult to distinguish. Under the Tablet is Yuji Brook. Yu was an ancient hero who conquered floods.
- The Yuelu Academy (simplified Chinese: 岳麓书院, pinyin: yuè lù shū yuàn) is one of the four famous academies in ancient China. It is located at the foot of Yuelu Mountain. As one of the oldest academy in the world, the ancient and traditional academies have been fully preserved. Yuelu Academy is also the largest and best-preserved academy complex in China.
