= Heishipu Subdistrict =

Heishipu Subdistrict 黑石铺街道
- Subdistrict
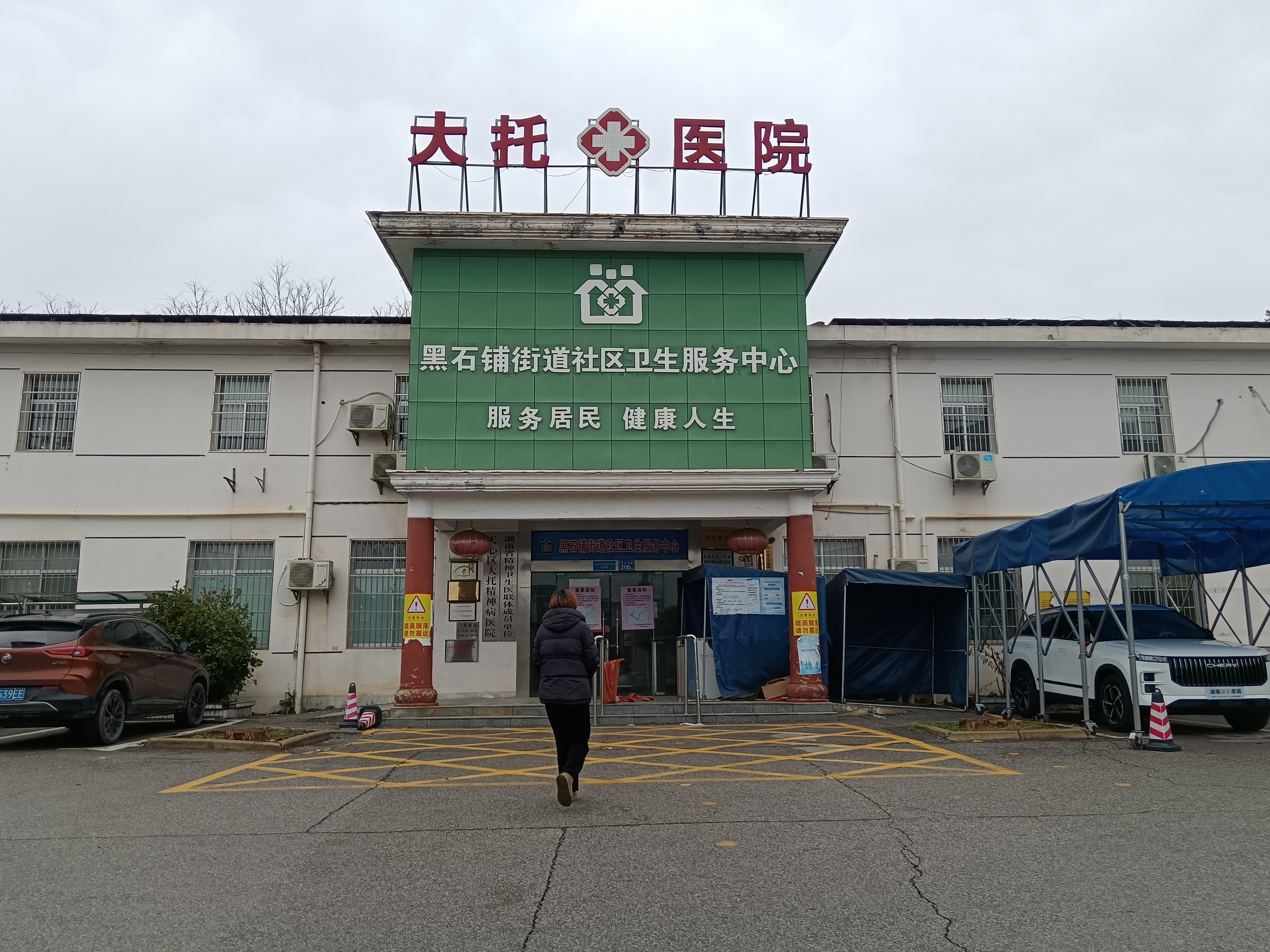
- Former Community Health Service Center of Heishipu Subdistrict

- Location in Hunan.
- Coordinates: 28°05′25″N 112°59′42″E
- Country: People's Republic of China
- Province: Hunan
- Prefecture-level city: Changsha
- District: Tianxin District

Area
  - Total: 8.97 km^{2} (3.46 sq mi)

Population (2021)
  - Total: 38,017
  - Density: 4,240/km^{2} (11,000/sq mi)
- Time zone: UTC+08:00 (China Standard)
- Postal code: 410114
- Area code: 0731

Chinese name
- Simplified Chinese: 黑石铺街道
- Traditional Chinese: 黑石鋪街道
Transcriptions
Standard Mandarin
- Hanyu Pinyin: Hēishípù Jiēdào

Heishipu Subdistrict (Chinese: 黑石铺街道) is a subdistrict in Tianxin District of Changsha, Hunan, China. As of the 2021 census it had a population of 38,017 and an area of 8.97-square-kilometre (3.46 sq mi).

== Administrative division ==
As of 2023, the subdistrict is divided into two communities and three villages:

- Yili Community (一力社区)
- Heishipu Community (黑石铺社区)
- Heishi (黑石村)
- Jiufeng (九峰村)
- Pitang (披塘村)

== History ==
The region was known as Datuo Township/ Town (大托乡（镇）) and belonged to Changsha County in history. It came under the jurisdiction of Tianxin District in 1996. In 2012, Tianxin District abolished Datuo Town and separated it into Heishipu Subdistrict, Datuopu Subdistrict, and Xianfeng Subdistrict.

== Geography ==
Heishipu Subdistrict shares a border with Datuopu Subdistrict to the west, Guihuaping Subdistrict and Xianfeng Subdistrict to the east, Xinkaipu Subdistrict and Qingyuan Subdistrict to the north, and Xianfeng Subdistrict to the south.

The Xiang River through the subdistrict south to north.

== Economy ==
The local economy is primarily based upon agriculture and local industry.

== Demographics ==
Historical population
| Year | Pop. | ±% |
|---|---|---|
| 2011 | 20,800 | — |
| 2021 | 38,017 | +82.8% |

The 2021 census reported the town had a population of 38,017.

== Transportation ==
The Changsha Ring Expressway (长沙绕城高速公路) and Xiangfu West Road (湘府西路) cross the Xiang River at the north of Heishipu Subdistrict.

The Furong South Road (芙蓉南路) is a major north–south interstate that runs through many of Heishipu Subdistrict's east areas and intersects with the Changsha Ring Expressway (长沙绕城高速公路) and Xiangfu West Road (湘府西路).

The Tianxin Avenue (天心大道) is a northwest–southeast highway in the town.

Heishipu railway station (黑石铺火车站) serves the subdistrict, which was originally built in 1937.

The Datuo station is located in the subdistrict.
