= Four Seas =

Metaphorical boundaries of ancient China

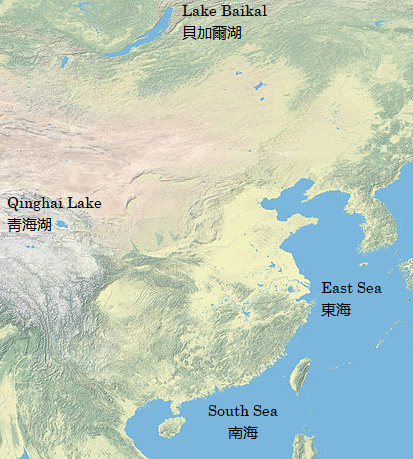
- Chinese: 四海
Transcriptions
Standard Mandarin
- Hanyu Pinyin: Sìhǎi
- Bopomofo: ㄙˋ ㄏㄞˇ
- Gwoyeu Romatzyh: Syhhae
- Wade–Giles: Ssŭ^{4}-hai^{3}
- IPA: [sî.xàɪ]
Yue: Cantonese
- Jyutping: Sei^{3} Hoi^{2}
Southern Min
- Hokkien POJ: sìr-hái

The Four Seas (Chinese: 四海; pinyin: Sìhǎi) were four bodies of water that metaphorically made up the boundaries of ancient China. There is a sea for each for the four cardinal directions. The West Sea is Qinghai Lake, the East Sea is the East China Sea, the North Sea is Lake Baikal, and the South Sea is the South China Sea. Two of the seas were symbolic until they were tied to genuine locations during the Han dynasty's wars with the Xiongnu. The lands "within the Four Seas", a literary name for China, are alluded to in Chinese literature and poetry.

== History ==
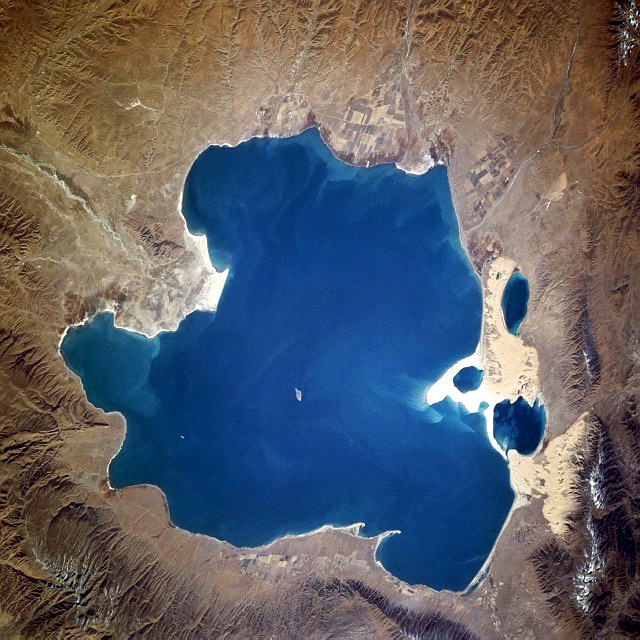
Qinghai Lake, the West Sea

The original Four Seas were a metaphor for the borders of pre-Han dynasty China. Only two of the Four Seas were tied to real locations, the East Sea with the East China Sea and the South Sea with the South China Sea. During the Han dynasty, wars with the Xiongnu brought them north to Lake Baikal. They recorded that the lake was a "huge sea" (hanhai) and designated it the mythical North Sea. They also encountered Qinghai Lake, which they called the West Sea, and the lakes Lop Nur and Bostang in Xinjiang. The Han dynasty expanded beyond the traditional West Sea and reached Lake Balkhash, the westernmost boundary of the empire and the new West Sea of the dynasty. Expeditions were sent to explore the Persian Gulf, but went no further.

Chinese writers and artists often alluded to the Four Seas. Jia Yi, in an essay that summarized the collapse of Qin dynasty, wrote that while the state of Qin has succeeded in "pocketing all within the Four Seas, and swallowing up everything in all Eight Directions", its ruler "lacked humaneness and rightness; because preserving power differs fundamentally from seizing power". The metaphor is also referenced in the Chinese adage "we are all brothers of the Four Seas", a proverb with utopian undercurrents. The lyrics of a popular Han dynasty folk song extol that "within the Four Seas, we are all brothers, and none be taken as strangers!"

== See also ==
- China Seas
- Names of China
- Tianxia
- Borders of China
- Natural borders of France
- Seven Seas
- List of seas
- A mari usque ad mare
- "Deutschlandlied", which similarly defines Germany's borders as four rivers
