= Muyungang River =

Chinese river

Coordinates: 27°58′34″N 113°00′03″E

Muyungang River (Chinese: 暮云港) is the southernmost one of right-bank tributaries in Changsha section of Xiang River in Hunan, China. The river has two branches of headwaters risen in Tiaoma Town of Yuhua District, of which the right (western) source originates from Xiyu (Chinese: 喜雨村), the left (eastern) source rises in Xintian (Chinese: 新田村). the two streams intersect at Sanxianling (Chinese: 三仙岭村). From the confluence with two branches of headwaters at Sanxianling, The drainage basin of the river covers an area of about 90 square kilometres (35 sq mi), the trunk stream of the river flows 7.94 kilometres (4.93 mi) southwest through Tiaoma Town of Yuhua District and Muyun Subdistrict of Tianxin District before merging into Xiang River at the river mouth between Dawantang (Chinese: 大湾塘) and Maziling (Chinese: 麻子岭).
