= Changsha Mosque =

Mosque in Changsha, Hunan, China

- 长沙清真寺
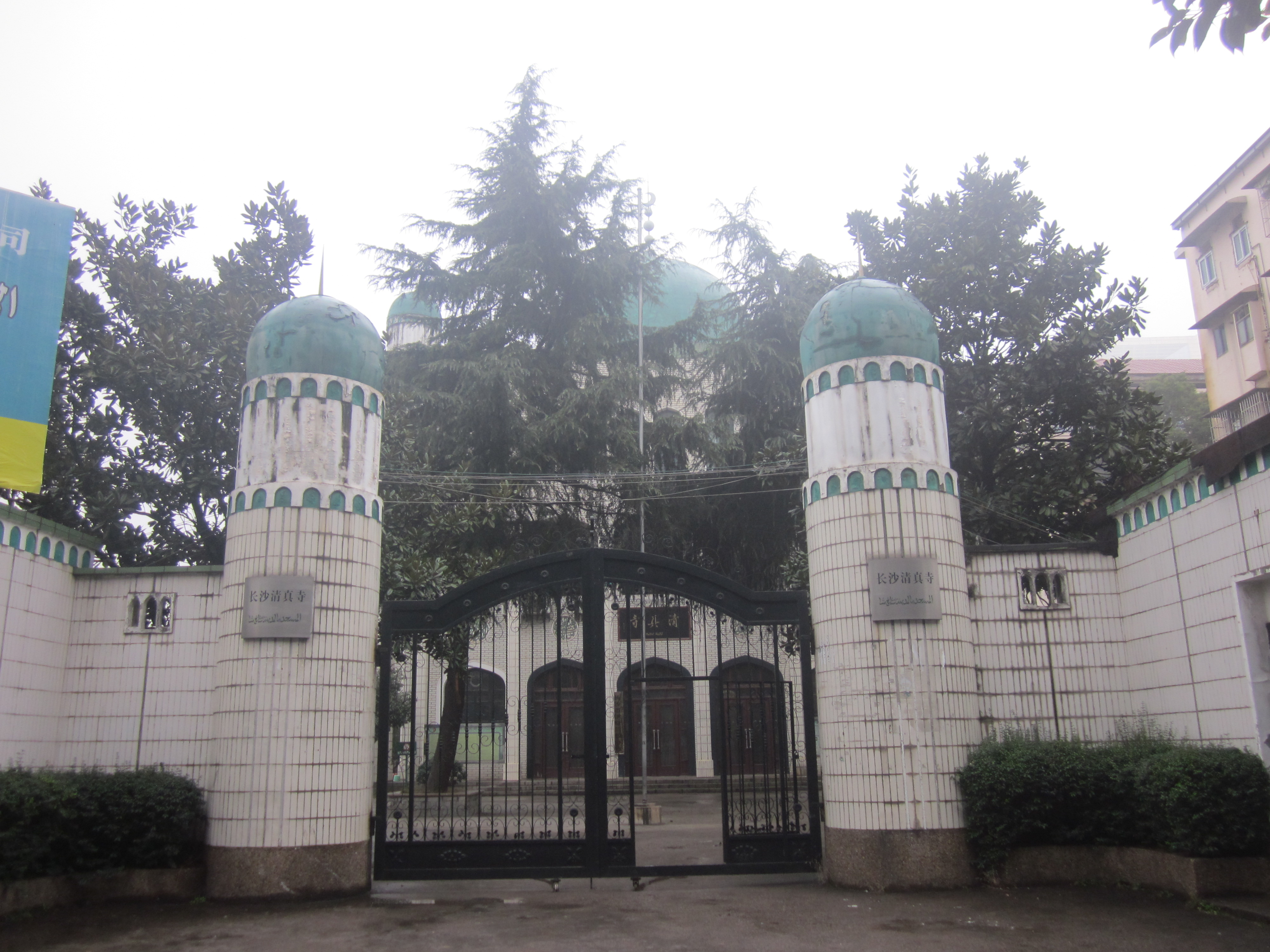

- Location of the mosque in Hunan

Religion
- Affiliation: Sunni Islam
- Ecclesiastical or organizational status: Mosque
- Status: Active

Location
- Location: Tianxin, Changsha, Hunan
- Country: China
- Interactive map of Changsha Mosque
- Coordinates: 28°11′08″N 112°59′21″E

Architecture
- Type: Mosque
- Style: Islamic
- Established: 1711 (first structure); 1985 (current)

Specifications
- Interior area: 1,400 m^{2} (15,000 sq ft)
- Dome: 1
- Site area: 3,948 m^{2} (42,500 sq ft)

The Changsha Mosque (simplified Chinese: 长沙清真寺; traditional Chinese: 長沙清真寺; pinyin: Chángshā Qīngzhēnsì) is a mosque located on Mount Huilong (回龙山) in the Tianxin District of Changsha, in the Hunan province of China. The Changsha Mosque is the site of Changsha Islamic Association.

== History ==
The Changsha Mosque, called "Kèsì" (客寺), was built in 1711 CE by businessmen from both Henan and Shaanxi provinces during the Qing dynasty. In 1918, businessmen from Nanjing added Jingling School (镜陵义学) to the south of the mosque. The 1938 Changsha fire destroyed most of the buildings; subsequently rebuilt by local Muslims.

During the Cultural Revolution, the Quran written by ancient Imam were burned by the Red Guards. In 1985, the Changsha government budgeted ¥0.85 million to build a new mosque on Mount Huilong in the Tianxin District near Baisha Well.

== Architecture ==
The 1985 mosque was built in the Islamic architectural style and is located on a 3,948-square-metre (42,500 sq ft) site, that includes 1,400 square metres (15,000 sq ft) of interior area. It consists of prayer hall, pavilion, wing room and other facilities. The prayer hall is a three-storey building.

== Transportation ==
Buses No. 314, 171, 139, 108 to Baisha Well Bus Stop (白沙井站) provide access to the mosque.

== Gallery ==
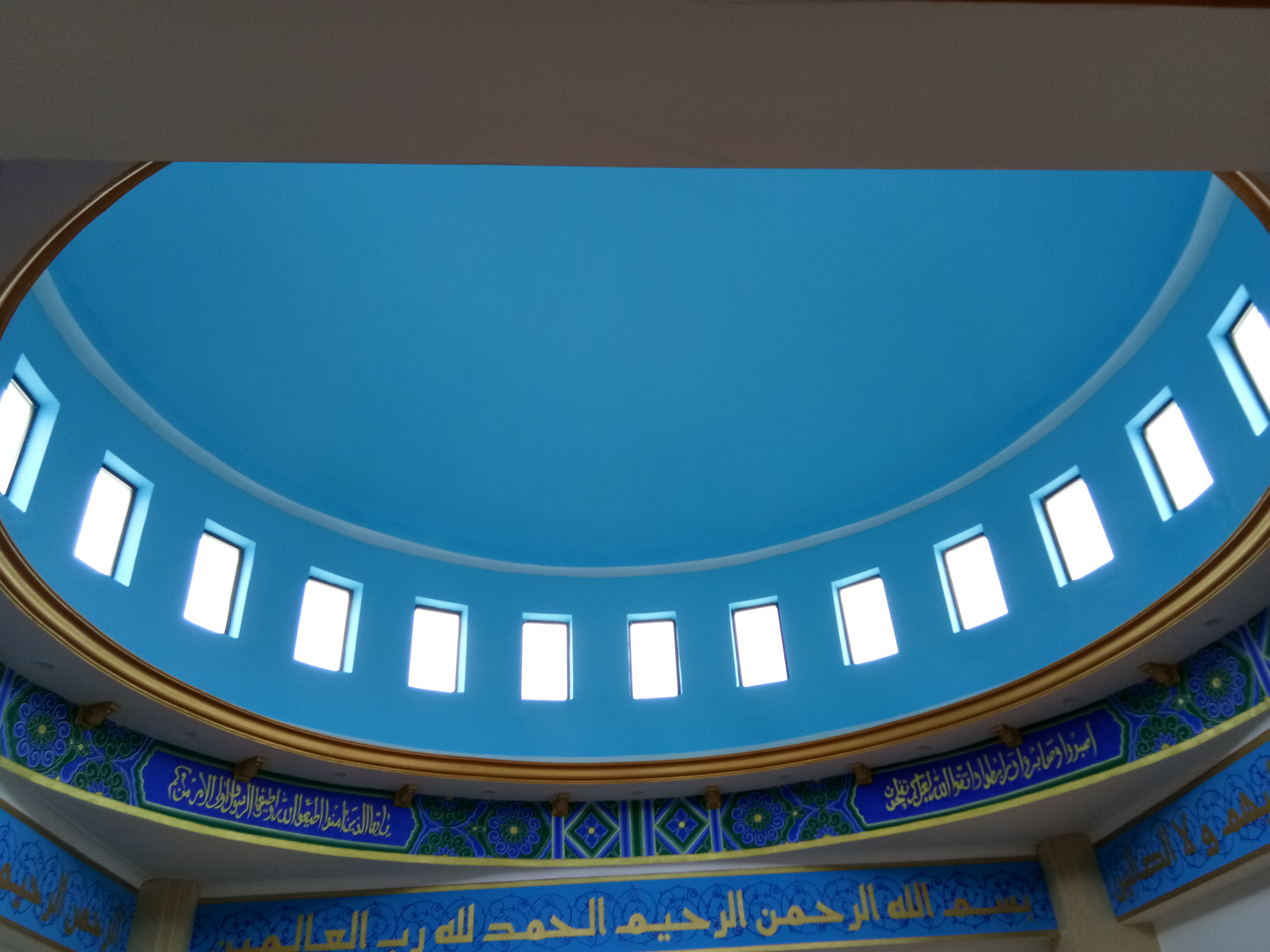
The dome interior

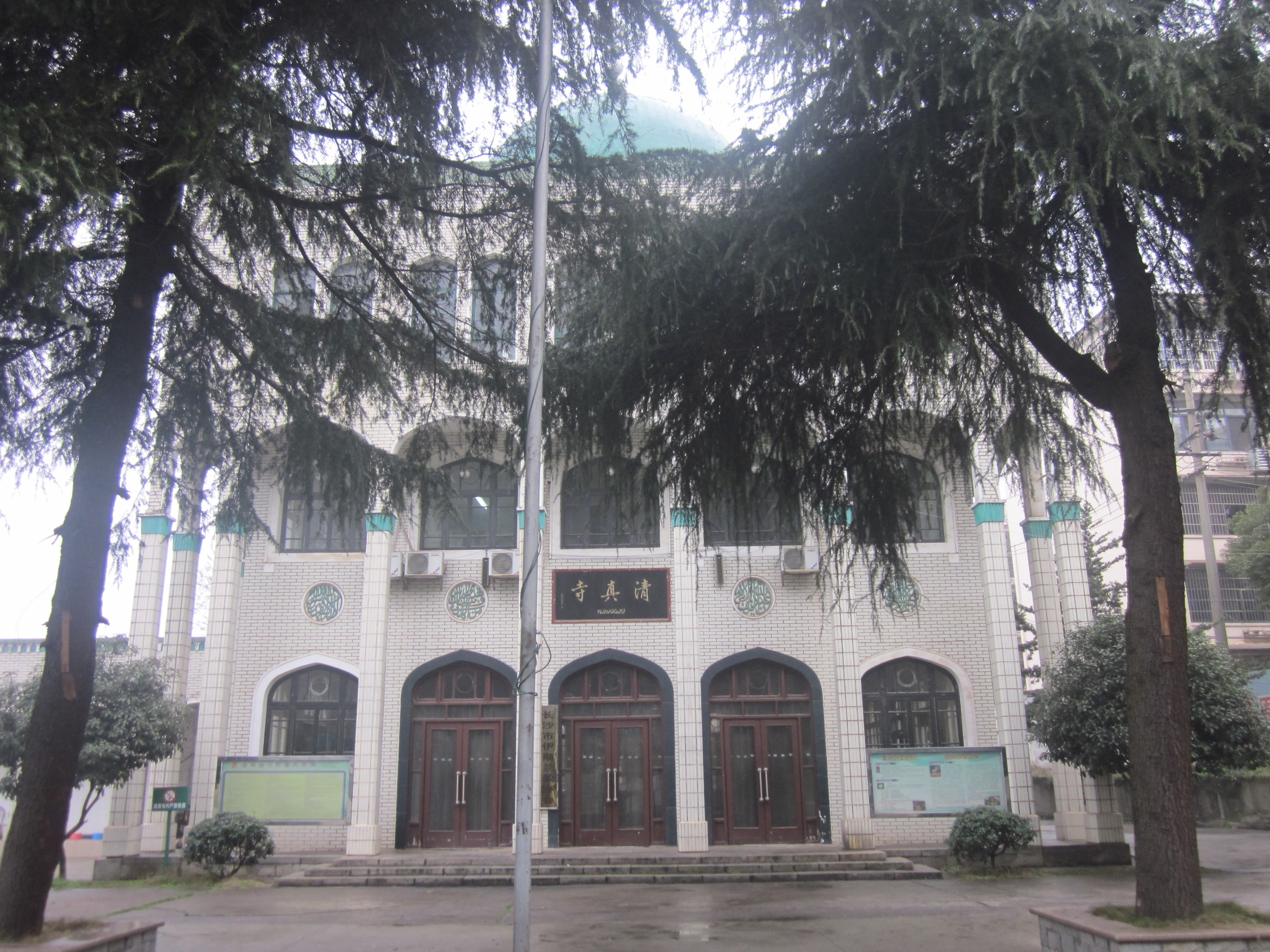
Exterior of the mosque

== See also ==
Changsha Mosque
- Traditional Chinese: 長沙清真寺
- Simplified Chinese: 长沙清真寺
Transcriptions
Standard Mandarin
- Hanyu Pinyin: Chángshā Qīngzhēnsì

- Islam in China
- List of mosques in China
