= Nantuo Subdistrict =

Nantuo Subdistrict 南托街道
- Subdistrict
- Location in Hunan
- Coordinates: 28°01′21″N 112°57′55″E
- Country: People's Republic of China
- Province: Hunan
- Prefecture-level city: Changsha
- District: Tianxin District
- Incorporated (township): 1950
- Designated (subdistrict): 2013

Area
  - Total: 29.47 km^{2} (11.38 sq mi)

Population (2015)
  - Total: 70,860
  - Density: 2,404/km^{2} (6,228/sq mi)
- Time zone: UTC+08:00 (China Standard)
- Postal code: 410118
- Area code: 0731

Nantuo Subdistrict (Chinese: 南托街道; pinyin: Nántuō Jiēdào) is a subdistrict in Tianxin District of Changsha, Hunan, China. As of the 2015 census it had a population of 70,860 and an area of 29.47-square-kilometre (11.38 sq mi).

== Administrative division ==
As of 2016, the subdistrict is divided into one community and five villages:

- Nantuoling Community (南托岭社区)
- Beitang (北塘村)
- Nantang (南塘村)
- Niujiaotang (牛角塘村)
- Sanxing (三兴村)
- Yanjiang (沿江村)
- Xingma (兴马村)

== History ==
It was incorporated as a township in 1950. In 1955, it was merged into Muyun Town and came under the jurisdiction of Changsha County. On December 28, 2013, Muyun Subdistrict and Nantuo Subdistrict was established. On January 4, 2015,

it came under the jurisdiction of Tianxin District.

== Geography ==
It lies at the southern of Changsha, bordering Yuelu District to the west, Xiangtan to the south, Datuopu Subdistrict and Xianfeng Subdistrict to the north, and Muyun Subdistrict to the east. To the west, the region is bounded by the Xiang River.

The Xiang River flows through the subdistrict south to north.

== Economy ==
The main contributors to the subdistrict's economy are commerces and manufacturing industry.

== Transportation ==
- National Highway 107
- Nanhu Road (南湖路; 'South Lake Road')
- Shichang Road (市场路; 'Market Road')
- South Furong Road (芙蓉南路; 'South Lotus Road')

== Gallery ==
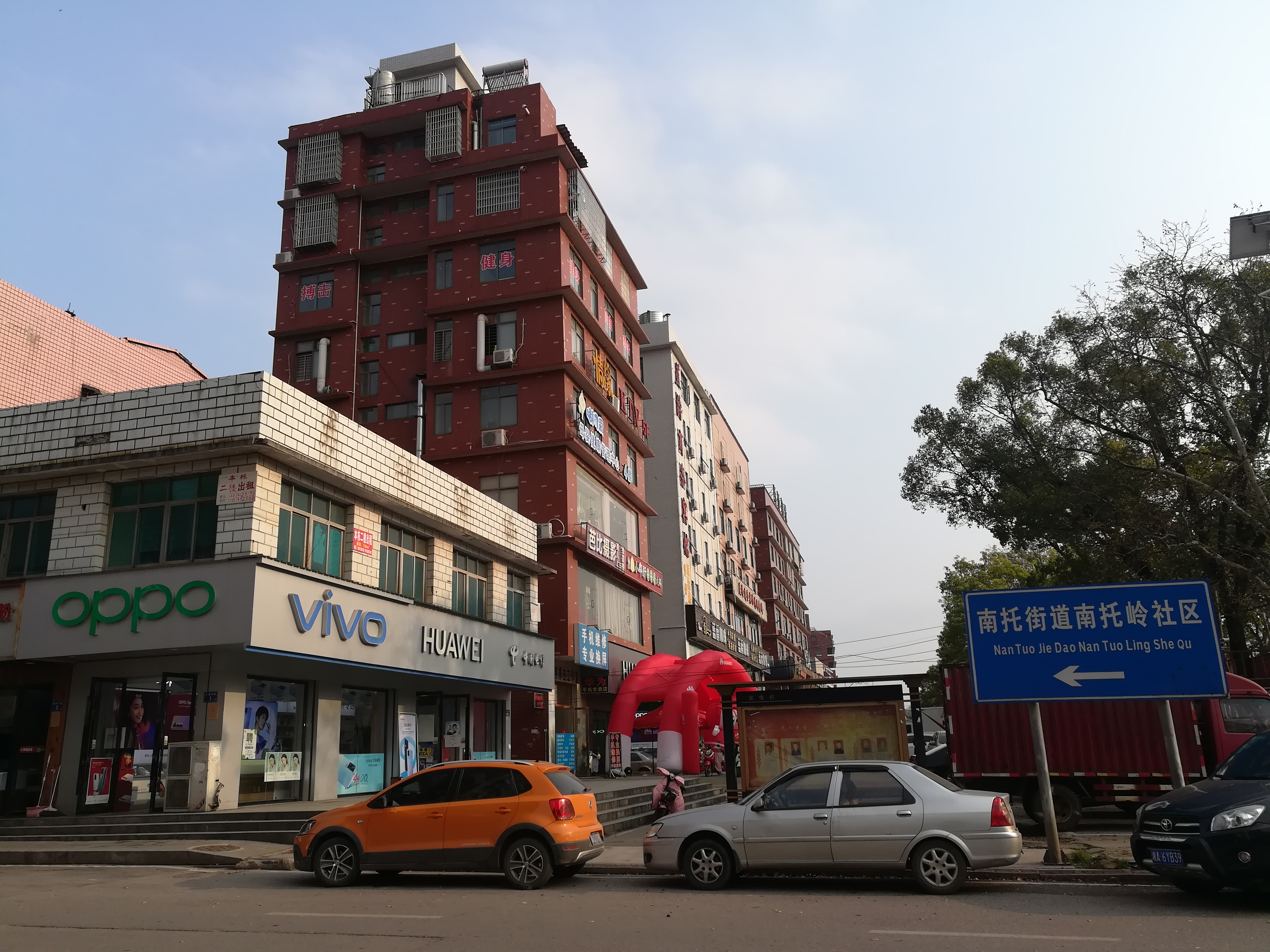
Residential buildings in Nantuoling Community

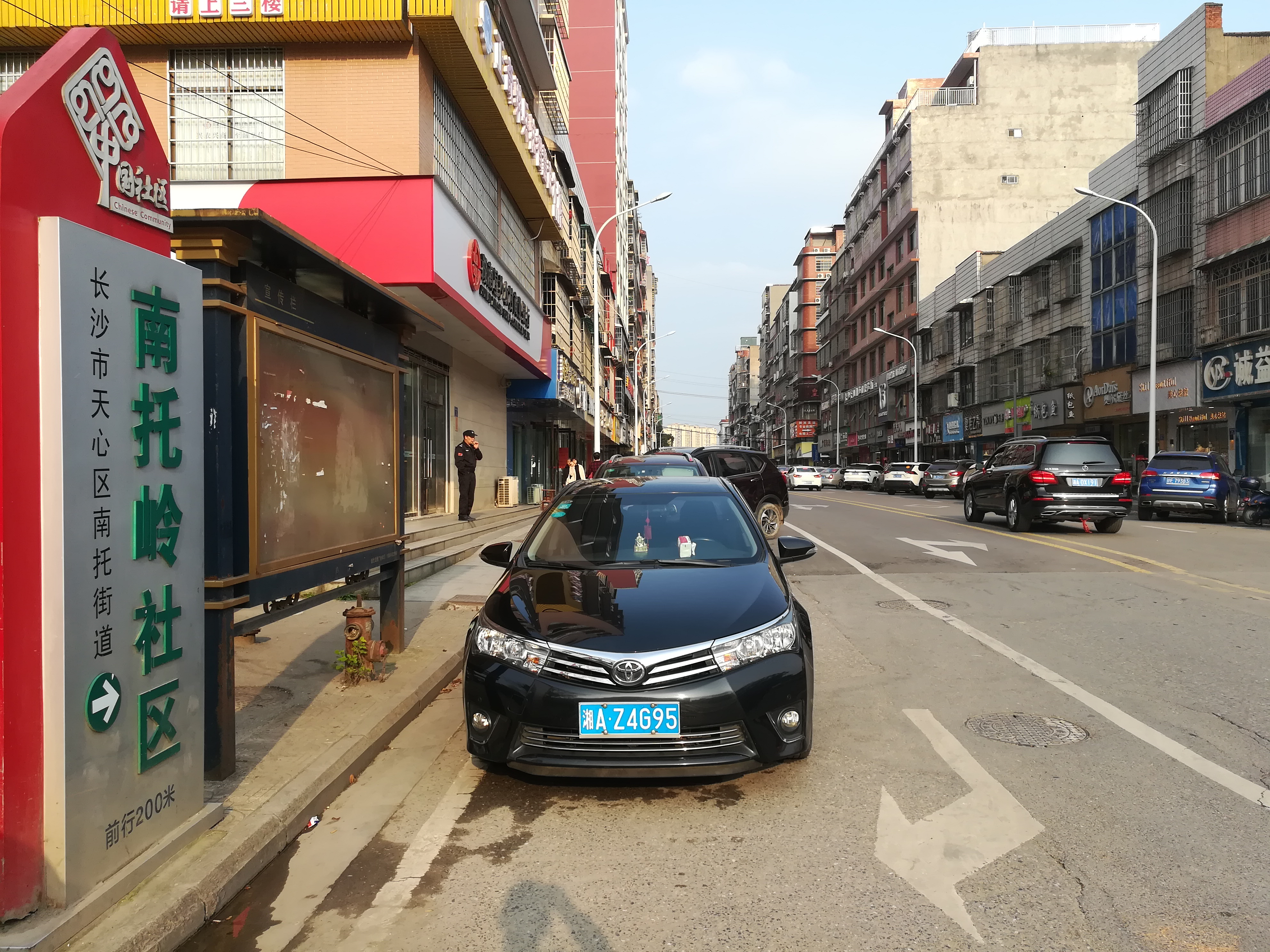
Residential buildings in Nantuoling Community

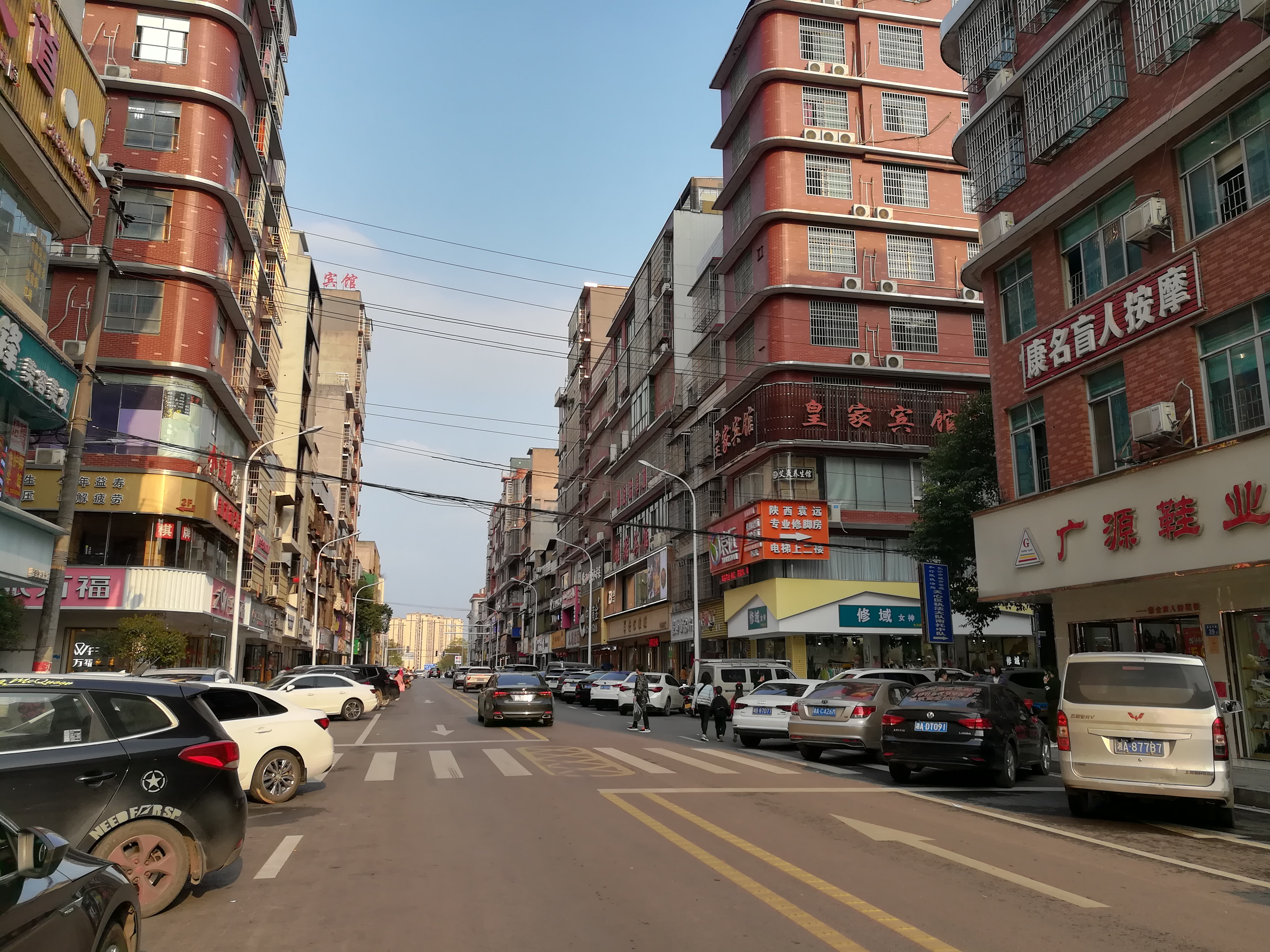
Residential buildings in Nantuoling Community

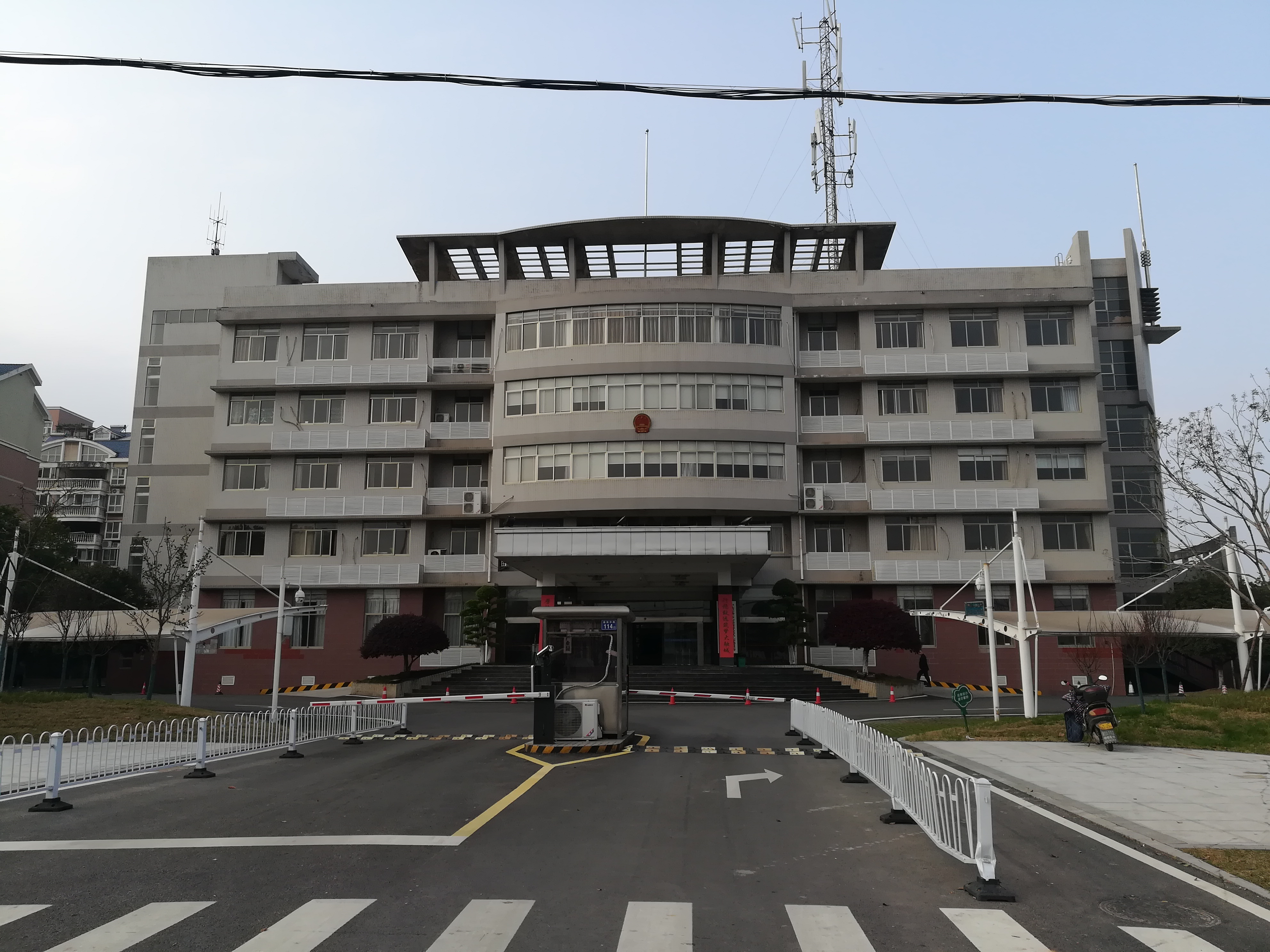
Management Committee of Tianxin District Economic and Technological Development Zone
