= Jiayi =

Jiayi may refer to:

== People ==
- Jia Yi (賈誼; 201–169 BCE), a Chinese poet

== Places ==
- Chiayi City (嘉義市), provincial city in southern Taiwan, completely surrounded by Chiayi County
- Chiayi County (嘉義縣), county in southern Taiwan, completely surrounds but does not include Chiayi City
