= Changsha Ecological Zoo =

Changsha Ecological Zoo 长沙生态动物园
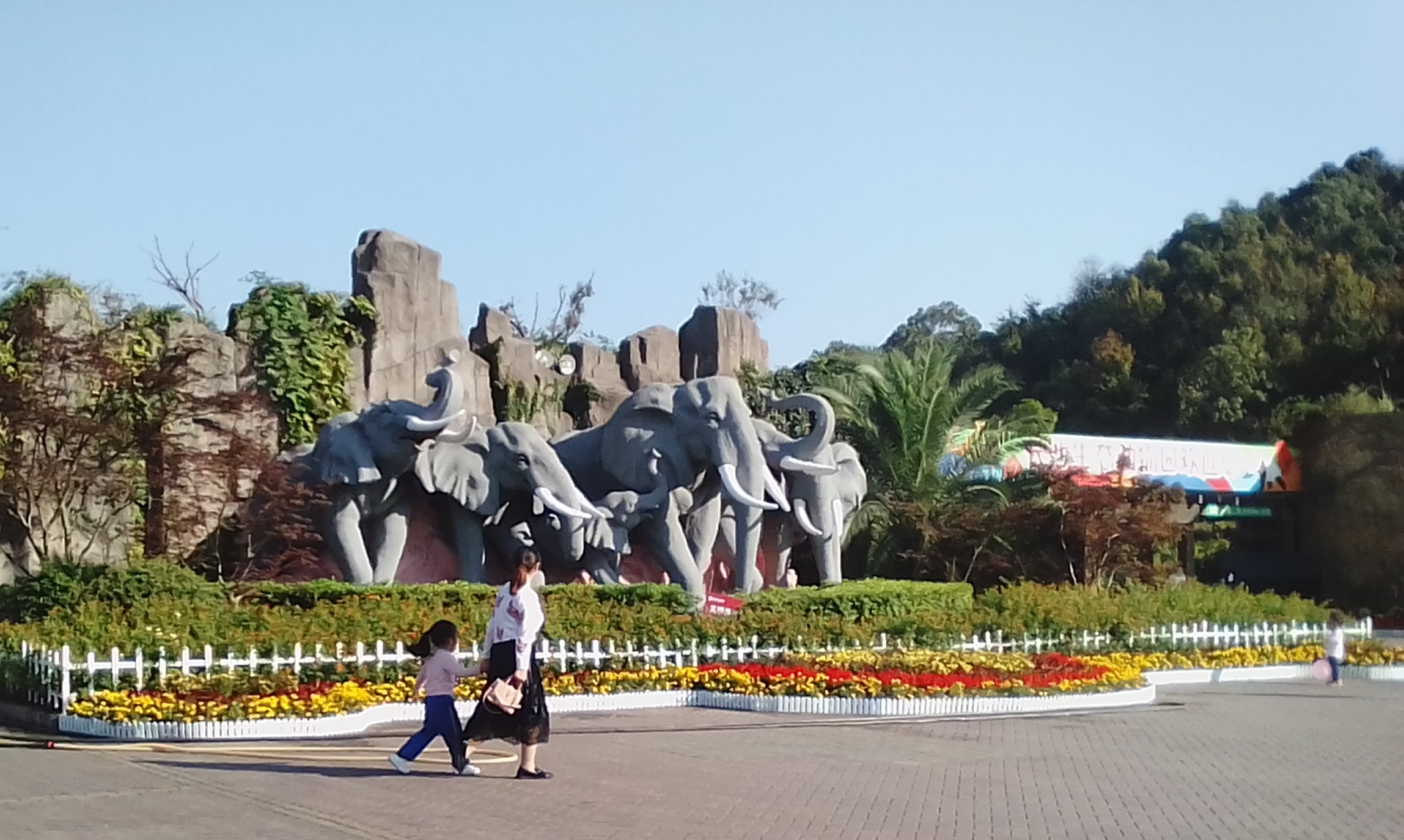
- Interactive map of Changsha Ecological Zoo 长沙生态动物园
- 28°02′21″N 113°00′38″E
- Date opened: October 2010
- Location: Muyun, Changsha, China
- Land area: 100 ha (250 acres)
- No. of animals: 5,000
- No. of species: 500
- Website: official website

Changsha Ecological Zoo (simplified Chinese: 长沙生态动物园; traditional Chinese: 長沙生態動物園; pinyin: Chángshā Shēngtài Dòngwùyuán) is a zoo in Muyun, Changsha, Hunan, China.

Covering an area of 100 hectares (250 acres), the zoo includes a walking zone, driving zone, education zone, ecological scenic zone, leisure zone and a service zone. It hosts over 300 animal species, and more than 5,000 animals.

== History ==
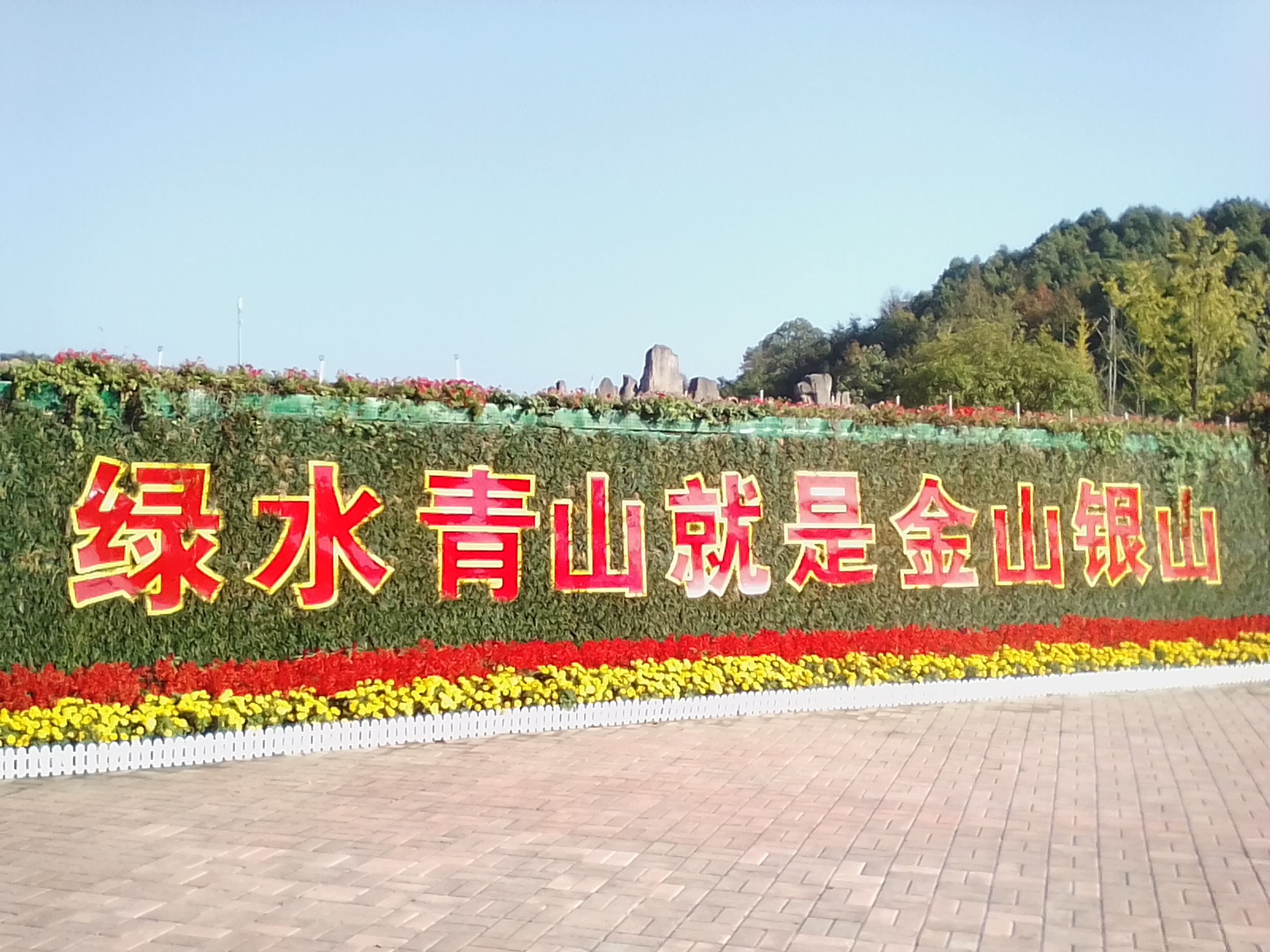
Front part of Changsha Ecological Zoo

The Zoo has a history of 54 years while it was called Changsha Zoo until October 2010.

== Changsha Zoo ==
At the beginning of 1934, Changsha had a Zoo in Tianxin Park and reared more than 20 animals. In 1958, the Changsha Zoo was relocated to Martyrs Park and were officially listed. The park is a scenic, breeding and research area for wildlife in Hunan Province.

== See also ==
- List of tourist attractions in China
