= Muyun Economic Development Zone =

Development zone in China

Muyun Economic Development Zone (simplified Chinese: 湖南暮云经济开发区; traditional Chinese: 湖南暮雲經濟技術開發區; pinyin: Húnán Mùyún Jīngjì Jìshù Kāifāqū) is an economic development zone at province level in Tianxin District of Changsha City, Hunan Province, China, one of two economic development zones in Tianxin District. It is the original Changsha Muyun Industrial Park (长沙暮云工业园) created in August 2001. In March 2012, it was renamed to the present name.

Muyun Economic Development Zone is located in the central south of Changsha city proper, on the eastern shore of the Xiang River, it adjoins Tianxin Economic Development Zone to the north and Zhaoshan Demonstration Area (昭山示范区) of Xiangtan to the south. It has an area of 64.07 kilometres (39.81 mi), and covers the whole area of Muyun and Nantuo subdistricts (former Munyun Town).
