= Former Residence of Jia Yi =

- 贾谊故居
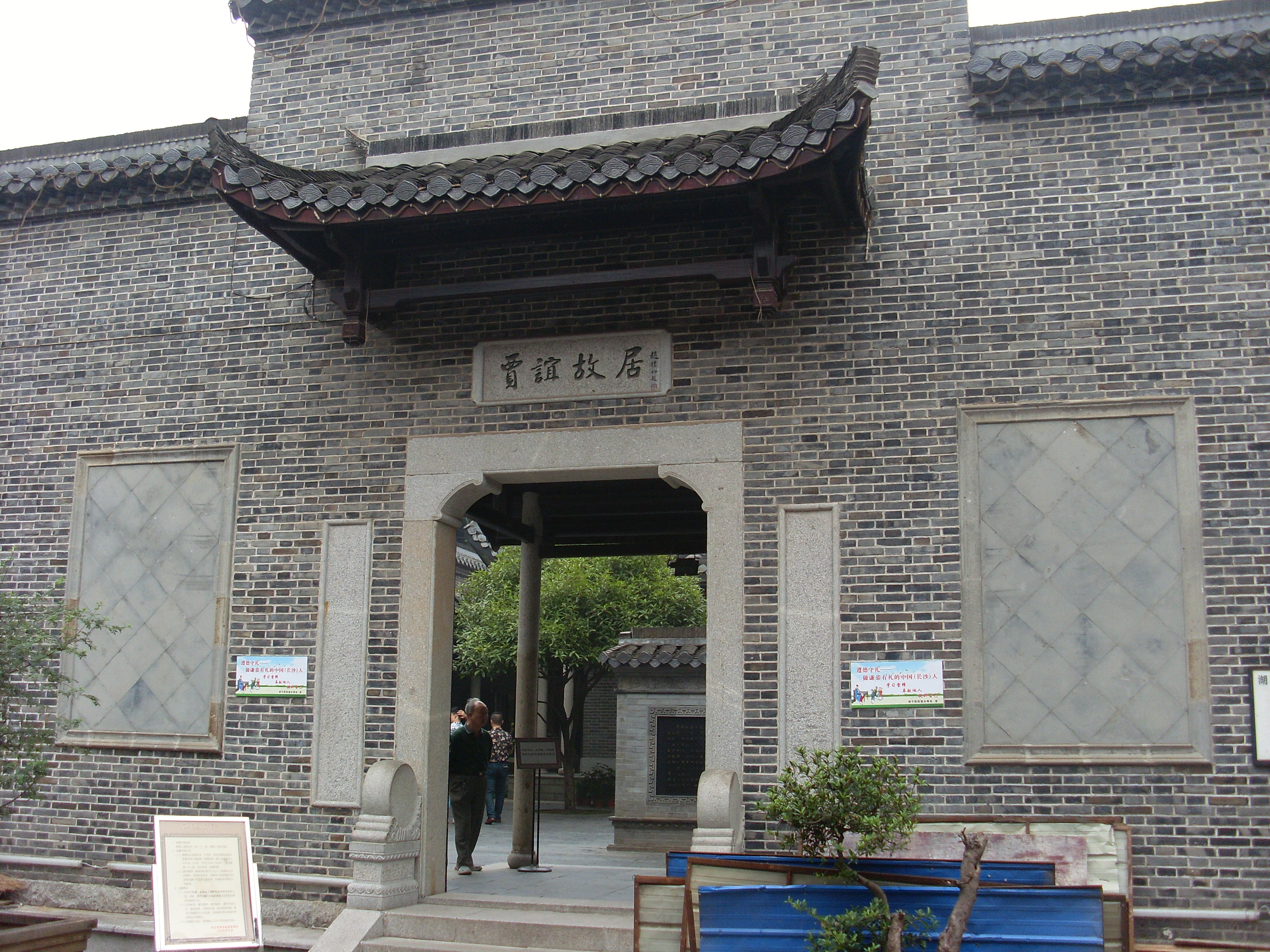
- Entrance.

- Location within Hunan

General information
- Type: Traditional folk houses
- Architectural style: Chinese architecture
- Location: Tianxin District, Changsha, Hunan, China
- Coordinates: 28.192593°N 112.972302°E
- Opened: 1996
- Renovated: 1996
- Affiliation: Government of Changsha

Technical details
- Material: Brick and wood
- Floor area: 350 m^{2} (3,800 sq ft)
- Grounds: 2,490 m^{2} (26,800 sq ft)

The Former Residence of Jia Yi or Jia Yi's Former Residence (simplified Chinese: 贾谊故居; traditional Chinese: 賈誼故居; pinyin: Jiǎ Yí Gùjū) was built during the Qing dynasty (1644–1911). It is located in Tianxin District of Changsha, Hunan, China. It has an area of about 2,490 m^{2} (26,800 sq ft) and a building area of about 350 m^{2} (3,800 sq ft). It contains buildings such as the gate, the Grand Preceptor Hall (太傅殿), the Grand Preceptor Temple (贾太傅祠), the Xunqiu Cottage (寻秋草堂), the Old Tablet Pavilion (古碑亭), the Stone Tablets (碑廊), the Grand Preceptor Well (太傅井).

== History ==
In 177, Jia Yi had retreated and worked in Hunan for the Changsha King's Grand Preceptor (长沙王太傅, he lived in here.

In 1580, in the eighth year of the age of the Wanli Emperor, the building was rebuilt by a local officer. It was renamed Qu Yuan and Jia Yi Temple (屈贾二先生祠).

In 1938, the Wenxi Fire damaged about ninety percent of the buildings; only the Grand Preceptor Hall survived.

In November 1996, the People's Government of Changsha rebuilt the residence.

On 10 October 1983, it was listed as a provincial culture and relics site.

It was open to outsiders on September 29, 1999.

== Gallery ==
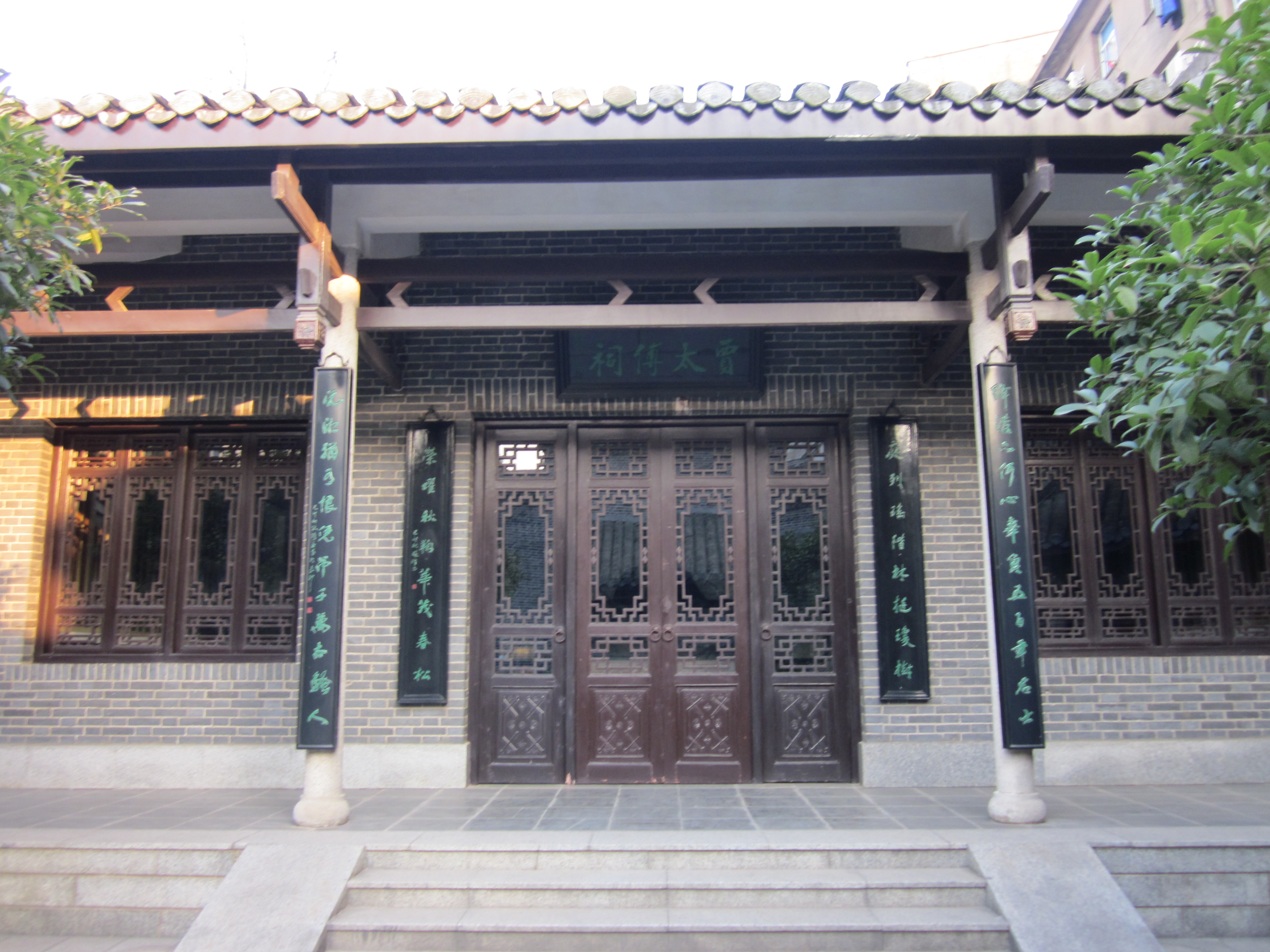
the Grand Preceptor Temple

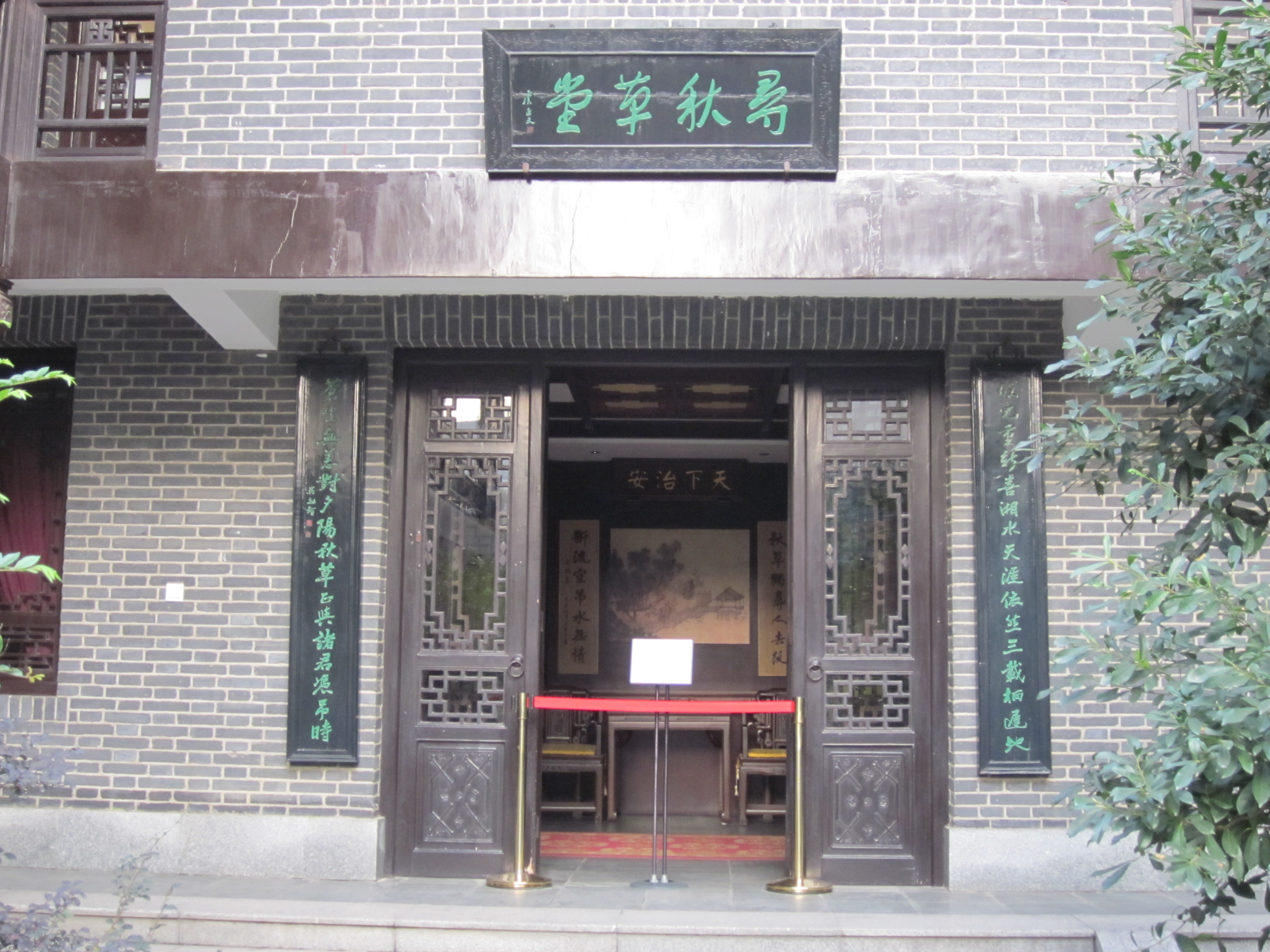
the Xunqiu Cottage

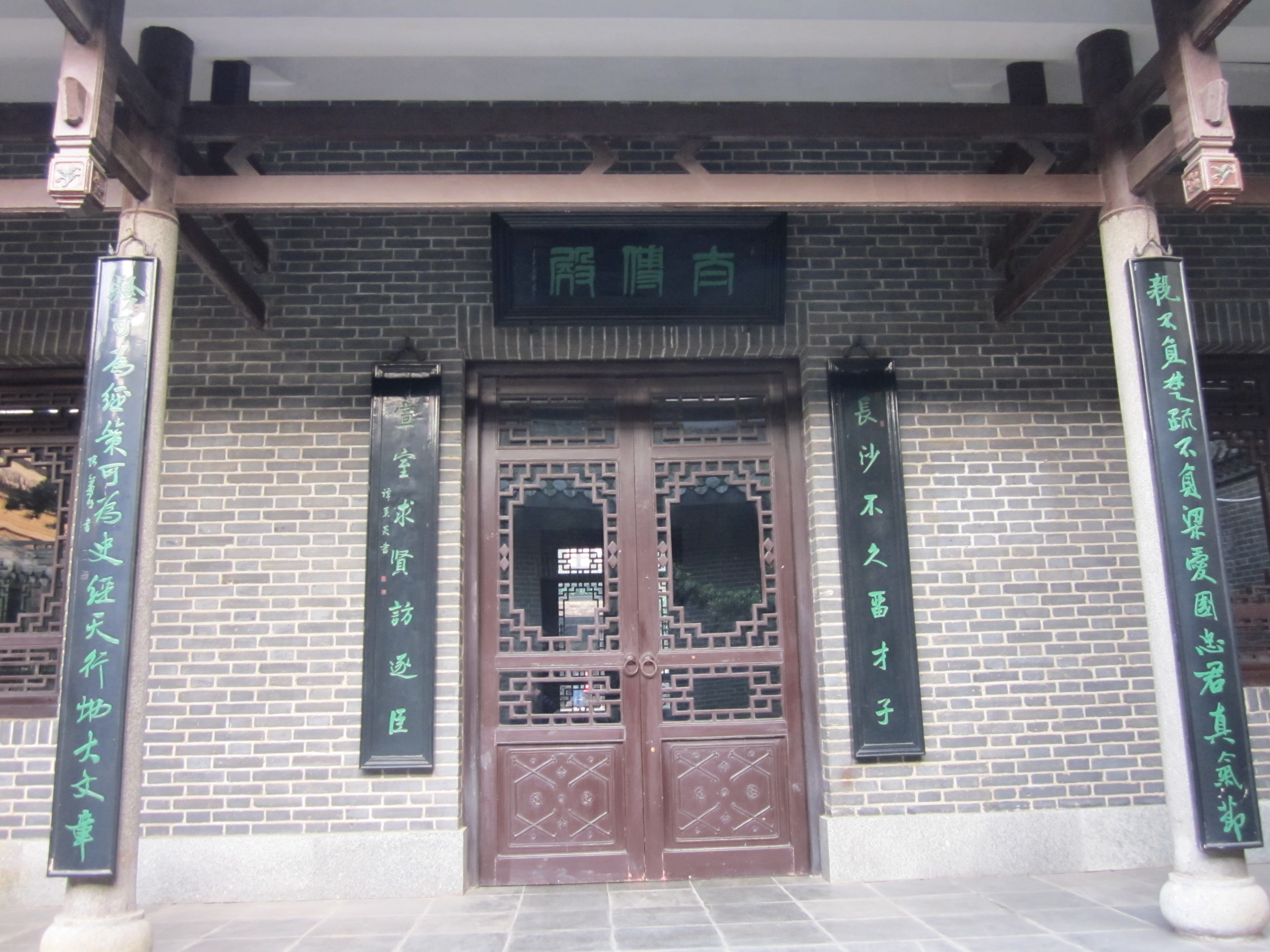
the Grand Preceptor Hall

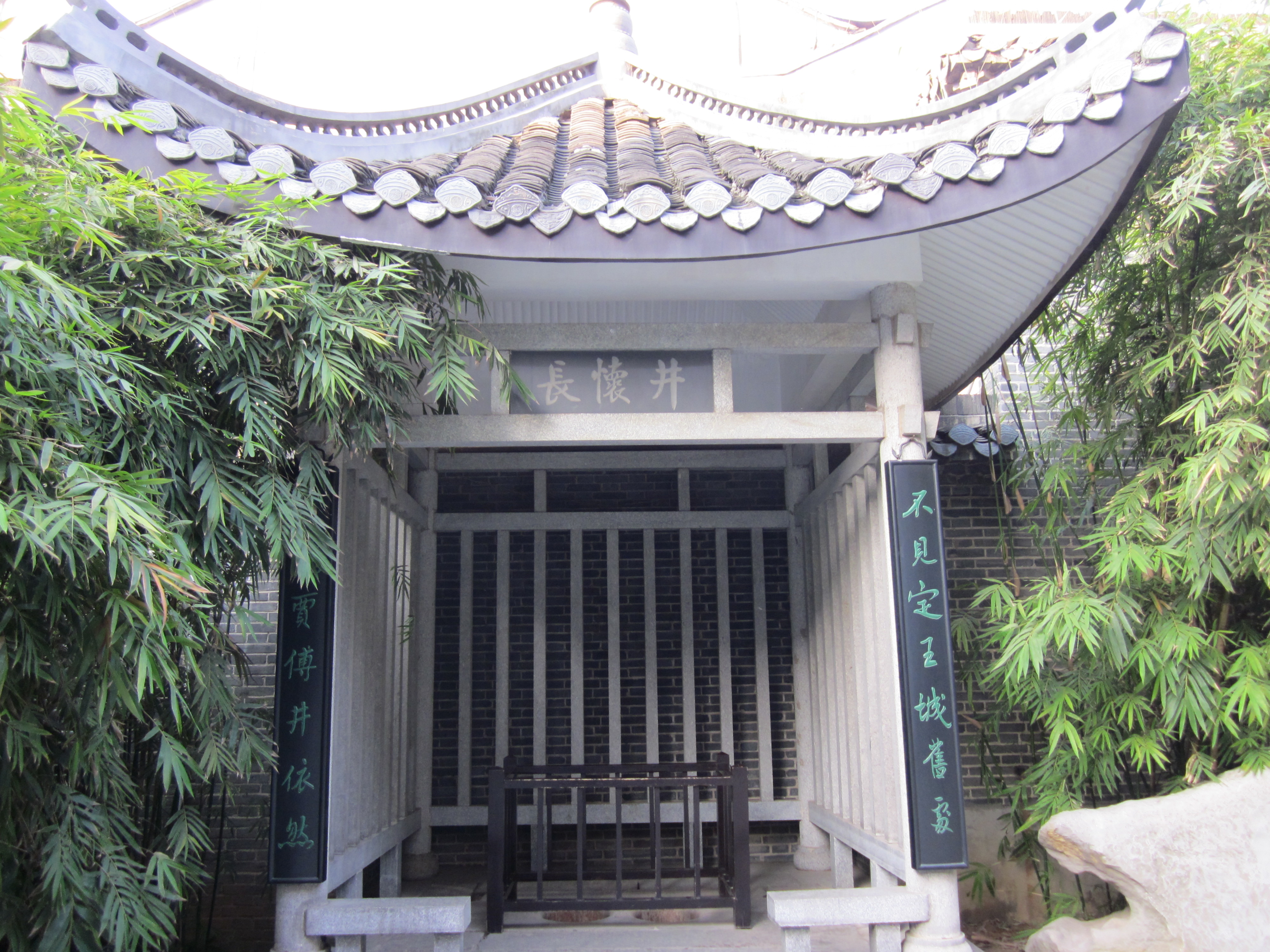
the Grand Preceptor Well

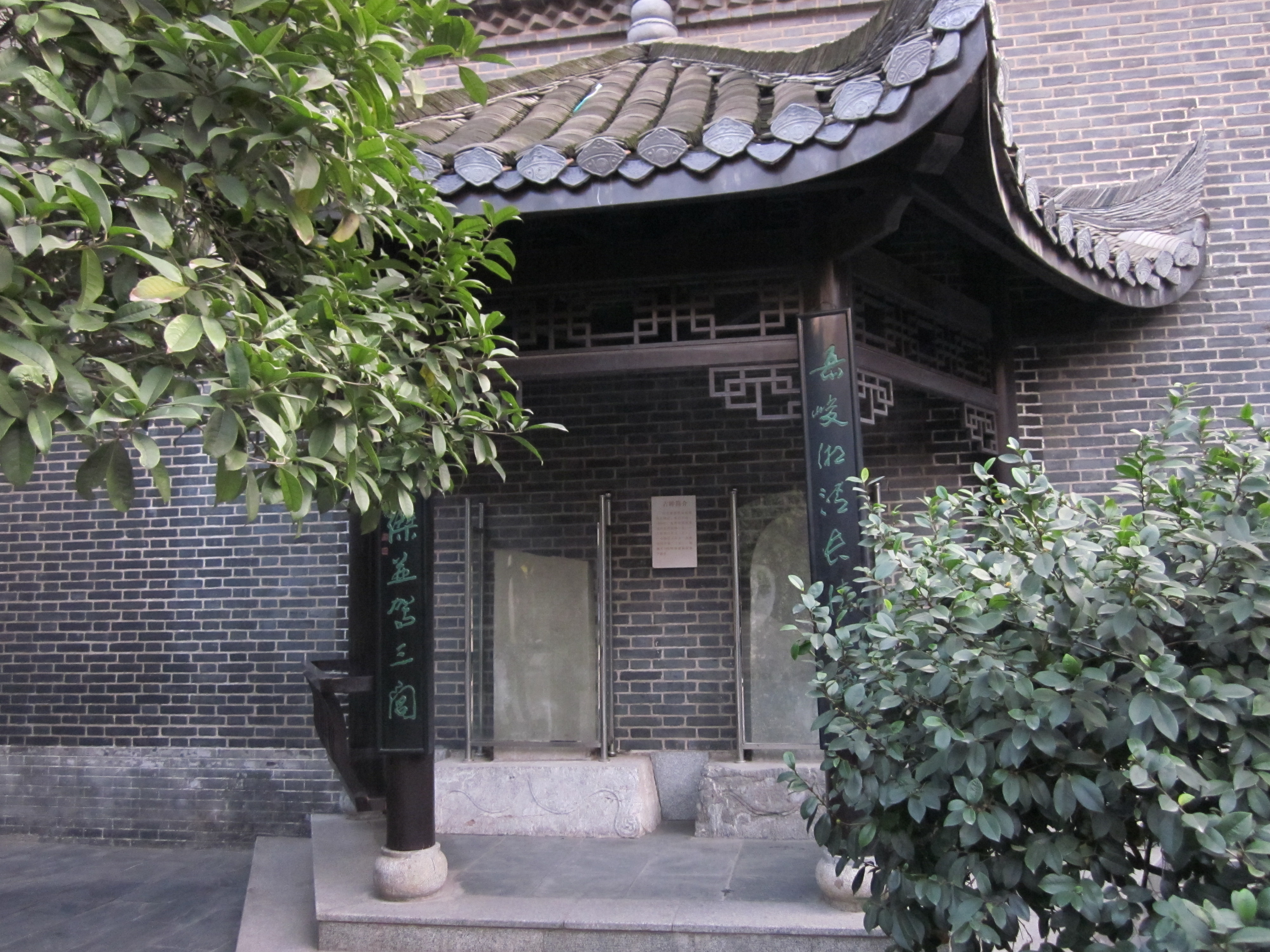
the Old Tablet Pavilion
