= Du Fu River Pavilion =

Memorial pavilion in China

- 杜甫江阁
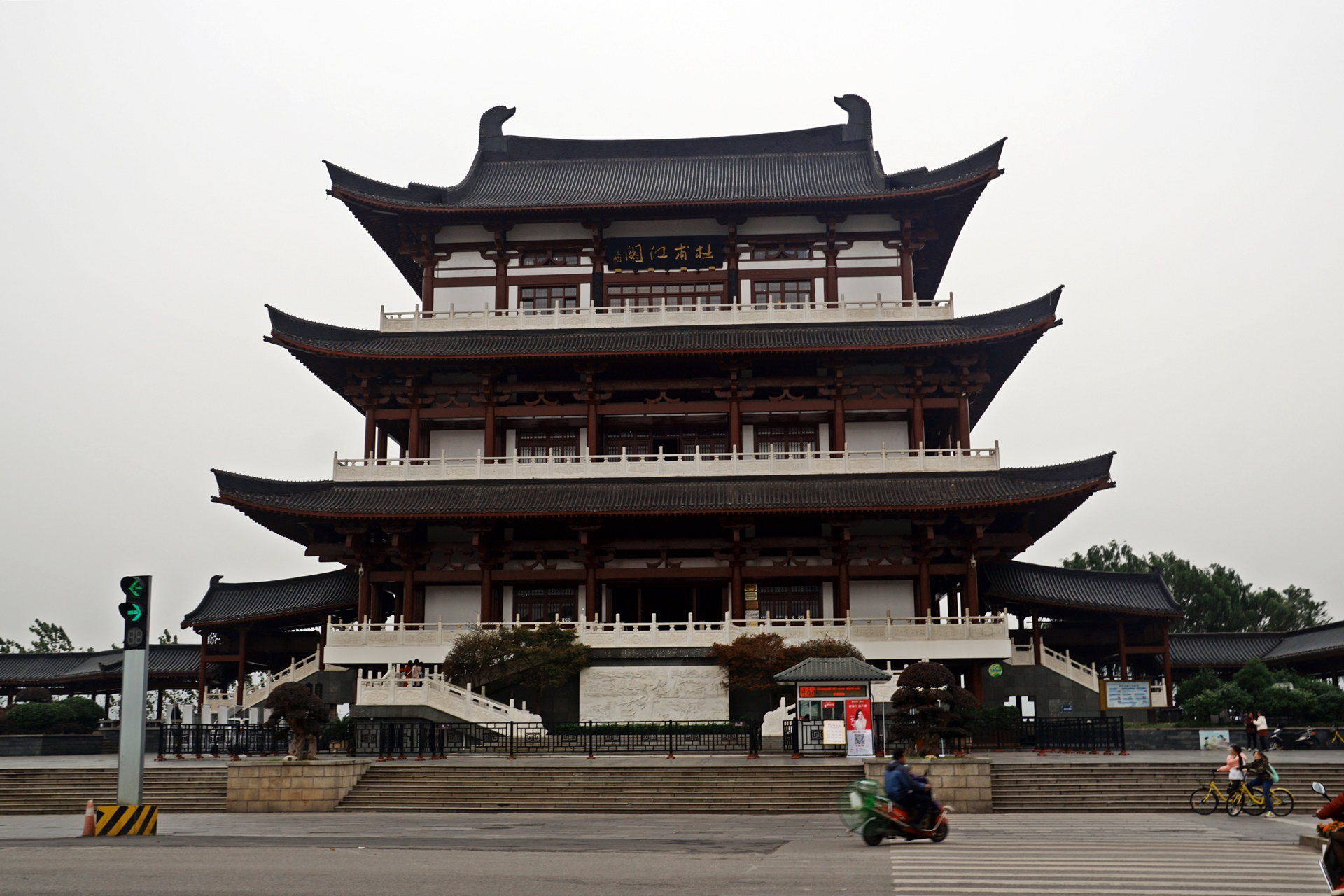
- Du Fu River Pavilion in 2017

- Location within Hunan

General information
- Type: Tang-style pavilion
- Architectural style: Chinese architecture
- Location: Tianxin District of Changsha, Hunan, China
- Coordinates: 28°11′26″N 112°58′31″E
- Groundbreaking: 2004
- Opened: 19 September 2005
- Owner: Government of Changsha

Height
- Height: 18-metre (59 ft)

Technical details
- Material: Wood, bricks, cement
- Floor area: 3,800 m^{2} (41,000 sq ft)
- Grounds: 6,000 m^{2} (65,000 sq ft)

Du Fu River Pavilion (simplified Chinese: 杜甫江阁; traditional Chinese: 杜甫江閣; pinyin: Dù Fǔ Jiāng Gé) is a Chinese pavilion located on the bank of Xiang River, in Tianxin District of Changsha, Hunan, China, built in memory of the Tang (618–907) poet Du Fu (712–770). It is a part of Xiang River Scenery Belt. The pavilion occupies a building area of 3,800 square metres (41,000 sq ft) and the total area is over 6,000 square metres (65,000 sq ft). It is adjacent to Orange Isle and Yuelu Mountain.

== History ==
In the autumn of 768, Du Fu came to Tanzhou (now Changsha) from Chengdu Prefecture, crossed over to his friend Wei Zhijin (韦之晋), prefectural governor of Tanzhou. When he arrived, his friend had died. At first he lived on a boat. Later, he rented a house by the Xiang River and named it "River Pavilion" (江阁). Two years later, he died of illness in a boat on the Xiang River.

During the Kangxi period (1662–1722) of the Qing dynasty (1644–1911), it was proposed to build a pavilion in memory of Du Fu, and then it was proposed one after another. In 2002, Changsha government decided to officially build it. Construction commenced in 2004 and was completed the following year. It was officially reopened to the public on 19 May 2005.

== Architecture ==
Du Fu River Pavilion is a typical Tang-style stories building with a high base (唐式高台楼阁建筑). The main pavilion is 18 metres (59 ft) with four layers of overhanging eaves (四层飞檐).

The first floor is a souvenir shop for poetry, calligraphy and painting. The second floor is Du Fu Memorial Hall. Inside the second floor, a statue of Du Fu stands in the middle of the hall. Paintings are used on the wall to introduce the Du Fu's life. On both sides of the hall are the works of Zhang Daqian, Lin Sanzhi and other calligraphers. The third floor is the exhibition hall of Changsha historical celebrities. The fourth floor is the reception hall and antique exhibition hall.
