= Former Residence of Li Fuchun =

- 李富春故居
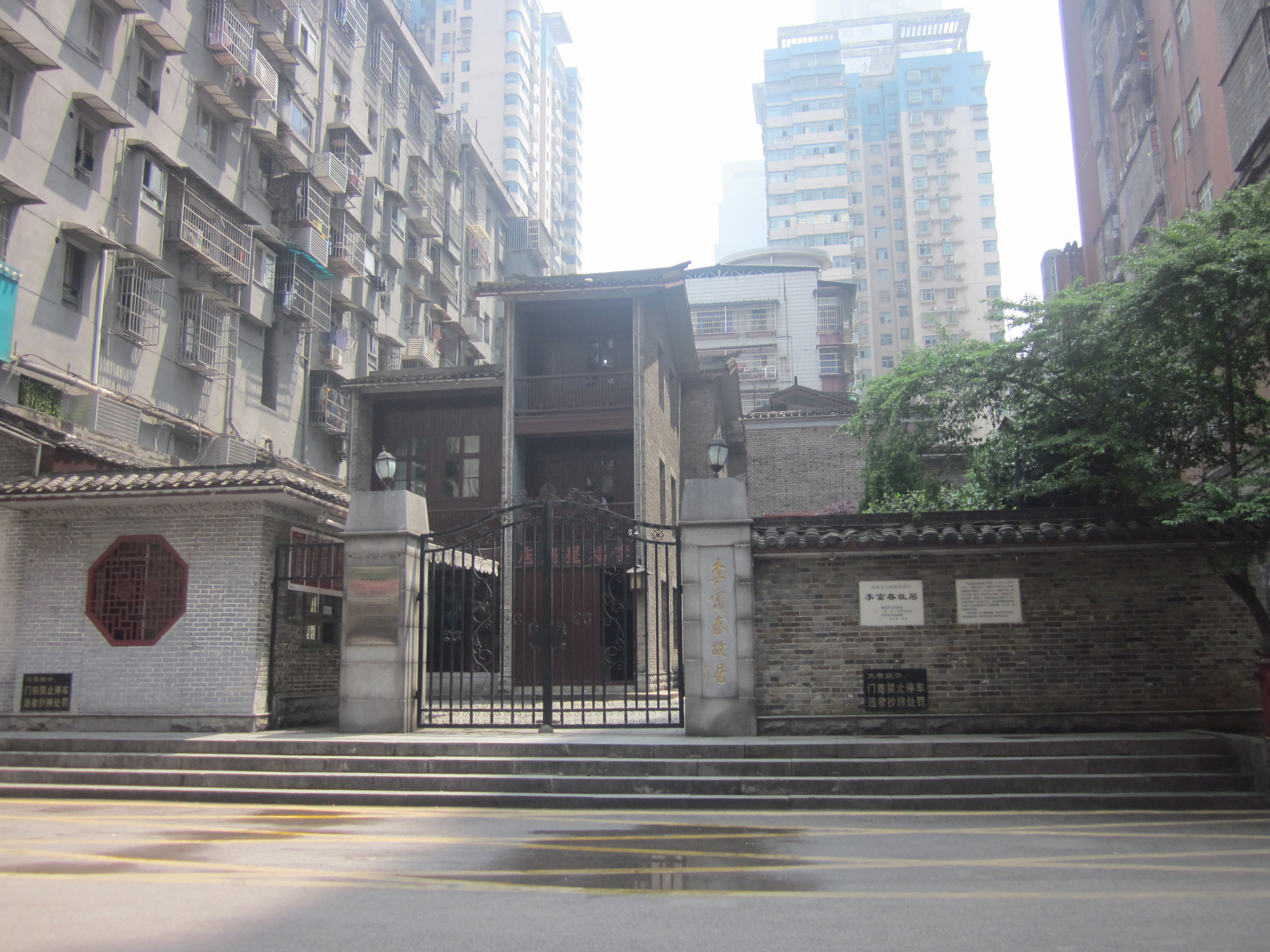
- Entrance of the Former Residence of Li Fuchun

- Location within Hunan Former Residence of Li Fuchun (China)

General information
- Type: Traditional folk houses
- Location: Tianxin District, Changsha, Hunan, China
- Coordinates: 28°11′53″N 112°58′50″E
- Groundbreaking: January 1993 (reconstruction)
- Opened: 22 May 1995
- Renovated: May 1995 (reconstruction)
- Owner: Government of Changsha

Height
- Architectural: Chinese architecture

Technical details
- Material: Wood and brick
- Floor area: 480 m^{2} (5,200 sq ft)

The Former Residence of Li Fuchun or Li Fuchun's Former Residence (Chinese: 李富春故居; pinyin: Lǐ Fùchūn Gùjū) is the birthplace of Li Fuchun, who was a member of the Politburo Standing Committee of the Chinese Communist Party and Vice Premier of the People's Republic of China. It covers a building area of about 480 square metres (5,200 sq ft), embodies buildings such as the Life Stories Exhibition Hall of Li Fuchun (李富春生平业绩陈列馆) and the Li Fuxing Fan Shop (李福星扇店).

== History ==
The former residence was originally built in late Qing dynasty (1644–1911) by Li Shixin (李世馨), grandfather of Li Fuchun. The first floor was a shop named "Li Fuxing Fan Shop", which means good luck. It dealt with general goods such as fans and cotton wadding; the back was the workshop; the second and third floors were houses.

On May 22, 1900, Li Fuchun was born in the former residence. In the 1920s, Li Shixin sold the former residence to a family surnamed Li due to his son Li Shuyun (李曙云; father of Li Fuchun) didn't want to run a business. During the Second Sino-Japanese War, a disastrous fire in 1938 destroyed the whole buildings.

In October 1992, the Publicity Department of the Chinese Communist Party sent separate letters to the State Planning Commission of China and the Hunan Provincial Committee of the Chinese Communist Party, which replied that they agreed to repair the former residence. Planning and reconstruction began in January 1993 and was completed in May 1995. In April 1995, Jiang Zemin, the then General Secretary of the Chinese Communist Party and Chairman of the Central Military Commission, personally inscribed "Former Residence of Li Fuchun". On May 22, 1995, it was officially opened to the public.

On January 24, 2011, it was designated as a provincial cultural relic preservation organ by the Hunan Provincial Government.

== Gallery ==
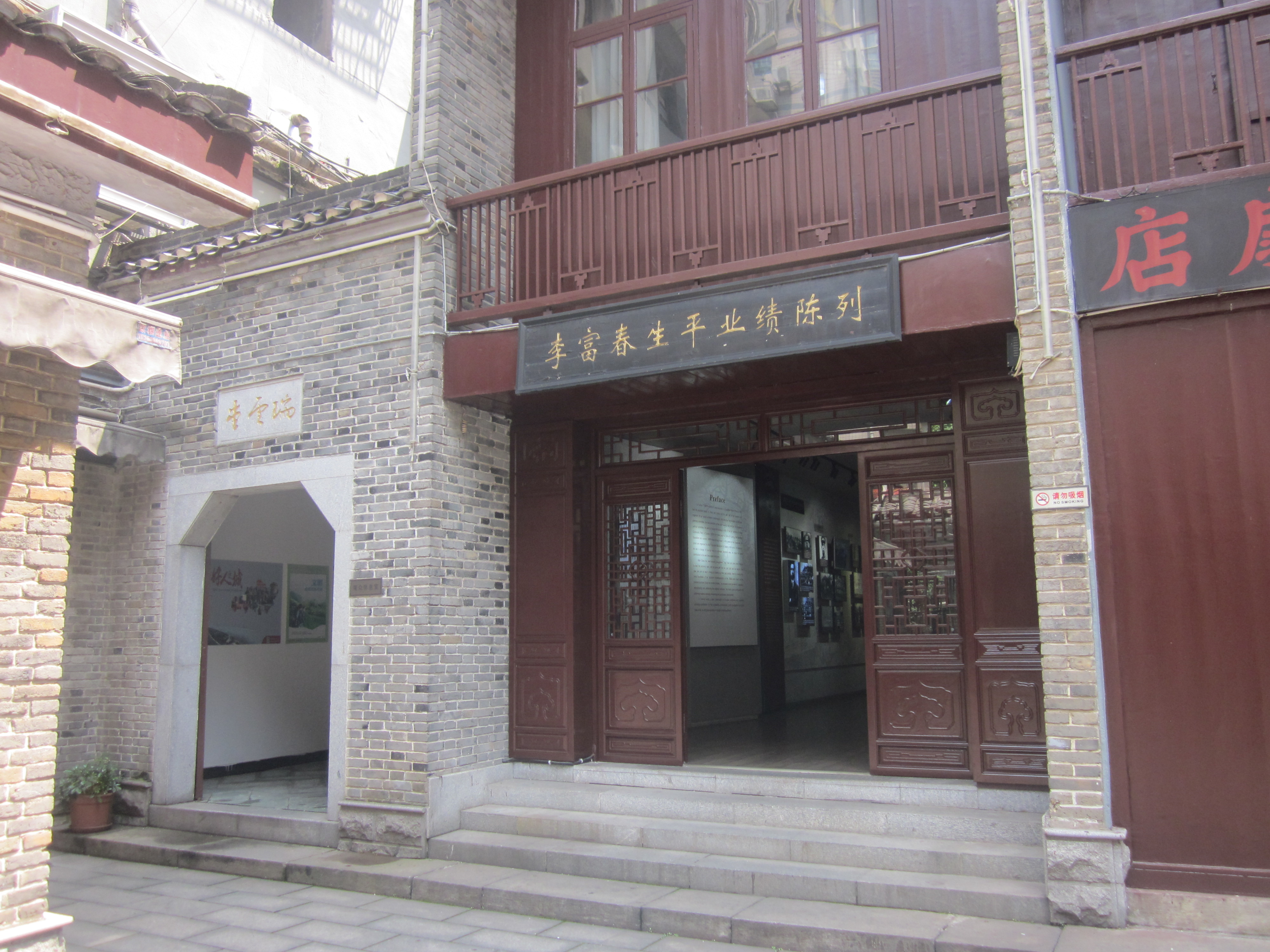
Life Stories Exhibition Hall of Li Fuchun

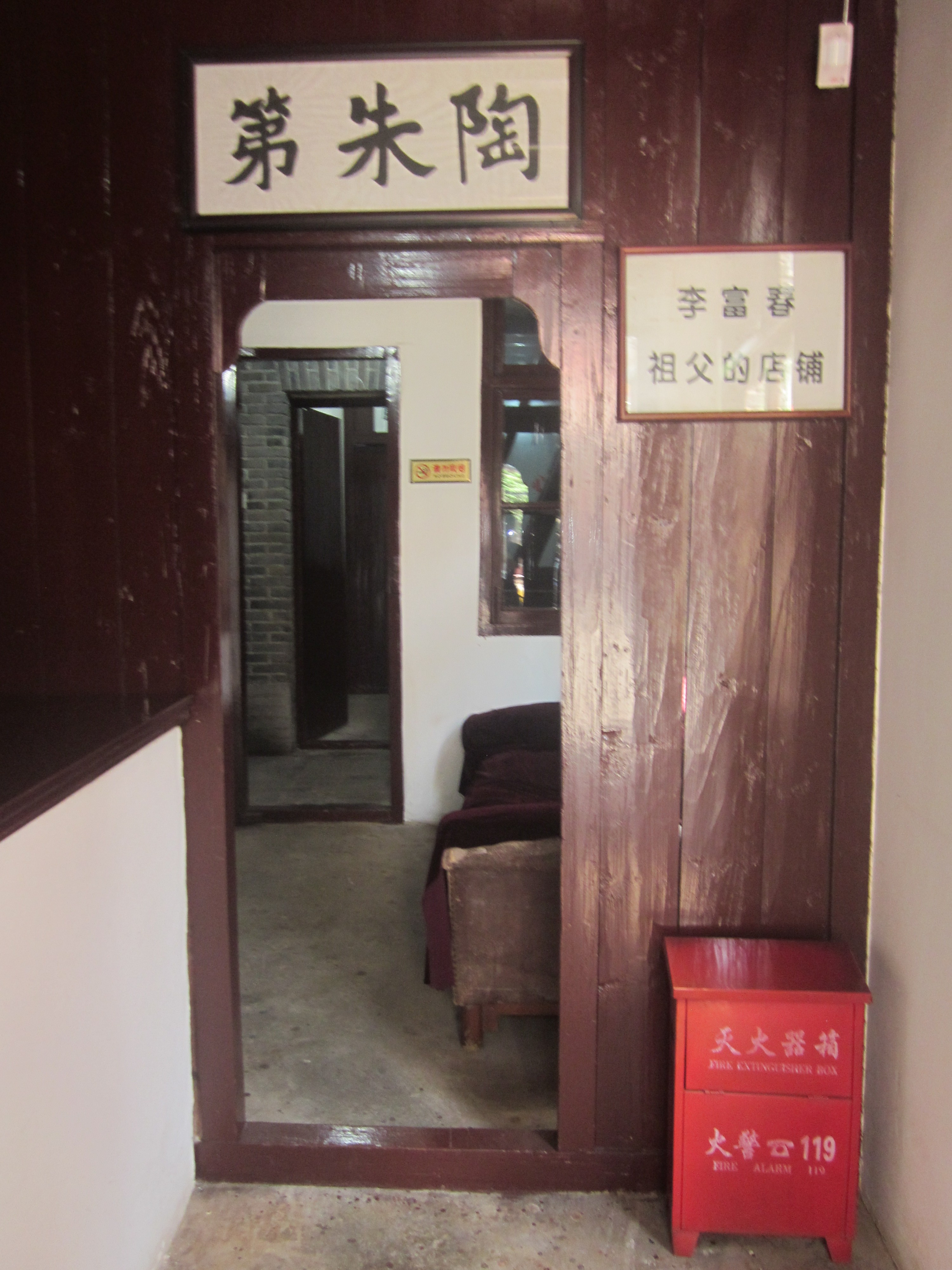
Li Fuxing Fan Shop

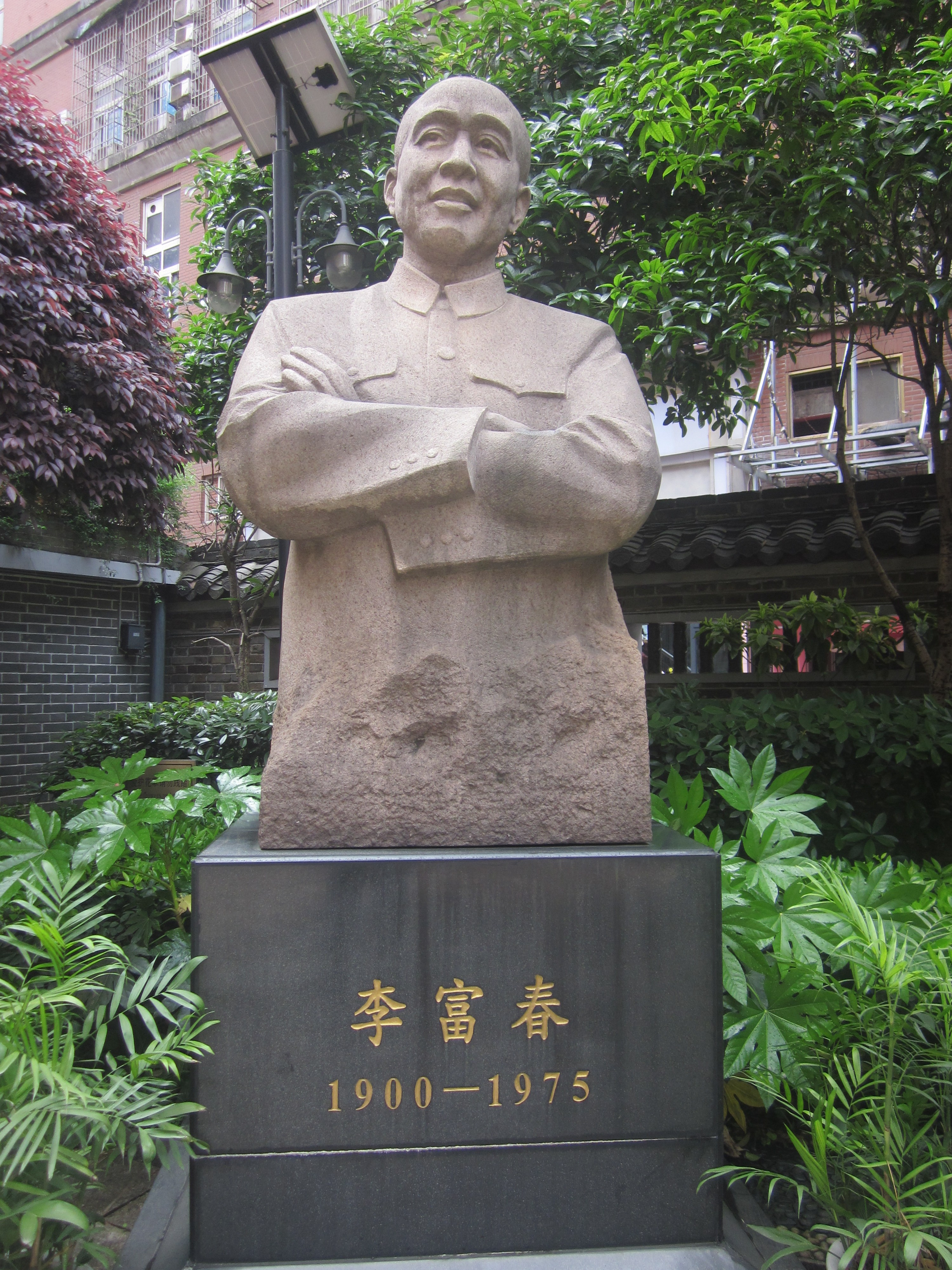
Statue of Li Fuchun.
