= Datuopu Subdistrict =

Datuopu Subdistrict 大托铺街道
- Subdistrict
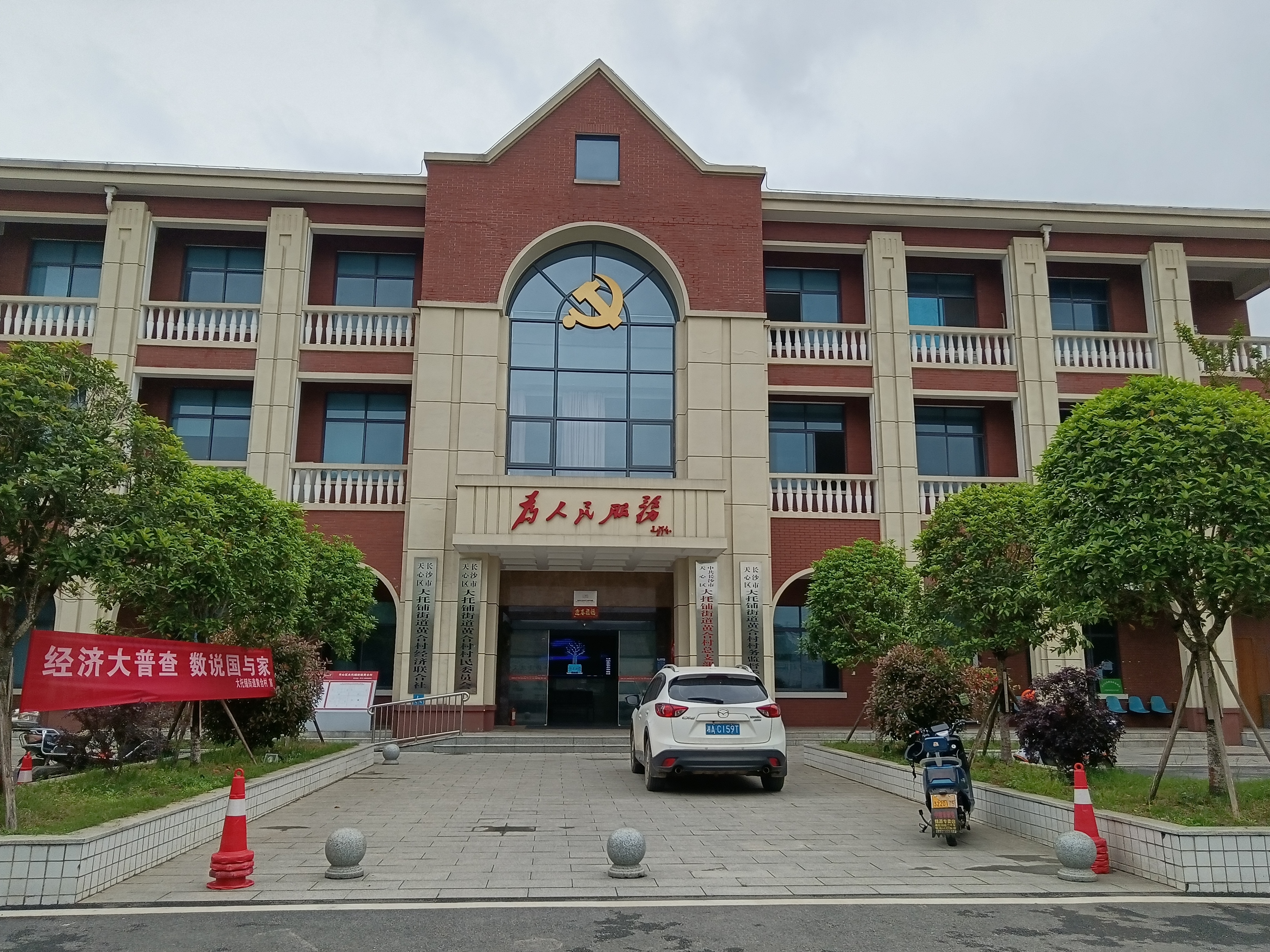
- CCP Huanghe Village Residents Committee

- Location in Hunan.
- Coordinates: 28°05′21″N 112°58′59″E
- Country: People's Republic of China
- Province: Hunan
- Prefecture-level city: Changsha
- District: Tianxin District

Area
  - Total: 15.12 km^{2} (5.84 sq mi)

Population (2021)
  - Total: 15,920
  - Density: 1,053/km^{2} (2,727/sq mi)
- Time zone: UTC+08:00 (China Standard)
- Postal code: 410208
- Area code: 0731

Chinese name
- Simplified Chinese: 大托铺街道
- Traditional Chinese: 大托鋪街道
Transcriptions
Standard Mandarin
- Hanyu Pinyin: Dàtuōpù Jiēdào

Datuopu Subdistrict (Chinese: 大托铺街道) is a subdistrict in Tianxin District of Changsha, Hunnan, China. As of the 2021 census it had a population of 15,920 and an area of 15.12-square-kilometre (5.84 sq mi).

== Administrative division ==
As of 2023, the subdistrict is divided into four villages:

- Huanghe Village (黄合村)
- Guijing Village (桂井村)
- Xinglong Village (兴隆村)
- Datuo New Village (大托新村)

== History ==
The region was known as Datuo Township/ Town (大托乡（镇）) and belonged to Changsha County in history. It came under the jurisdiction of Tianxin District in 1996. In 2012, Tianxin District abolished Datuo Town and separated it into Heishipu Subdistrict, Datuopu Subdistrict, and Xianfeng Subdistrict.

== Geography ==
Datuopu Subdistrict is surrounded by Heishipu Subdistrict on the north, Xiang River on the west, Heishipu Subdistrict and Xianfeng Subdistrict on the east, and Nantuo Subdistrict on the south.

The Xiang River flows through the west of Datuopu Subdistrict.

== Economy ==
The local economy is primarily based upon agriculture and local industry.

== Demographics ==
Historical population
| Year | Pop. | ±% |
|---|---|---|
| 2012 | 14,300 | — |
| 2021 | 15,920 | +11.3% |

The 2021 census reported the town had a population of 15,920.

== Transportation ==
The Xiang River South Road (湘江南路) passes across the subdistrict north to south.

The County Road X055 (055县道) is a north–south road in the subdistrict.

The Changsha Ring Expressway (长沙绕城高速公路) runs west–east along the north side of Datuopu Subdistrict.

Datuopu railway station (大托铺火车站) serves the town, which was originally built in 1911.

Datuopu Airport (大托铺机场) was built in the 1950s.
