= The Faults of Qin =

Chronicle of Chinese Emperor Qin Shi Huang's tyranny

- Traditional Chinese: 過秦論
- Simplified Chinese: 过秦论
- Literal meaning: Disquisition Finding Fault with Qin
Transcriptions
Standard Mandarin
- Hanyu Pinyin: guò Qín lùn
Middle Chinese
- Middle Chinese: /kuɑ d͡ziɪn luən^{H}/

The famous Han poet and statesman Jia Yi concluded his essay The Faults of Qin with what was to become the standard Confucian judgment of the reasons for Qin's collapse. Jia Yi's essay, admired as a masterpiece of rhetoric and reasoning, was copied into two great Han histories and has had a far-reaching influence on Chinese political thought as a classic illustration of Confucian theory. He explained the ultimate weakness of Qin as a result of its ruler's ruthless pursuit of power, the precise factor which had made it so powerful; for as Confucius had taught, the strength of a government ultimately is based on the support of the people and virtuous conduct of the ruler.
