= Qingyuan, Changsha =

Qingyuan Subdistrict 青园街道
- Subdistrict
- Location in Hunan
- Coordinates: 28°07′20″N 113°00′02″E
- Country: People's Republic of China
- Province: Hunan
- Prefecture-level city: Changsha
- District: Tianxin

Area
  - Total: 3.6 km^{2} (1.4 sq mi)

Population (2015)
  - Total: 59,000
  - Density: 16,000/km^{2} (42,000/sq mi)
- Time zone: UTC+8 (China Standard)

Qingyuan Subdistrict (simplified Chinese: 青园街道; traditional Chinese: 青園街道; pinyin: Qīngyuán Jiēdào) is an urban subdistrict and the seat of Tianxin District, Changsha City, Hunan Province, China. The subdistrict is located in the east central part of the district. It is bordered to the north by Wenyuan Subdistrict, to the northwest by Xinkaipu Subdistrict, to the west and the southwest by Heishipu Subdistrict, to the south by Guihuaping Subdistrict, to the southeast and the east by Dongjing and Jingwanzi Subdistricts of Yuhua District. Qingyuan covers 3.6 km^{2} (1.4 sq mi) with a population of about 59,000. It is divided into four communities under its jurisdiction.
