= Tianxin, Changsha =

Tianxin 天心区
- District
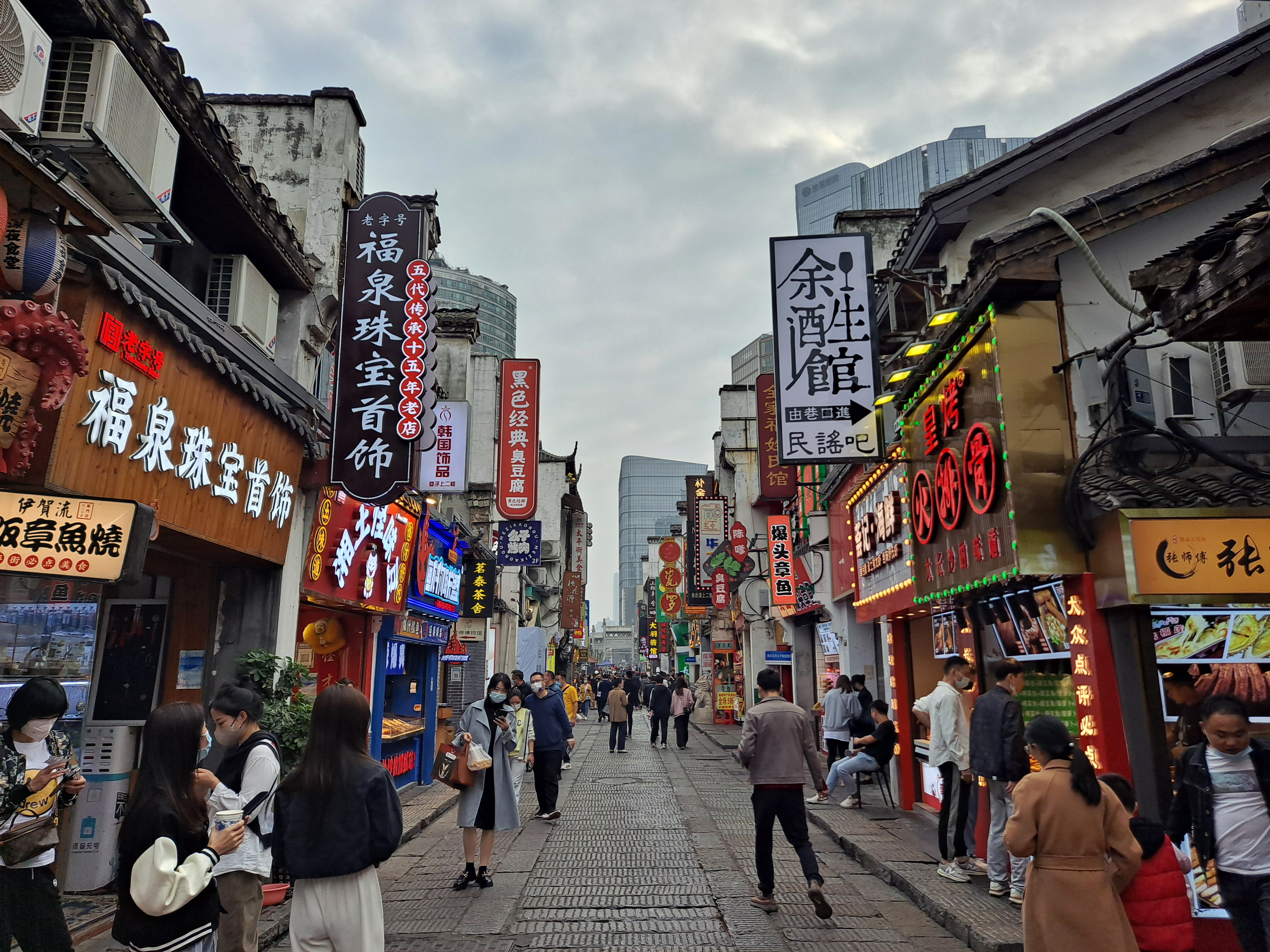
- Taiping Street

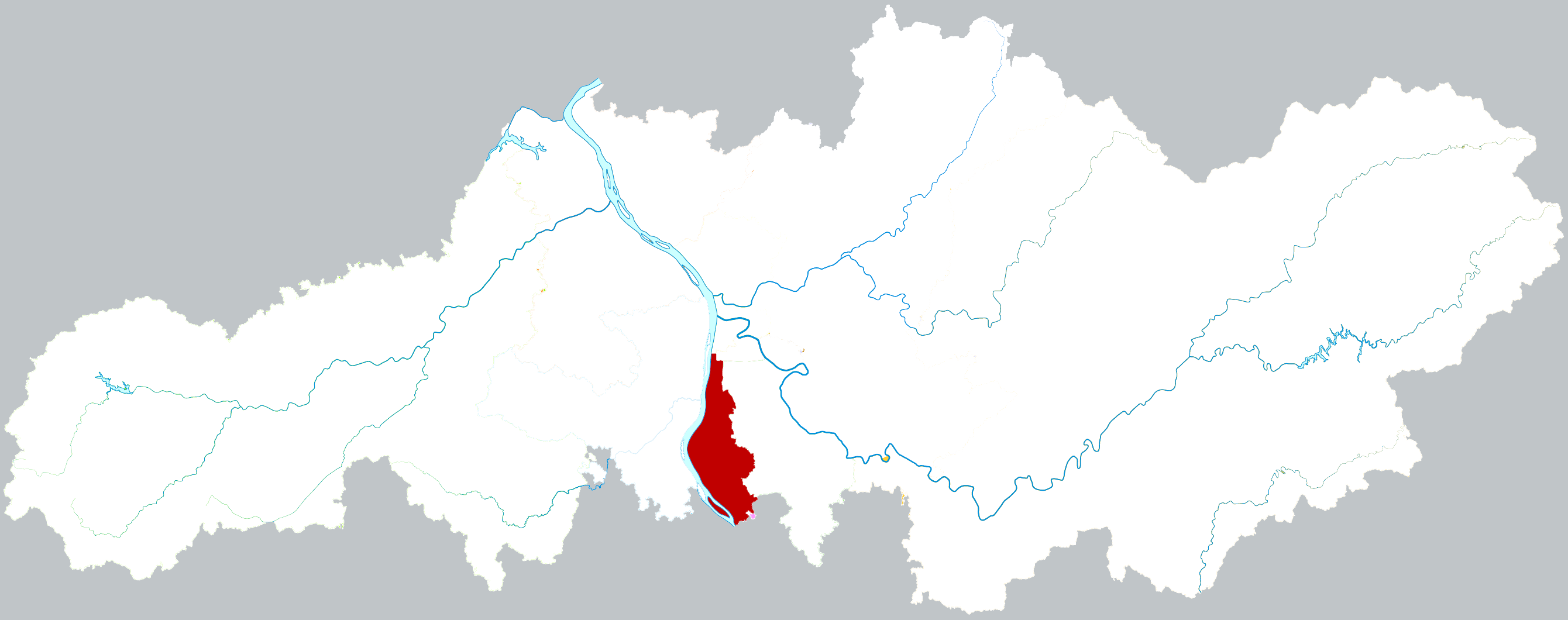
- Location of Tianxin District within Changsha

- Location in Hunan
- Coordinates: 28°06′52″N 112°59′24″E
- Country: People's Republic of China
- Province: Hunan
- Prefecture-level city: Changsha
- Seat: Qingyuan

Area
  - Total: 74 km^{2} (29 sq mi)

Population (2007)
  - Total: 420,000
  - Density: 5,700/km^{2} (15,000/sq mi)
- Time zone: UTC+8 (China Standard)

Tianxin District (simplified Chinese: 天心区; traditional Chinese: 天心區; pinyin: Tiānxīn Qū) is one of six urban districts of the prefecture-level city of Changsha, the capital of Hunan Province, China. The district is bordered by Yuetang District of Xiangtan to the south, Yuhua District to the east, Furong and Kaifu districts to the north, Yuelu District across the Xiang river to the west. Located in the southern central Changsha, Tianxin covers 141.05 km^{2} (54.46 sq mi) with population of 604,600 (as of 2016). The district has 14 subdistricts under its jurisdiction, with its administrative centre at Qingyuan Subdistrict.

== History ==
Tianxin District was formed on 22 April 1996 as a result of adjusting the administrative districts of Changsha. It covers most of the historic South District, including Yunanjie (裕南街), Jinpenling (金盆岭), Chengnanlu (城南路), Shuyuanlu (书院路) and Nandalu (南大路) 5 subdistricts, Pozijie (坡子街) and Xueyuanjie (学院街) two subdistricts of the historic West District, Shiren (石人), Xinkai (新开) and Yuchang (渔场) 3 villages of Yuhuating Township (雨花亭乡) and Datuo Township (大托乡) of the historic Suburb District.

Muyun (暮云) and Nantuo (南托) subdistricts of Changsha County were added to Tianxin District on 14 January 2015.

== Subdivisions ==
According to the No.2 Notice on adjustment of administrative divisions of Hunan Province in 2015 published on February 27, 2015, Tianxin has 14 subdistricts under its jurisdiction. They are:

14 subdistricts

- Chennanlu (城南路街道)
- Chilinglu (赤岭路街道)
- Datuopu (大圫铺街道)
- Guihuaping (桂花坪街道)
- Heishipu (黑石铺街道)
- Jinpengling (金盆岭街道)
- Muyun (暮云街道)
- Nantuo (南圫街道)
- Pozijie (坡子街街道)
- Qingyuan (青园街道)
- Wenyuan (文源街道)
- Xianfeng (先锋街道)
- Xinkaipu (新开铺街道)
- Yunanjie (裕南街街道)

== Economy ==
According to preliminary accounting of the statistical authority, the gross domestic product of Tianxin District in 2017 was 87,674 million yuan (12,985 million US dollars), up by 9.4 percent over the previous year. Of this total, the value added of the primary industry was 165 million yuan (24 million US dollars), up by -19 percent, that of the secondary industry was 27,436 million yuan (4,064 million US dollars), up by 3.8 percent and that of the tertiary industry was 60,073 million yuan (8,897 million US dollars), up by 12.3 percent. The value added of the primary industry accounted for 0.19 percent of the GDP; that of the secondary industry accounted for 31.29 percent; and that of the tertiary industry accounted for 68.52 percent. The per capita GDP in 2017 was 134,088 yuan (19,860 US dollars).

In 2015, the streets of Muyun and Nanto in Changsha County were transferred to Changsha Tianxin District and changed into the Tianxin Economic Development Zone.

== Tourism ==
Tianxin District is a place of cultural and historical attractions, including Tianxin Pavilion, Du Fu River Pavilion, Former Residence of Jia Yi, Former Residence of Li Fuchun, Site of Hunan First Normal University, and Fiery Palace. Changsha Bamboo Slips Museum also play significant role in the tourism of Tianxin District. The district's most visited park is the Changsha Ecological Zoo.
