= Tianxin Pavilion =

- 天心阁
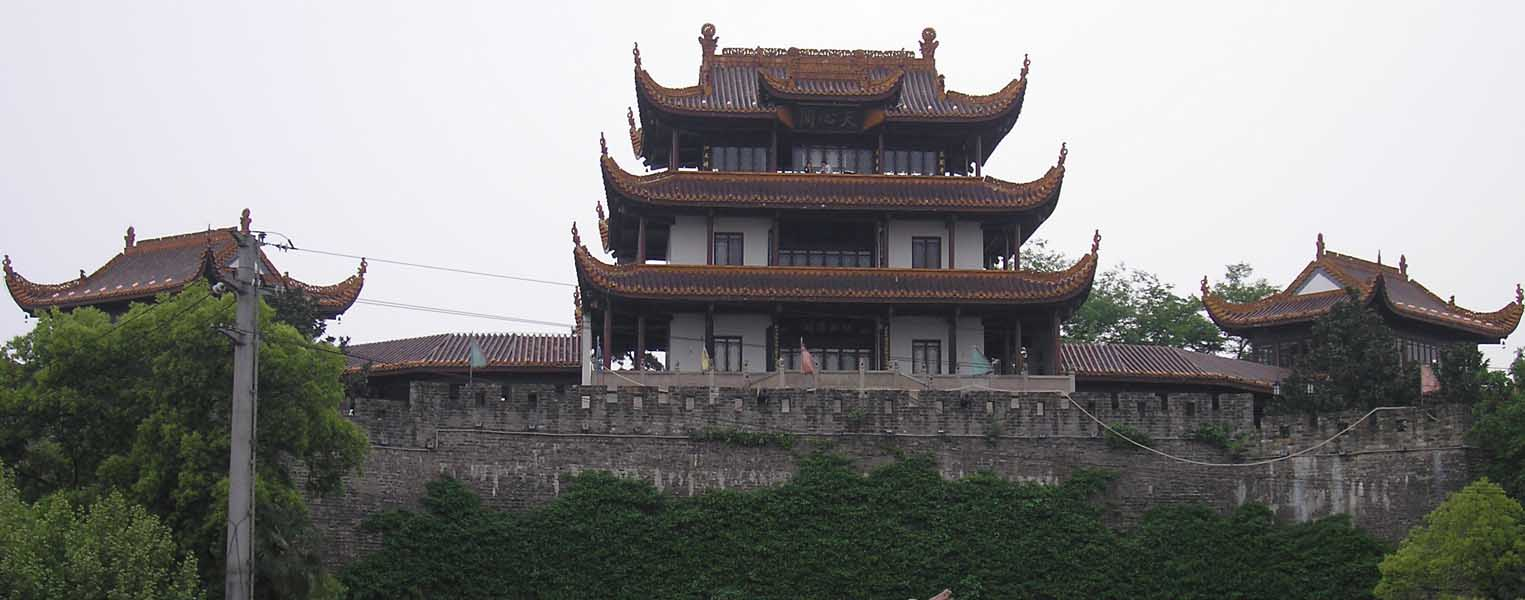
- Frontal view of Tianxin Pavilion.

- Location within Hunan

General information
- Type: Pavilion
- Location: Tianxin District, Changsha, Hunan, China
- Coordinates: 28°11′22″N 112°59′17″E
- Completed: Ming dynasty (1368–1644)
- Renovated: 1984
- Owner: Changsha government

Height
- Height: 14.6-metre (48 ft) (main pavilion); 10-metre (33 ft) (auxiliary pavilion)

Technical details
- Material: Brick and wood
- Floor area: 846 m^{2} (9,110 sq ft)

Tianxin Pavilion (simplified Chinese: 天心阁; traditional Chinese: 天心閣; pinyin: Tiānxīn Gé) is a historic Chinese pavilion located on the ancient city wall of Changsha, Hunan. The pavilion was first established in the 14th century, at the dawn of Ming dynasty (1368–1644), but because of war and natural disasters has been restored and renovated numerous times since then. The present version was completed in 1984. Tianxin Pavilion is composed of three pavilions, the three–stories main pavilion and the two–stories auxiliary pavilions. The two sides are connected with a long corridor. Alongside the Yueyang Tower, Pavilion of Prince Teng, Yellow Crane Tower, Stork Tower, Penglai Pavilion, Daguan Pavilion, Yuejiang Tower, Xi'an Bell and Drum Tower and Tianyi Pavilion, it is one of the "Ten Famous Chinese Historical and Cultural Towers and Pavilions" (十大中国历史文化名楼).

== History ==
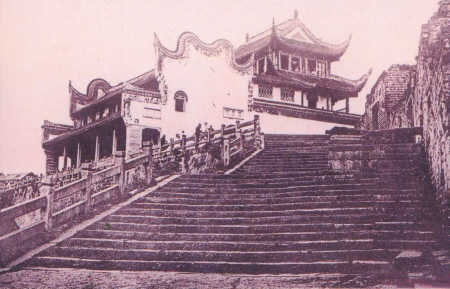
Tianxin Pavilion in 1912. The stone steps was built in the early Ming dynasty (1368–1644).

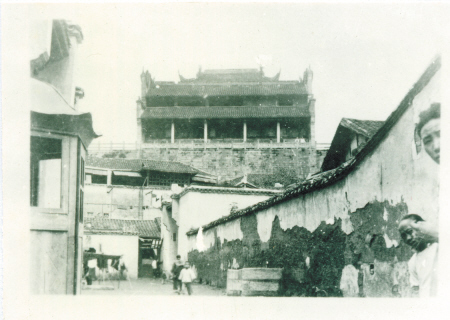
Tianxin Pavilion in the late Qing dynasty (1644–1912).

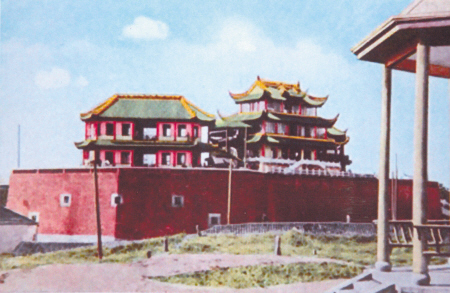
The Tianxin Pavilion in 1928.

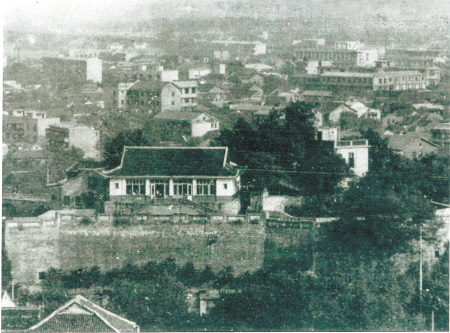
Tianxin Pavilion in 1938.

Tianxin Pavilion was first built in the early Ming dynasty (1368–1644).

In 1746, namely the 11th year of Qianlong period of the Qing dynasty (1644–1911), Yang Xibei (杨锡被) rebuilt on the site. Chengnan Academy (城南书院) equally famous along with Yuelu Academy was moved under the city wall of Tianxin Pavilion.

=== Taiping Rebellion ===
In 1852, namely the 2nd year of the Xianfeng period (1851–1861), led by Hong Xiuquan, the overwhelming Taiping army constantly defeated the Qing army and occupied cities.

On September 12, thousands of the Taiping troops gathered outside Changsha, the leader who commanded the army to attack Changsha was the West King Xiao Chaogui.

On September 13, Xiao ordered Li Kaifang and others to command 3,000 Taiping troops to constantly throw fire arrows and fire bombs into the city. Fire broke out everywhere in the city. Officials organized common people to save themselves while all the soldiers of the Qing army in the city climbed the city wall and were about to block the Taiping army who attacked the city in turmoil. But the Taiping army did not attack the city; they only threw fire arrows into the city and did not intend to climb the city wall until it got dark. At the same time, another batch of the Taiping army sneaked into the foot of the south city wall where Tianxin Pavilion was seated, and tensely dug many holes at the foot of the city wall to place mines and gunpowder. The defending troops on the city wall paid their attention to fire arrows that flew from the outside of the city and did not spot the Taiping army at the foot of the city wall.

In the morning of September 14, the Taiping army suddenly blew the bugles. After that, drums were sounded and guns were fired. 5,000 soldiers launched the attack formerly and set up countless ladder from the wall outside the south gate. The Taiping army soldiers carried broadswords and climbed up, but were chopped by the defending troops and fell down one by one. At that moment, thunderous explosive sounds were heard at the foot of the city wall. The gunpowder buried under the wall blew up and blasted two openings which were 10 metres (33 ft) or 13 metres (43 ft) wide in the city wall. Thousands of soldiers shouted, flocking to the openings. Hundreds of the Taiping troops soon rushed into the city. The Taiping soldiers outside the city were also flocking there. Just when the defending troops in the city panicked, 3,000 reinforcements from Chuxiong City of Yunnan arrived in time and rushed to the Taiping army from outside the city. The Taiping army could not figure out the number of the reinforcements at once and worried that they might be besieged. Xiao transmitted orders to withdraw troops.

As the reinforcements of the Qing army in Changsha increased constantly, both sides were in the stage of stalemate. But as the number of the Qing troops in the city increased, grain stored was consumed and running out. Some grain merchants seized the opportunity to raise the prices. It was very difficult for common people to buy grains too. Riots even broke out in some places. To prevent the famine victims from rising in rebellion, Zuo Zongtang, the then-assistant to Grand Coordinate Zhang Liangji recommended using the secret tunnel under Tianxin Pavilion. The secret tunnel led to the outside of the city and was dug for emergency needs long before the arrival of the Taiping army. Zhang Liangji immediately organized officials in the city to get out of the city and collect grain together with grain merchants and appointed the army to escort the grain at night. In ten days, a lot of grain was transported to the city from the tunnel of Tianxin Pavilion to solve the food shortage in the city. There was no shortage of provisions in the city, but the Taiping army had no intention of withdrawing.

One day, Zhang Liangji met alternate magistrate of Shaanxi Jiang Zhongyuan who came to rescue in Tianxin Pavilion. When discussing the battle, Jiang expressed his views and then put forward advice on the next combat. Pointing at the topographic map of Changsha hung on the wall, Jiang said: "Tianxin Pavilion in the south of the city is the command height of Changsha. Strong firepower should be arranged there to control the outside of the south gate. It the King of cannon weighing 5,000 jin inside Changsha city is moved to Tianxin Pavilion, it well benefit the progress of the battle a lot." Hearing this, Zhang Liangji handled it immediately. And the King of cannon was key to turning the battle around.

In October, by order of the Heavenly King Hong Xiuquan, the North King Wei Changhui of the Taiping army commanded 10,000 troops and hurried to the south gate of Changsha at double speed. They discussed and decided to launch an all-out attack. After the redeployment of Jiang Zhongyuan and others, their defense was fortified. The King of cannon was also carried to Tianxin Pavilion and destroyed all the houses outside the south of the city, making the Taiping army lose the places to hide and making them suffer a serious loss. At that time, Xiao Chaogui thought the main reason why their attack failed was that they did not destroy the cannons of the Qing army in Tianxin Pavilion. Therefore, he thought that before they attack the city again they must destroy Tianxin Pavilion first in order to make the south gate lose its support. He focused the attack on Tianxin Pavilion first. The Tomb of Lord Cai (蔡公坟) on the other side of Tianxin Pavilion was the commanding height in areas in the outer city of the south gate.

The next day Xiao Chaogui braved the gunfire and flying stones, mounted a horse in front and commanded the troops to attack the Tomb of Lord Cai. Suddenly the cannons in Tianxin Pavilion were sounded. The King of cannon first destroyed the headquarters of the Taiping army. With a loud boom heard, Xiao fainted and fell off the horse. Guards hurried to help him up. As his head was full of blood and the corners of his mouth trembled, he was unable to speak. The soldiers immediately carried him to the rear. Knowing that the chief commander was badly wounded by the bomb, the Taiping army which was attacking was thrown into confusion. Seeing that, Shi Dakai hurried to order soldiers to beat the gongs and withdraw the army. Xiao Chaogui, who was carried off the battlefield, died of a serious injury. After that, the Taiping army repeatedly attacked the city and failed and retreated at the end of November that year. Changsha, which held up for 81 days, was the only city which was not captured since the Taiping army entered and fought in Hunan.

After Xianfeng Emperor heard that, he issued an imperial decree and bestowed on the King of cannon the "Red Robe General" (红袍大将军). Tianxin Pavilion was slightly damaged during the war.

=== 1938 Changsha fire (Wenxi Fire) ===
On 7 July 1937, after the Marco Polo Bridge Incident, as the Imperial Japanese Army drove straight in, large quantities of people in the coastal and occupied areas moved to Changsha. It was then that a devastating disaster was approaching Changsha.

On 25 October 1938, Wuhan annexed by the Imperial Japanese Army, the rear base Hunan was turned into the front of the Second Sino-Japanese War.

On November 7, holding a military meeting in Changsha, Chiang Kai-shek said that all strategic materials that were not evacuated in time and ground architecture were used by the enemy after Wuhan fell. which fueled the strength of the enemy. Chiang Kai-shek directly telegraphed to Zhang Zhizhong, the then governor of Hunan government to tell him that if Changsha fell, (he) must burn and destroy the whole city. Zhang Zhizhong drew up a plan of burning the city. As Tianxin Pavilion was located at the highest point of the ancient city Changsha, it was undoubtedly chosen as the sign point of setting on fire.

Late at the night of November 12, outside of the south gate of Changsha, a hospital for wounded soldiers caught fire accidentally. As the geographical location and height of the hospital were nearly the same as those of Tianxin Pavilion. At the sight of the fire, team members that were assigned everywhere in the city to set on fire misunderstood it as the fire signal of Tianxin Pavilion, so they lit up fire at the same time. Before long, the entire Changsha city was on fire. Tianxin Pavilion stood loftily on the city wall was not immune from the fire. The fire rose up around the main building of Tianxin Pavilion. In less than one hour, Tianxin Pavilion was engulfed by the fire. The big fire burnt for five whole nights and five whole days, from the city wall of Tianxin Pavilion, there were dozens of meters of broken walls and debris everywhere which was miserable. As the code of the telegram on 12th was "Wen" (文), and the fire was set up at night, Xi (夕) means night, the fire was referred by people as "Wenxi Fire". Although Changsha was burnt and destroyed by Wenxi Fire, it did not stop the Imperial Japanese Army's attacks on Changsha. From September 1939 to December 1941, they massively attacked Changsha three times.

=== Reconstruction ===
In 1981, the CPC Changsha Municipal Committee and the Municipal Government of Changsha organized the reconstruction of Tianxin Pavilion. The construction took four years and lasted from 1981 to 1984. On December 1, 1984, the project was completed. To honor the officials and soldiers that died in the Second Sino-Japanese War, all sections of society donated enthusiastically to build a memorial building complex consisting Chonglie Tower (崇烈塔), Chonglie Gate (崇烈门) and Chonglie Pavilion (崇烈亭) by the side of Tianxin Pavilion. In 2013, it was listed as a "Major National Historical and Cultural Sites in Hunan" by the State Council of China.

== Architecture ==
The tone of Tianxin Pavilion is dignified and powerful, and the style abandons the flourish and saves the primitive simplicity. The Tianxin Pavilion consists of the main pavilion, the south and north auxiliary pavilions, which known as Nanping (南屏) and Beigong (北拱). There are 62 Chinese guardian lions on the balustrade. The height of the three–stories main pavilion is 14.6 m (48 ft) and the height of the two–stories auxiliary pavilion are 10 m (33 ft). Connected by a long corridor in the middle.

=== Chonglie Pavilion ===
Chonglie Pavilion was built in 1946, its origin were Wupao Pavilion (午炮亭) and the National Humiliation Memorial Pavilion (国耻纪念亭). The pavilion is octagonal supported by 16 immense pillars. Under the eaves is a plaque with the Chinese characters "(崇烈亭)" written by Chiang Kai-shek.

=== Chonglie Gate ===
Chonglie Gate was built in 1946 with granite. It was donated by Chiang Kai-shek, Chen Cheng and Zhang Zhizhong. It is 8.5 m (28 ft) wide and 5.9 m (19 ft) high. Two couplet was engraved on the two side pillars. It says "氣吞胡羯，勇衛山河" and "犯難而忘其死，所欲有甚於生". The gate was completely destroyed in the Cultural Revolution and rebuilt in 2006.

=== Chonglie Tower ===
Chonglie Tower is also known as "White Tower" (白塔). It was built in 1946. The 6 m (20 ft) tall, hexagonal-based Chinese tower is made of granite.
