= Jia Yi =

Chinese essayist, poet and politician (c. 200–169 BCE)

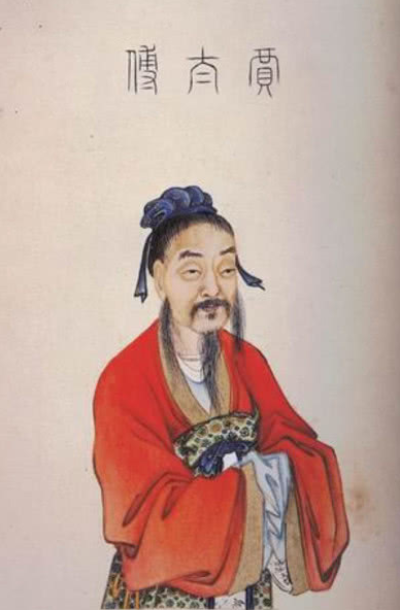
- 18th century depiction of Jia Yi
- Traditional Chinese: 賈誼
- Simplified Chinese: 贾谊
Transcriptions
Standard Mandarin
- Hanyu Pinyin: Jiǎ Yì
- Gwoyeu Romatzyh: Jea Yih
- Wade–Giles: Chia^{3} I^{4}
- IPA: [tɕjà î]
Yue: Cantonese
- Yale Romanization: Gáa Yih
- Jyutping: Gaa^{2} Ji^{6}
- IPA: [ka˧˥ ji˨]
Southern Min
- Tâi-lô: Ká Gī
Middle Chinese
- Middle Chinese: Kǽ Ngje
Old Chinese
- Baxter–Sagart (2014): *C.qˤ<r>aʔ ŋ(r)aj

Alternative Chinese name
- Traditional Chinese: 賈生
- Simplified Chinese: 贾生
- Literal meaning: "Scholar Jia"
Transcriptions
Standard Mandarin
- Hanyu Pinyin: Jiǎ shēng
Yue: Cantonese
- Yale Romanization: Gáa sāang
Southern Min
- Tâi-lô: Ká sing
Old Chinese
- Baxter–Sagart (2014): *C.qˤ<r>aʔ sreŋ

Jia Yi (Wade–Giles: Chia I; c. 200 – 169 BCE) was a Chinese essayist, poet and politician of the Western Han dynasty, best known as one of the earliest known writers of fu rhapsody and for his essay "Disquisition (on) Finding Fault with Qin" (Guò Qín Lùn; 過秦論), which criticises the Qin dynasty and describes Jia's opinions on the reasons for its collapse.

Early attracting the attention of a Governor Wu of Hunan for his literary skills, the promotion of Wu around 179 BCE saw Jia Yi appointed scholar of the classics. He was made Grand Master of the Palace one year later. Exiled through the influence of "old-guard officials", he was recalled on a pretext as a consultant on Taoist mysticism, but resistance to institutional reform saw him sent to tutor the Emperor Wen's favored youngest son Liu Yi. He is said to have died of grief following the accidental death of Liu Yi on horseback.

Although often recalled modernly for his Disquisitions, his most famous work may actually be his poem On the Owl, which draws on proverbs and parables from the Tao Te Ching and Zhuangzi, and his Lament for Qu Yuan, containing political and educational insights. Author of the treatise Xinshu (新書), the Book of Han's Journal on Literature attributes thirty eight writings to him.

== Life ==
Jia Yi's biography is contained in Volume 84 of the Records of the Grand Historian. Jia Yi was born about 200 BCE in Luoyang, though some sources suggest his birth may have been a year earlier in about 201 BCE. As a youth, Jia became well known in his home county for his literary skills and ability to recite the Chinese Classics. His precociousness caught the attention of "Venerable Wu" (Wu gong 吳公), the local governor and a prominent Legalist scholar who had been a student of the Qin dynasty official Li Si.

Wu brought Jia onto his staff, and when Wu was promoted to Commandant of Justice in 179 BCE, he recommended Jia to Emperor Wen of Han as a scholar of the Classics. Emperor Wen made Jia a "professor" (bóshì 博士), and within one year had him promoted to Grand Master of the Palace (tàizhōng dàfū 太中大夫), a relatively high-ranking position at the imperial court.

Upon assuming his new position, Jia began submitting proposals for institutional reforms—including a proposal to require vassal lords to actually reside in their fiefs and not at the capital. He advised Wen to teach his heir to use what may very well be Shen Buhai's administrative method, so as to be able to "supervise the functions of the many officials and understand the usages of government." He was frequently opposed by a group of older officials who had been early supporters of Liu Bang, the founder of the Han dynasty, and who continued to hold important positions under Emperor Wen.

This old-guard faction, probably feeling that Jia was a threat to their own positions, protested when Emperor Wen was considering promoting Jia to a ministerial post, saying that Jia was "young and just beginning his studies, yet he concentrates all his desires on arrogating authority to himself, and has brought chaos and confusion to everything." The emperor, bowing to the faction's pressure, gradually stopped seeking Jia's advice, and in 176 BCE exiled Jia to the southern Changsha Kingdom (roughly corresponding to modern Hunan Province) to serve as Grand Tutor to its young king Wu Chan (吳產; r. 178 – 157 BCE).

Emperor Wen ended Jia's exile around 172 BCE, summoning him back to the imperial capital at Chang'an, ostensibly as a consultant in Daoist mysticism. The emperor appointed him to the position of Grand Tutor (tàifù 太傅) to Liu Yi, Emperor Wen's youngest and favorite son, who was said to have been a good student and to have enjoyed reading. Liu Yi died in 169 BCE due to injuries he suffered in a fall from a horse. Jia blamed himself for the accident and died, grief-stricken, about one year later.

== Works ==
Jia known for his famous essay The Faults of Qin, in which Jia recounts his opinions on the cause of the Qin dynasty's collapse, and for two of his surviving fu rhapsodies: "On the Owl" and "Lament for Qu Yuan". Since he wrote favorably of social and ethical ideas attributed to Confucius and wrote an essay focused on the failings of the Legalist-based Qin dynasty (221–206 BC), he was classified by other scholars in the Han dynasty as a Confucian scholar (rujia). Jia Yi was known for his interest in ghosts, spirits, and other aspects of the afterlife; and, he wrote his Lament to Qu Yuan as a sacrificial offering to Qu Yuan, who had a century-or-so earlier drowned himself after being politically exiled. Jia Yi's actions inspired future exiled poets to a minor literary genre of similarly writing and then tossing their newly composed verses into the Xiang River, or other waters, as they traversed them on the way to their decreed places of exile.

As a figure favored by Wu Gong, Jia Yi would for a time be classed as a Legalist himself. Although he does bear resemblances, as a figure who wrote the Disquisition Finding Fault with Qin, Jia Yi was probably not a proponent of Shang Yang. He likely was familiar with their writings, as suggested by Sima Qian. But his writings have a core based more in Confucianism and Huang-Lao. Between Shang Yang and Shen Buhai, he was likely much more influenced by Shen Buhai.

== See also ==
- Chao Cuo
- Fu (poetry)
- Jia Yi's Former Residence
- Qu Yuan
- Xiaoxiang poetry
