= Muyun Subdistrict =

Muyun subdistrict 暮云街道
- Subdistrict
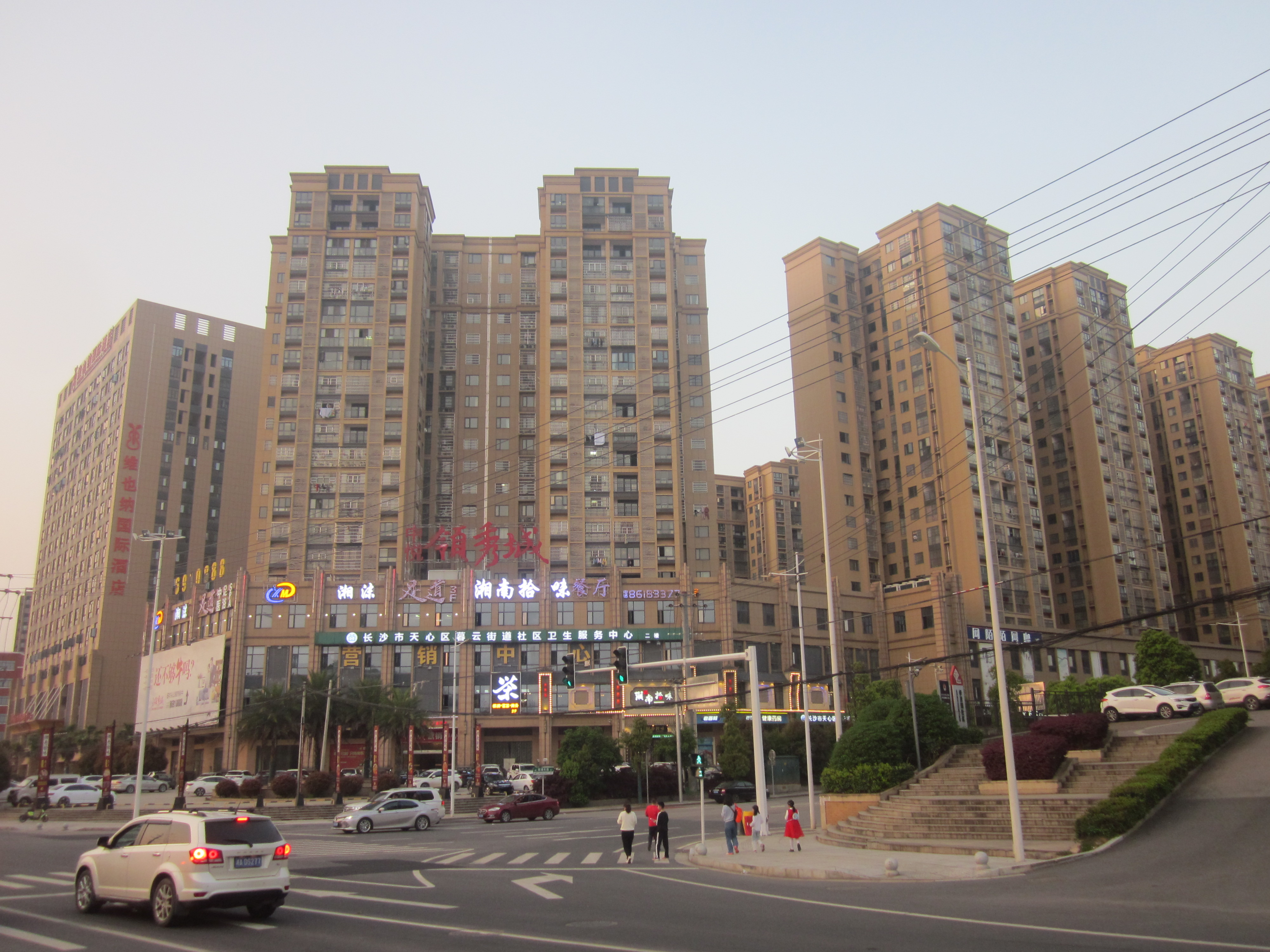
- Residential buildings in Muyun Subdistrict

- Location in Hunan
- Coordinates: 28.0251°N 112.9845°E
- Country: People's Republic of China
- Province: Hunan
- Prefecture-level city: Changsha
- District: Tianxin

Area
  - Total: 96 km^{2} (37 sq mi)

Population (2000)
  - Total: 48,732
  - Density: 510/km^{2} (1,300/sq mi)
- Time zone: UTC+8 (China Standard)

Muyun (simplified Chinese: 暮云街道; traditional Chinese: 暮雲街道; pinyin: Mùyún Jiēdào) is a subdistrict of Tianxin District in Changsha, Hunan province, China. It contains 11 administrative villages and two communities, with the government based in Muyun Community.

Muyun (暮云) subdistricts of Changsha County were added to Tianxin District on 14 January 2015.
