= Guitang =

Guitang Subdistrict 圭塘街道
- Subdistrict
- Interactive map of Guitang Subdistrict
- Coordinates: 28.12840°N 113.04939°E
- Country: People's Republic of China
- Province: Hunan
- Prefecture-level city: Changsha
- District: Yuhua

Area
  - Total: 12.1 km^{2} (4.7 sq mi)

Population (2010 census)
  - Total: 54,729
  - Density: 4,520/km^{2} (11,700/sq mi)
- Time zone: UTC+8 (China Standard)

Guitang (Chinese: 圭塘街道; pinyin: Guītáng Jiēdào) an urban subdistrict and the seat of Yuhua District in Changsha City, Hunan Province, China. Located in the built-up area of the district, the subdistrict has borders with Dongjing Subdistrict to the south, Lituo and Dongshan Subdistricts to the east, Dongtundu Subdistrict of Furong District and Gaoqiao Subdistrict to the north, and Yuhuating and Jingwanzi Subdistricts to the west. It covers 12.1 km^{2} (4.7 sq mi) with a population of 54,729 (as of 2010 census).
