= Tomb of Zuo Zongtang =

Historic site in Hunan, China

- 左宗棠墓
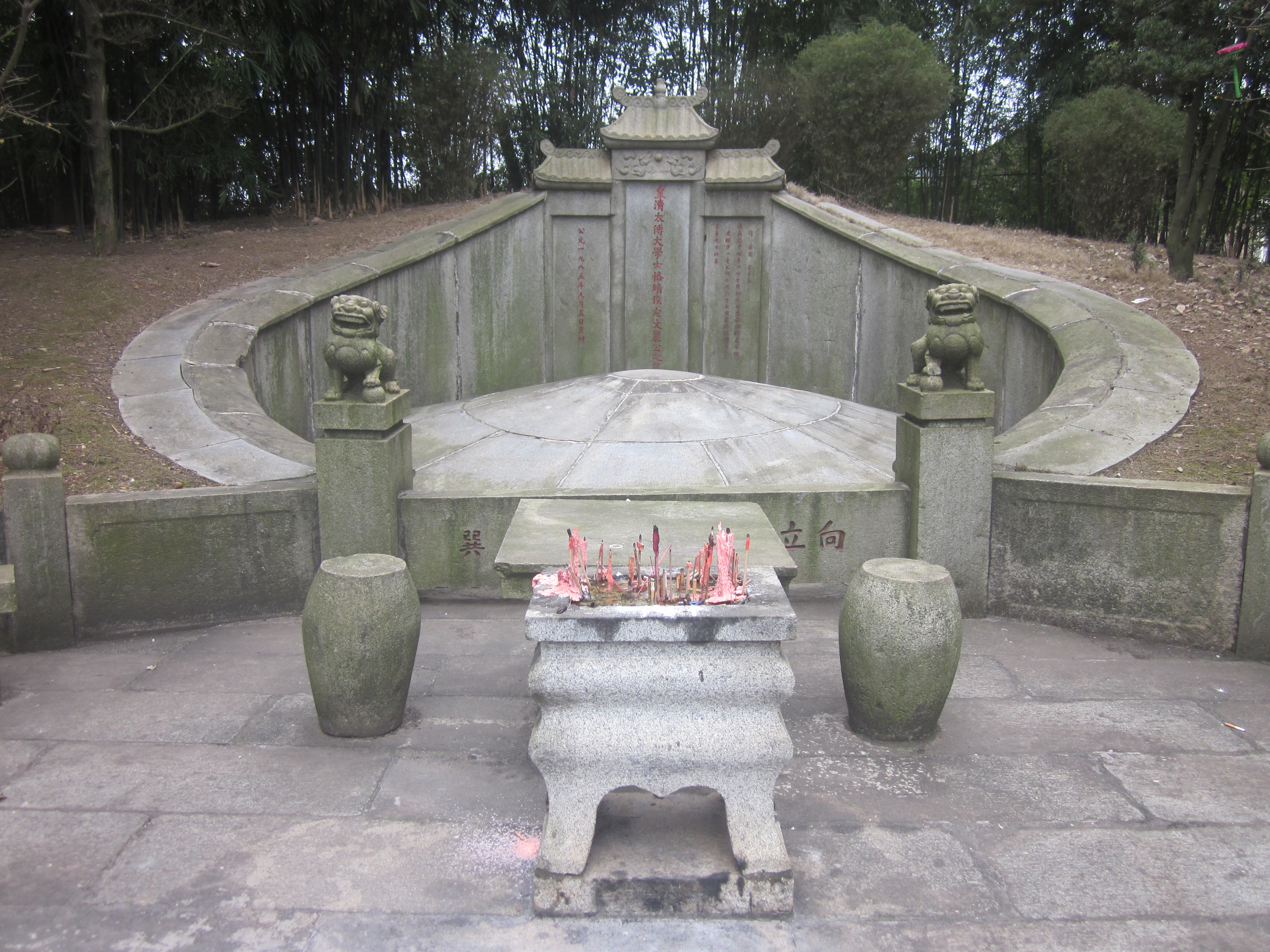
- Tomb of Zuo Zongtang.

- Location within Hunan

General information
- Location: Tiaoma Town, Yuhua District, Changsha, Hunan, China
- Coordinates: 28°05′53″N 113°05′56″E
- Completed: 1886

Technical details
- Material: Granite

The Tomb of Zuo Zongtang (Chinese: 左宗棠墓; pinyin: Zuǒ Zōngtáng Mù) is the tomb of Zuo Zongtang, a Chinese statesman and military leader of the late Qing dynasty (1644–1911). The tomb dates from 1886, and is located in Tiaoma Town of Yuhua District, Changsha, Hunan, China. It has been categorized as a provincial level key cultural heritage in 1996 by the Hunan Provincial Government.

== History ==
The tomb was built for Zuo Zongtang, who was a statesman and military leader of the late Qing dynasty (1644–1911). The tomb is located in Tiaoma Town of Yuhua District, Changsha, Hunan. When Zuo Zongtang died in 1885 in Fuzhou, Fujian, he was buried in here in the following year.

During the Cultural Revolution, the Red Guards blasted open an entrance way and entered the tomb, Zuo Zongtang's body was dumped in the wild.

In 1986, during the 100th anniversary of Zuo Zongtang's death, Hunan Provincial Government rebuilt the tomb.

== Gallery ==
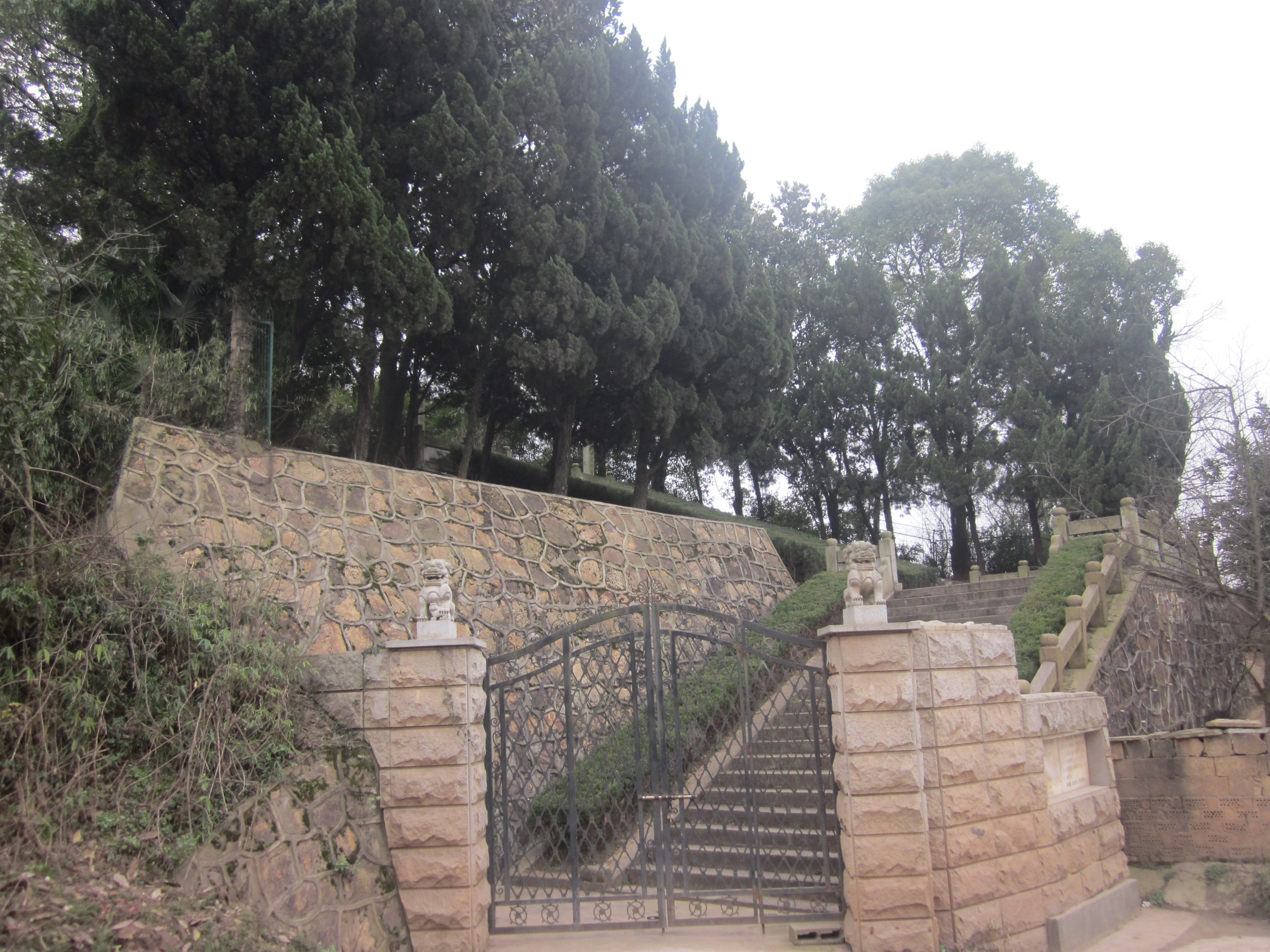
Entrance of the Tomb of Zuo Zongtang.

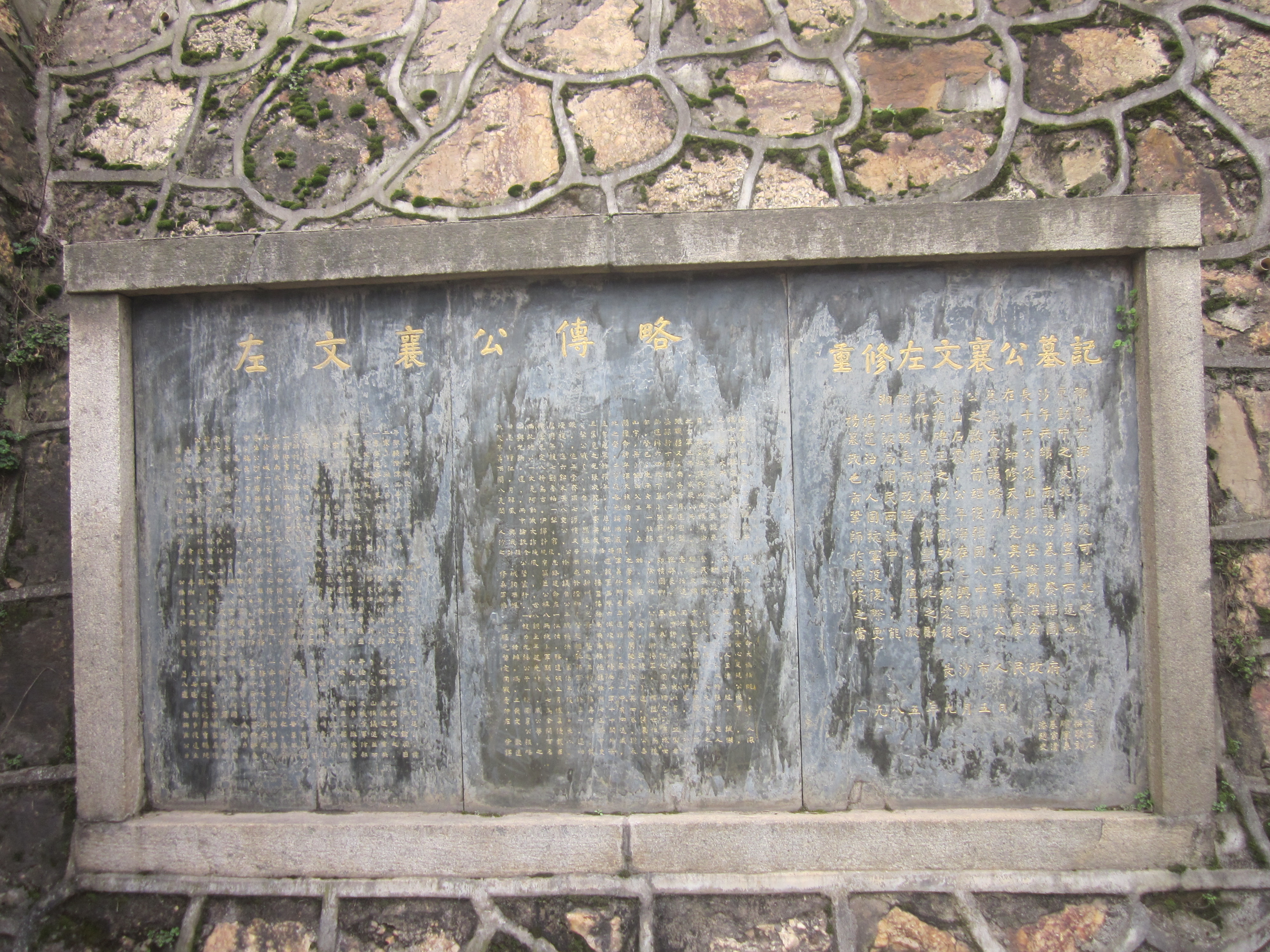
Stele

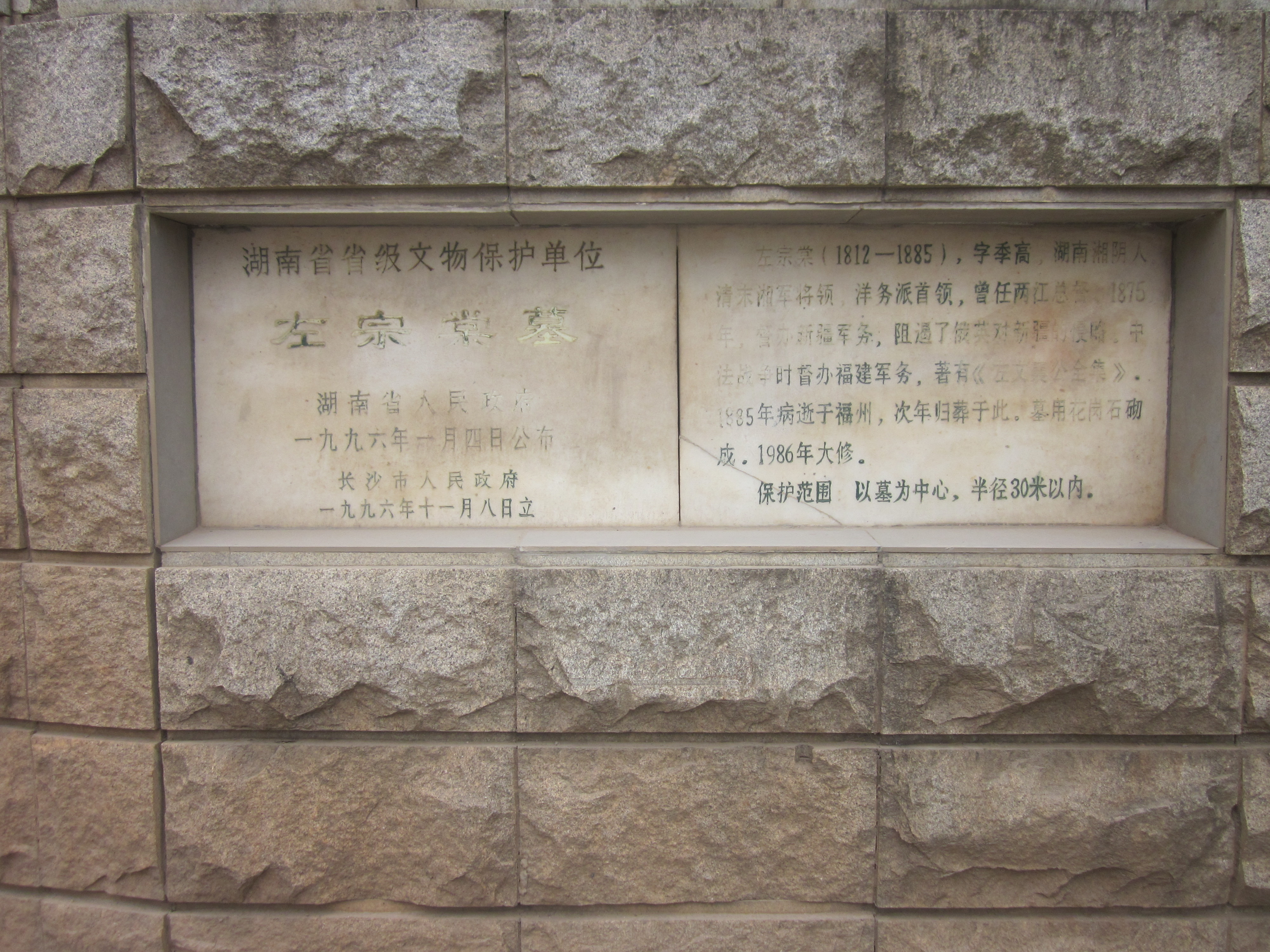

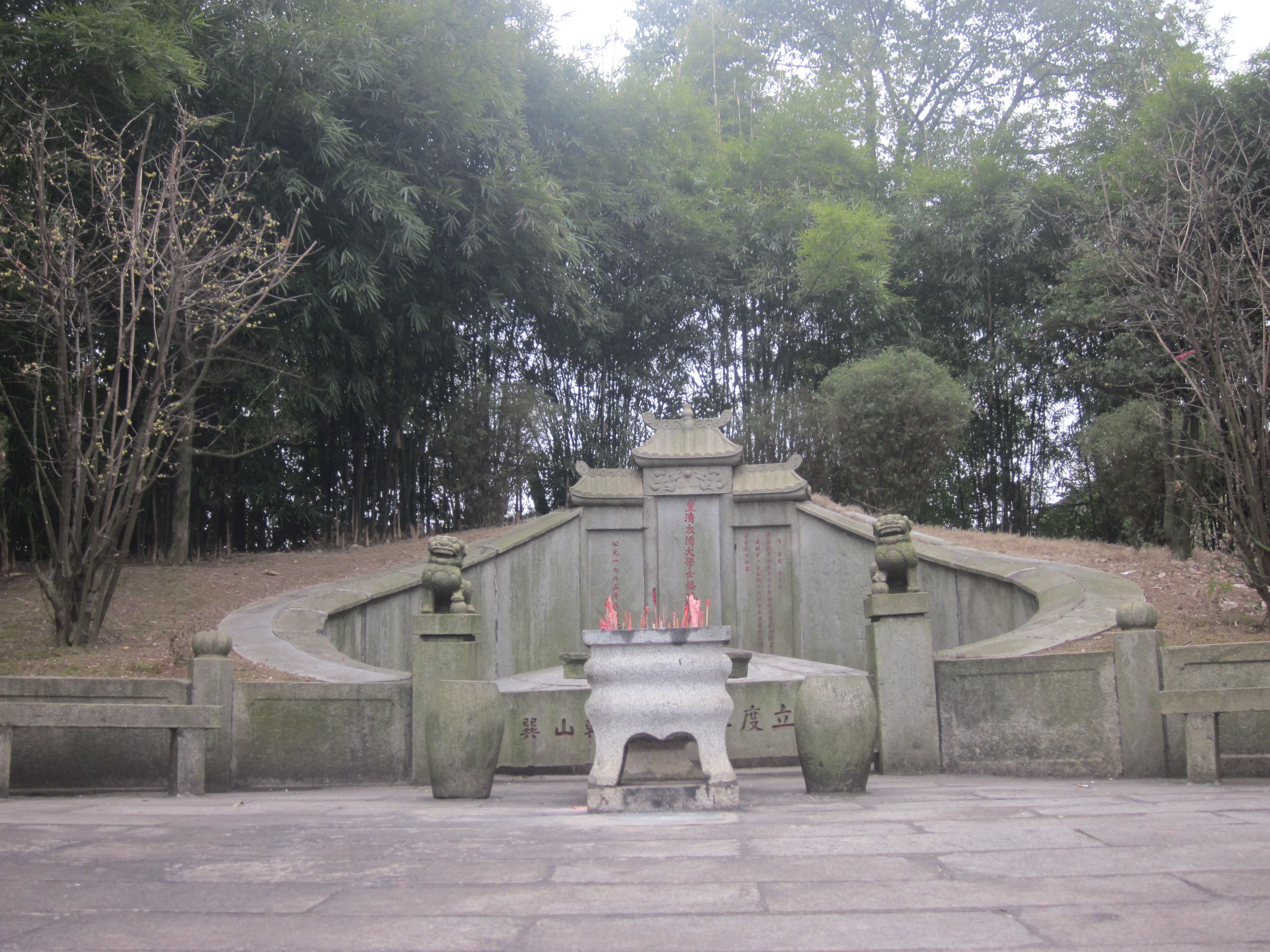
Tomb

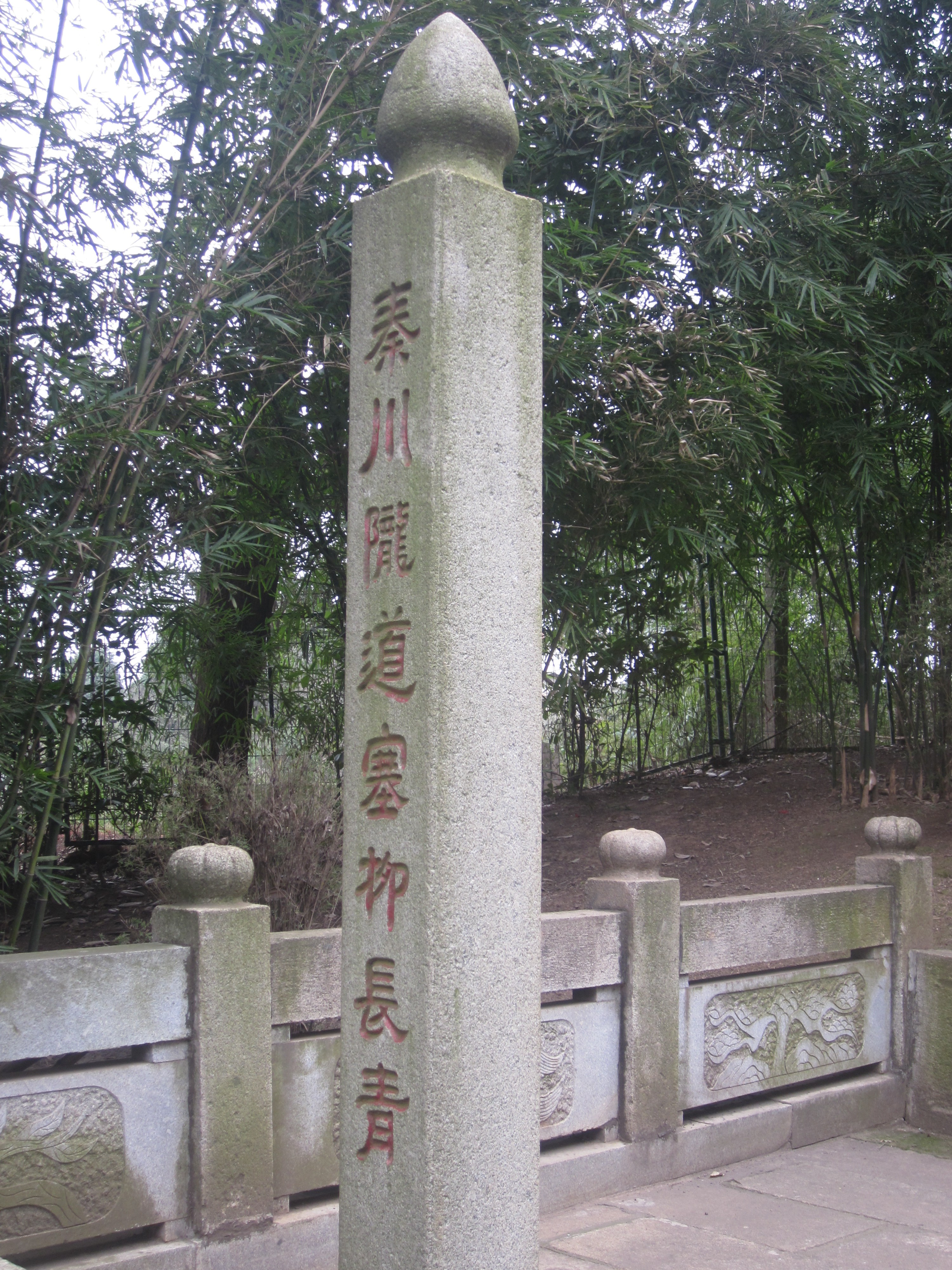
Pillar (left) in front of the Tomb of Zuo Zongtang.

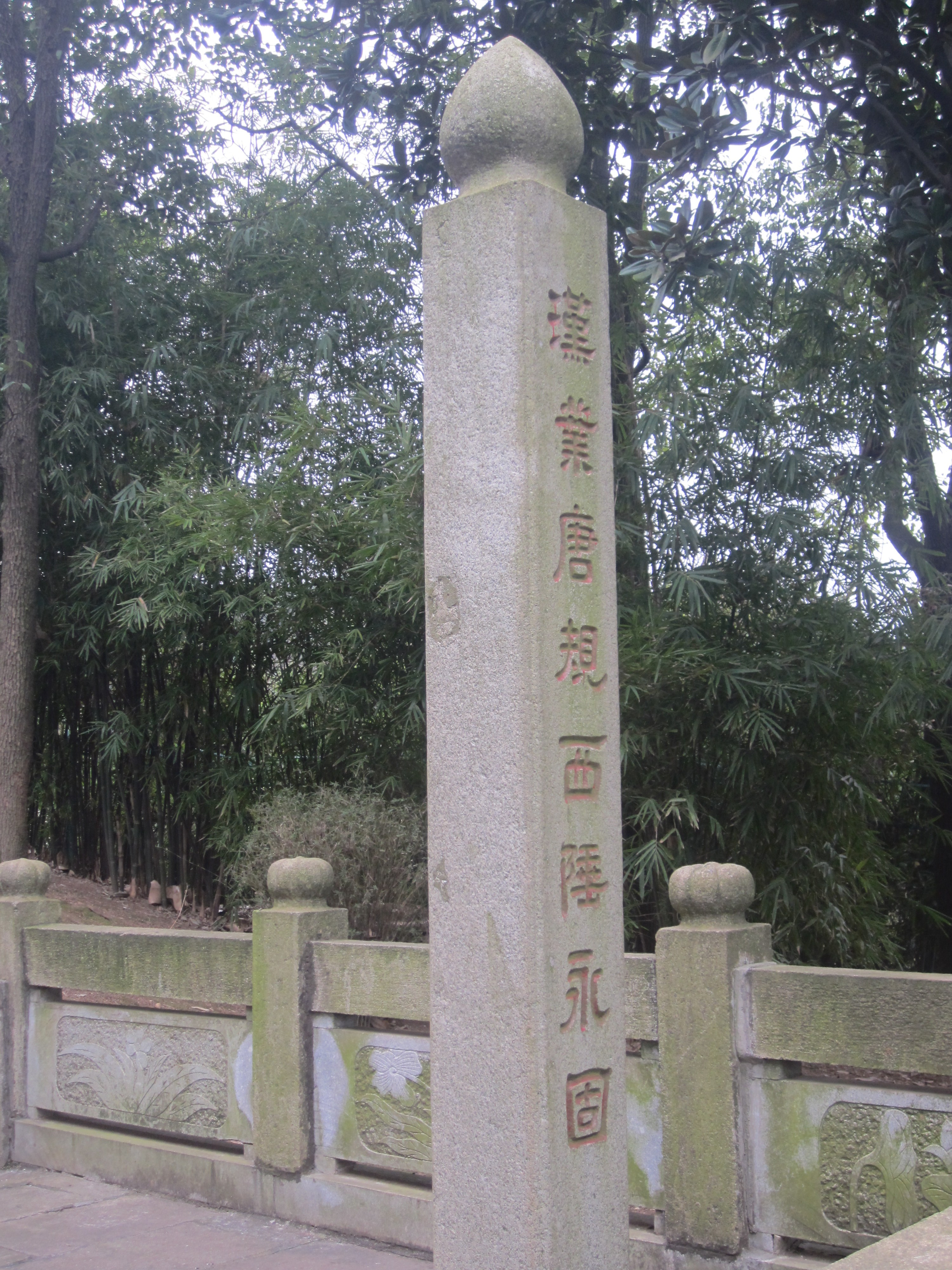
Pillar (right) in front of the Tomb of Zuo Zongtang.
