= Shazitang Primary School =

- 砂子塘小学
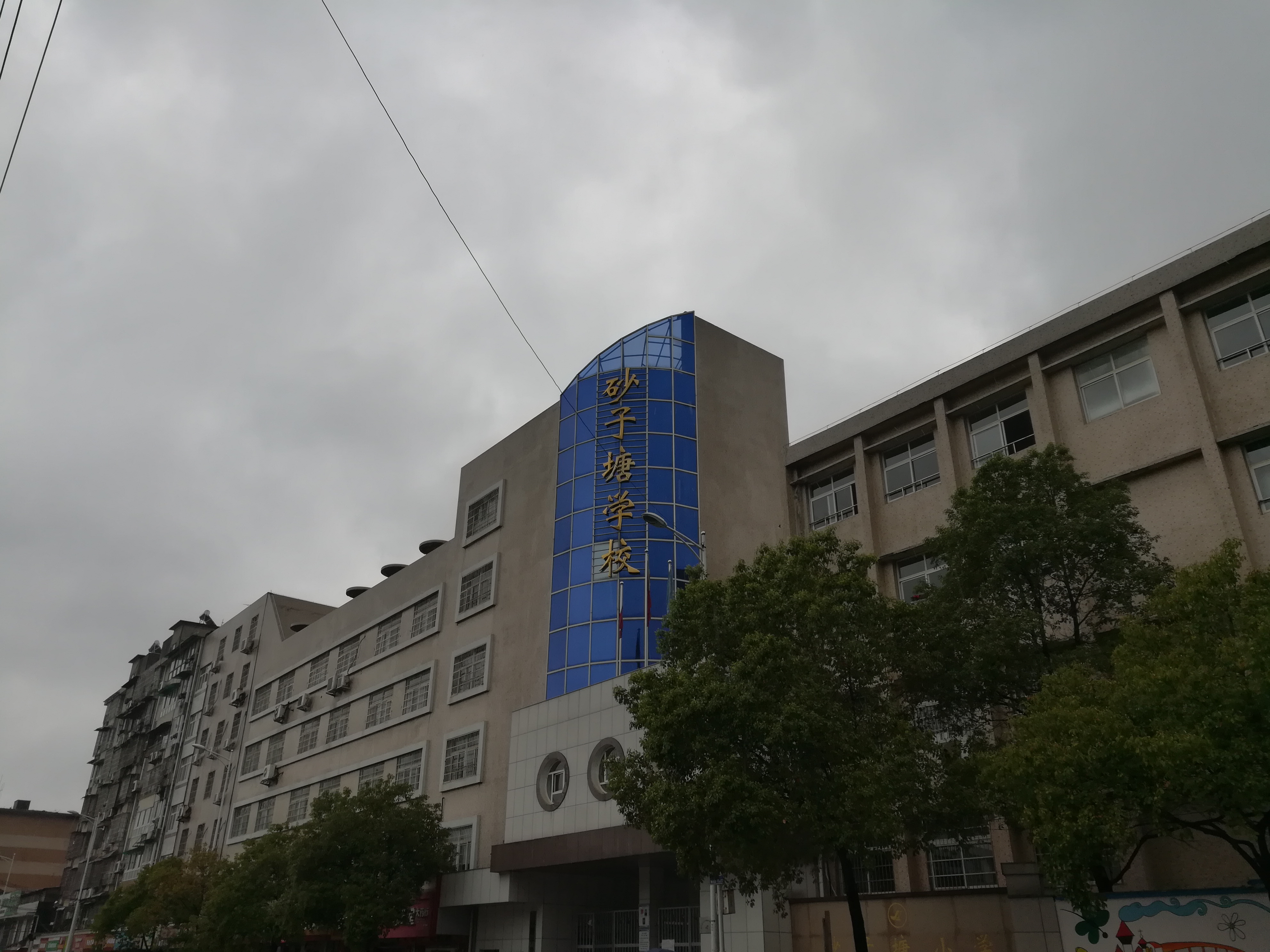

Location
- No. 16 Shazitang Road; Yuhua District; Changsha, Hunan; China

Information
- Type: Public
- Established: 1963
- Grades: 1-6

Shazitang Primary School (simplified Chinese: 砂子塘小学; traditional Chinese: 砂子塘小學; pinyin: Shāzǐtáng Xiǎoxué), or Shaxiao (砂小) for short, was founded in 1963. The school's main campus is located at No. 16 Shazitang Road, Yuhua District, Changsha, Hunan, China. It is a large-scale, comprehensive, public primary school with 100 classes.

== History ==
Shazitang Primary School was founded in 1963 in Changsha. The school has three locations and currently has 107 classes, more than 5,400 students, more than 310 faculty and staff. It is a "key primary school" (Chinese: 示范小学).

In November 2000, it reached a joint school-running agreement with Tianhua Village, Dongjing Town, to jointly build Changsha Shazitang Tianhua Boarding Experimental School, which is the first branch of Shazitang Education Group. In 2022, it was renamed Shazitang Tianhua Primary School.

On June 27, 2002, with the approval of the Yuhua District People's Government, the "China Changsha Shazitang Education Group" was established by Shazitang Primary School, Shazitang Tianhua Boarding Experimental School, and Shazitang Little White Pigeon Kindergarten.

By 2013, the school had expanded to eight campuses.

== Internationalization ==
In October 1983, with the help of the Foreign Affairs Office of Changsha Municipal People's Government, Meiwa Primary School in Kagoshima City, Japan and Shazitang Primary School became sister city schools, marking the beginning of educational and cultural exchanges between the two schools.
