= Mawangdui (disambiguation) =

Mawangdui is an archaeological site located in Changsha, China.

Mawangdui may also refer to:

- Mawangdui Subdistrict, a subdistrict in Changsha, China.
- Mawangdui Silk Texts, Chinese philosophical and medical works written on silk
