= Zuo Zongtang =

Chinese statesman and army officer (1812–1885)

Second Class Marquis Kejing Zuo Zongtang
- 左宗棠
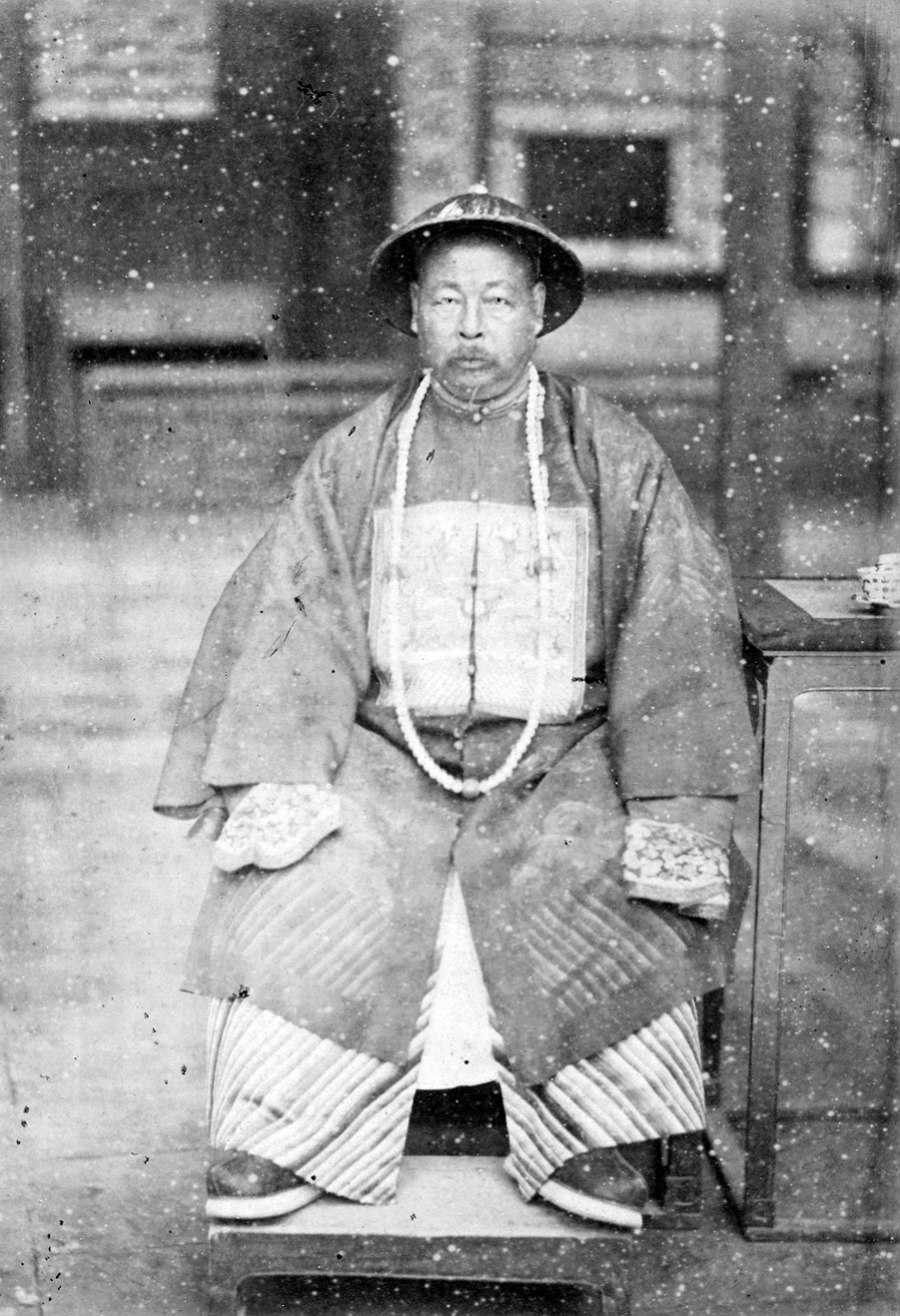
- Photograph of Zuo Zongtang, late 19th century

Grand Councilor
- In office 15 June 1884 – 19 September 1884
- In office 19 February 1881 – 28 October 1881

Grand Secretary of the Eastern Library
- In office 18 December 1874 – 5 September 1885

Assistant Grand Secretary
- In office 14 August 1873 – 18 December 1874

Viceroy of Liangjiang
- In office 28 October 1881 – 8 February 1884
- Preceded by: Peng Yulin
- Succeeded by: Yulu (acting)

Viceroy of Shaan-Gan
- In office 25 September 1866 – 11 August 1880
- Preceded by: Enlin (1864); Mutushan (1866–1869)
- Succeeded by: Yang Changjun

Viceroy of Min-Zhe
- In office 21 May 1863 – 25 September 1866
- Preceded by: Qiling
- Succeeded by: Wu Tang

Provincial Governor of Zhejiang
- In office 30 December 1861 – 21 May 1863
- Preceded by: Wang Youling
- Succeeded by: Zeng Guoquan

Personal details
- Born: 10 November 1812 Xiangyin County, Yueyang City, Hunan Province, Qing Empire
- Died: 5 September 1885 (aged 72) Fuzhou City, Fujian Province, Qing Empire
- Resting place: Tomb of Zuo Zongtang
- Spouse: Zhou Yiduan (m. 1832)
- Children: Sons: Zuo Xiaowei (1846–1873); Zuo Xiaokuan (b. 1847); Zuo Xiaoxun (b. 1853); Zuo Xiaotong (1857–1924); Daughters: Zuo Xiaoyu (b. 1833); Zuo Xiaoqi (1834–1873); Zuo Xiaolin (b. 1837); Zuo Xiaobin (b. 1837)
- Education: Jinshi degree in the Imperial Examination
- Occupation: Statesman, military leader

Military service
- Allegiance: Qing Empire
- Years of service: 1851–1885
- Rank: General
- Unit: Xiang Army
- Commands: Commander of the Xiang Army
- Battles/wars: Taiping Rebellion, Nian Rebellion, Dungan Revolt, Qing reconquest of Xinjiang

Zuo Zongtang
- Chinese: 左宗棠
Transcriptions
Standard Mandarin
- Hanyu Pinyin: Zuǒ Zōngtáng
- Wade–Giles: Tso^{3} Tsung^{1}-t'ang^{2}
- IPA: [tswò tsʊ́ŋ.tʰǎŋ]
Xiang
- IPA: [tso˧˩ tsoŋ˧ tan˩˧ tɕi˧];

Zuo Zongtang (左宗棠, Xiang Chinese: [tso˧˩ tsoŋ˧ tan˩˧]; Wade-Giles spelling: Tso Tsung-t'ang; 10 November 1812 – 5 September 1885), sometimes referred to as General Tso, was a Chinese statesman and army officer of the late Qing dynasty.

Born in Xiangyin County, Hunan Province, Zuo started his career in the Qing military by participating in the campaign against the Taiping Rebellion in 1851. After capturing Hangzhou from the Taiping rebels in 1864, he was enfeoffed as a first class count. In 1866, Zuo oversaw the construction of the Foochow Arsenal and naval academy. That same year, he was reassigned to serve as the Viceroy of Shaan-Gan, where he oversaw industrialization in Gansu Province. In 1867, he was appointed as an Imperial Commissioner in charge of military affairs in Gansu.

During his term as Imperial Commissioner in Gansu, Zuo participated in the suppression of the Nian Rebellion and Dungan Revolt. By the late 1870s, he had crushed the Dungan rebels and recaptured Xinjiang Province from rebel forces. In 1878, because of his achievements, Zuo was promoted from a first class count to a second class marquis. He was appointed to the Grand Council in 1884, before being made an Imperial Commissioner again to oversee naval affairs. He died in 1885 in Fuzhou, Fujian Province, and was given the posthumous name Wenxiang.

Zuo is mostly acknowledged outside China for his military exploits, but he also contributed to Chinese agricultural science and education. In particular, he promoted cotton cultivation to northwestern China as a replacement for the cash crop opium and established a large modern press in Shaanxi and Gansu provinces, which published Confucian classics and newer works on agricultural science.

== Names ==
Zuo Zongtang's family name was Zuo and his given name was Zongtang. His courtesy name was Jigao (季高; Jìgāo) or Cun (存; Cún). His art name (or pseudonym) was Xiangshang Nongren (湘上農人; 湘上农人; Xiāngshàng Nóngrén), which means "peasant from Xiang". He often signed off by the name Jinliang (今亮; Jīnliàng), which means "(Zhuge) Liang of today", since he liked to compare himself with Zhuge Liang.

The titles of nobility he held were First Class Count Kejing (一等恪靖伯; Yīděng Kèjìng Bó) from 1864 to 1878, and Second Class Marquis Kejing (二等恪靖侯; Èrděng Kèjìng Hóu) from 1878 to his death in 1885. Zuo's posthumous name, granted by the Qing imperial court, was Wenxiang (文襄; Wénxiāng).

Zuo was nicknamed "Zuo Luozi" (左騾子; Zuǒ Luózǐ) ("Zuo the mule") for his stubbornness.

== Biography ==
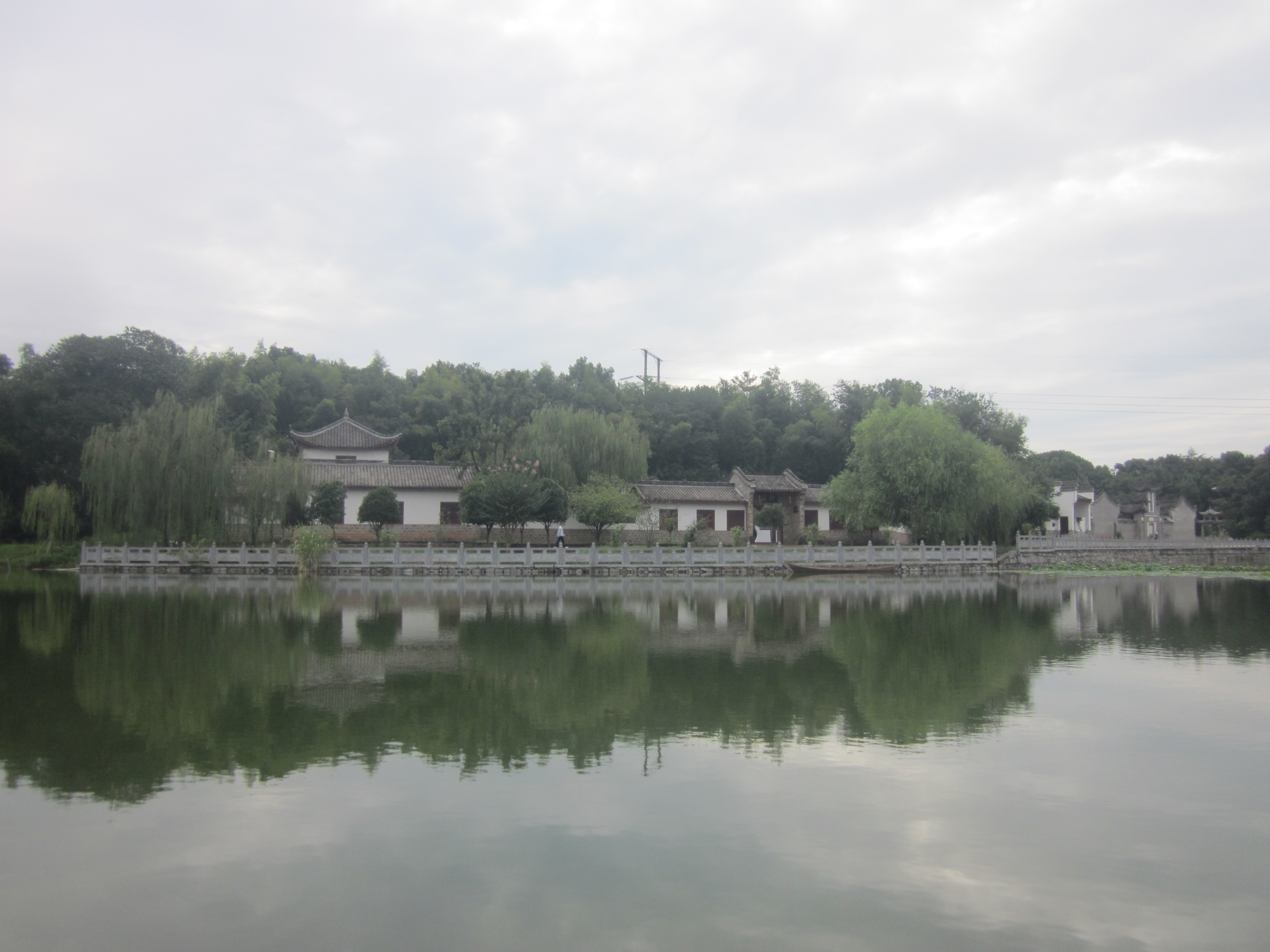
Former Residence of Zuo Zongtang in Xiangyin County, Hunan.

=== Early life ===
Zuo was born in 1812 in a land-holding family in Xiangyin County, Hunan Province. His family paid for him to attend a local private school starting from the age of five, where he mastered the Confucian classics. At the age of 20, he qualified to attend the Imperial Academy.

Zuo's career got an inauspicious start when, in his youth, he failed the imperial examination seven times (c. 1822–1835). He decided to abandon his plans to become an official and returned to his home by the Xiang River to farm silkworms, read, and drink tea. It was during this period that he first directed his attention to the study of Western sciences, in the early days of the eastward spread of Western learning.

=== Taiping Rebellion ===
When the Taiping Rebellion broke out in 1850, Zuo, then 38 years old, was hired as an advisor to Zeng Guofan, the governor of Hunan. In 1856, he was formally offered a position in the provincial government of Hunan. In 1860, Zuo was given command of a force of 5,000 volunteers, the Xiang Army (later known as "Chu Army"), and by September of that year, he drove the Taiping rebels out of Hunan and Guangxi provinces, into coastal Zhejiang Province. Zuo captured the city of Shaoxing and, from there, pushed south into Fujian and Guangdong provinces, where the revolt had first begun. In 1863, Zuo was appointed Provincial Governor of Zhejiang and an Undersecretary of War.

In August 1864, Zuo, together with Zeng Guofan, dethroned the Taiping Heavenly Kingdom's teenage ruler, Hong Tianguifu, and brought an end to the rebellion. He was created "First Class Count Kejing" for his part in suppressing the rebellion. He, Zeng Guofan and Li Hongzhang were called Zeng, Zuo, Li, the leaders in suppressing the rebellion.

In 1865, Zuo was appointed Viceroy and Governor-General of Fujian and Zhejiang. As Commissioner of Naval Industries, Zuo founded China's first modern shipyard and naval academy in Fuzhou the following year.

=== Success and appointments ===
Zuo Zongtang in 1875
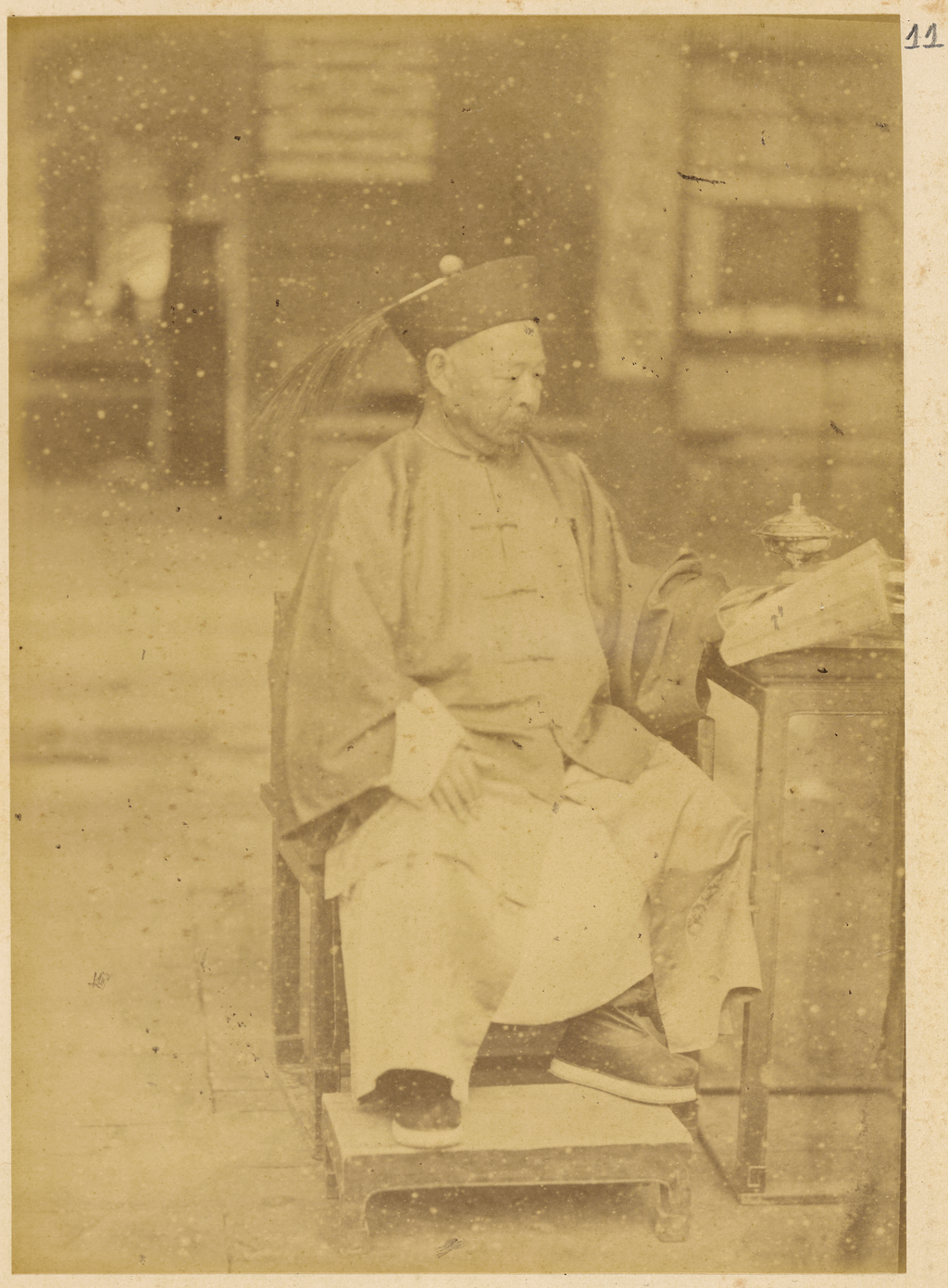
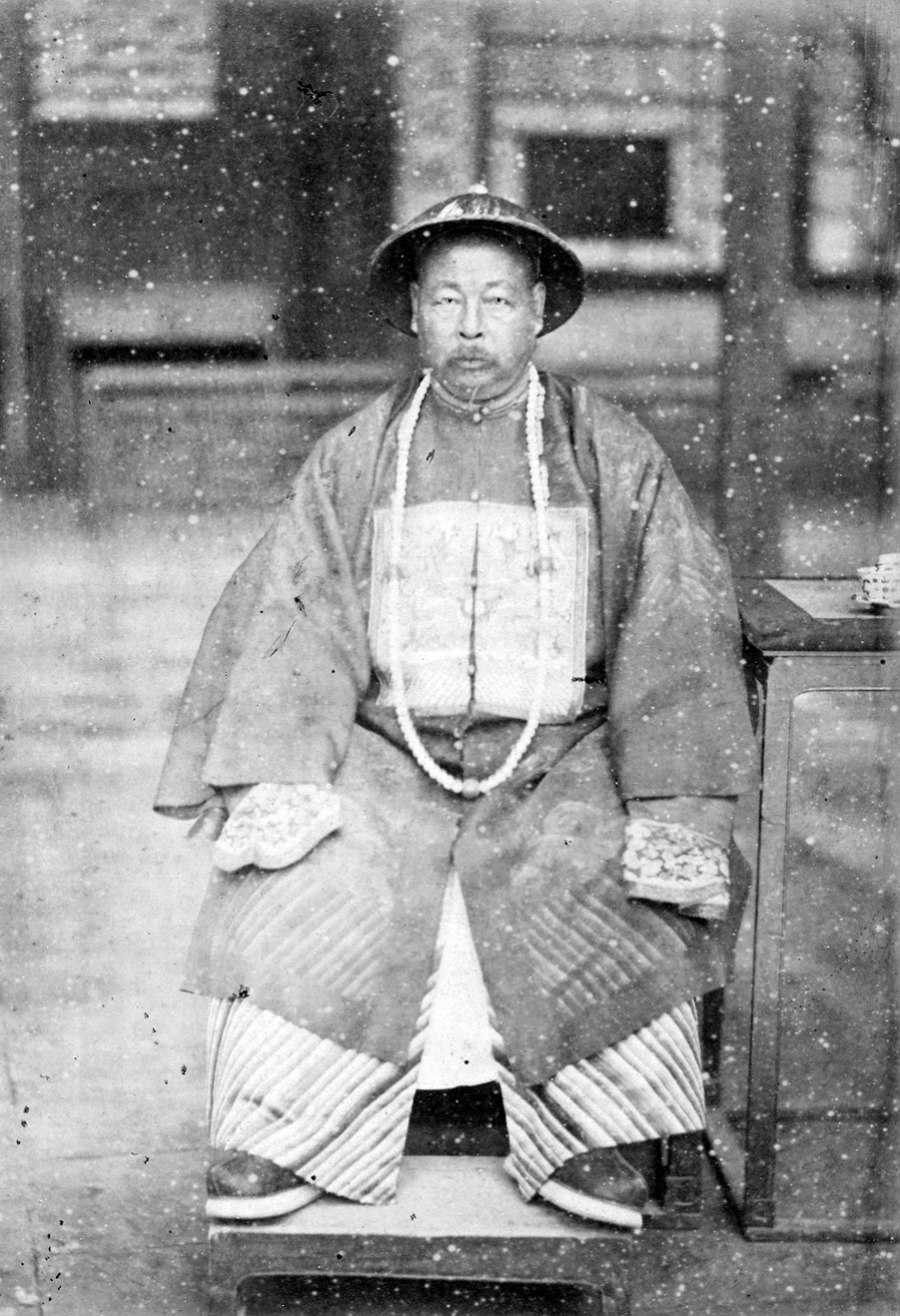
As Viceroy of Shaanxi and Gansu provinces, Zuo posed for a Russian photographer. On the left, wearing civilian dress with a peacock feather in his hat, and on the right, wearing court dress with long court beads.

Zuo's successes continued. In 1867, he became Viceroy of Shaanxi and Gansu provinces and Imperial Commissioner of the armed forces in Shaanxi. In 1884, his fellow Xiang Army officer, Liu Jintang, was appointed as the first governor of Xinjiang Province. The Governor of Xinjiang was the subordinate to the Viceroy of Shaanxi and Gansu.

In these capacities, Zuo succeeded in putting down another uprising, the Nian Rebellion, in 1868.

After this military success, Zuo marched west with his army of 120,000, winning many victories with advanced Western weapons in the Dungan Revolt in northwestern China (Shaanxi, Ningxia, Gansu, Qinghai and Xinjiang provinces) in the 1870s.

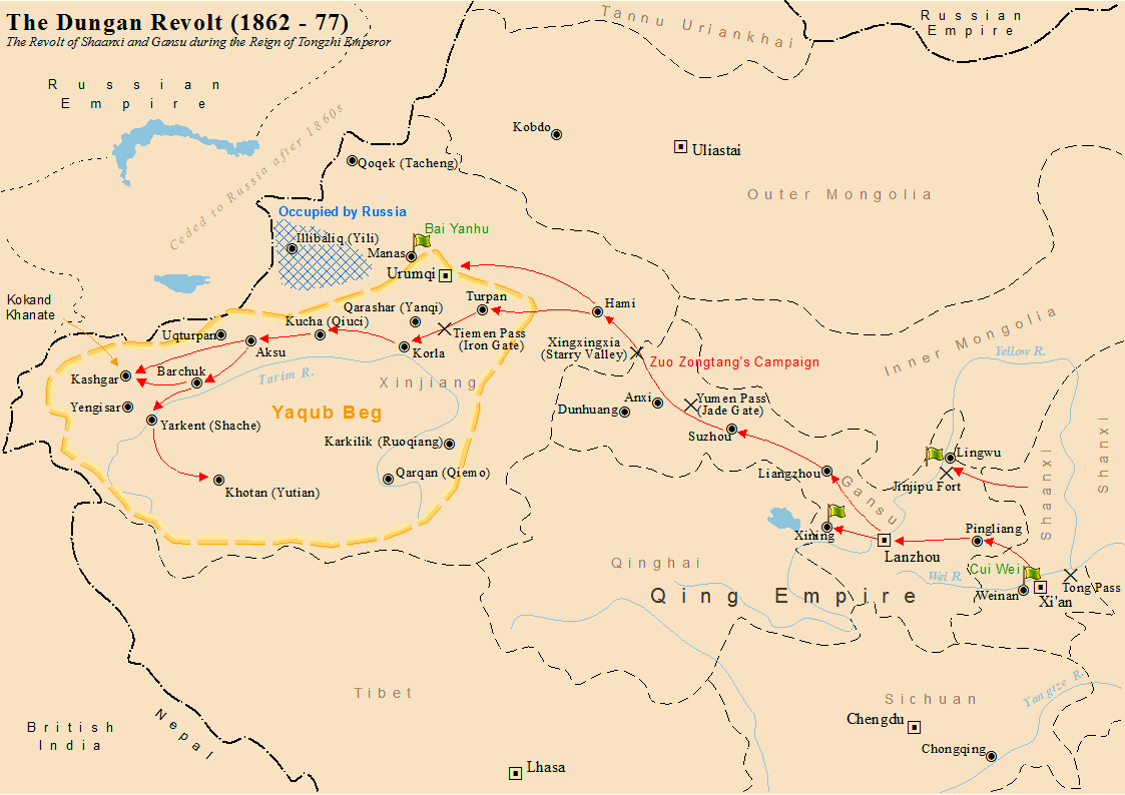
The map showing Zuo's campaign against Dungan rebels and Yaqub Beg in Xinjiang

Several Hui Muslim generals, such as Ma Zhan'ao, Ma Anliang, Ma Qianling, Dong Fuxiang, and Ma Haiyan from Hezhou, who had defected to Zuo's army, helped him crush the "Muslim rebels". Zuo rewarded them by relocating the Han Chinese from the suburbs of Hezhou to another place and allowing their troops to stay in the Hezhou suburbs as long as they did not live in the city itself.

In 1878, Zuo successfully suppressed Yakub Beg's uprising and helped to negotiate an end to Russian occupation of the border city of Ili. He was vocal in the debate at the Qing imperial court over what to do with the Xinjiang situation, advocating for Xinjiang to become a province, in opposition to Li Hongzhang, who wanted to abandon what he called "useless Xinjiang" and concentrate on defending China's coastal areas. However, Zuo won the debate, Xinjiang was made a province, and many administrative functions were staffed by his Hunan officers.

Zuo was outspoken in calling for war against the Russian Empire, hoping to settle the matter by attacking Russian forces in Xinjiang with his Xiang Army. In 1878, when tension increased in Xinjiang, Zuo massed Qing forces toward the Russian-occupied Kuldja. The Canadian Spectator stated in 1878, "News from Turkestan says the Chinese are concentrating against Kuldja, a post in Kashgar occupied by the Russians... It is reported that a Russian expedition from Yart Vernaic has been fired upon by Chinese troops and forced to return." The Russians were afraid of the Qing forces, thousands of whom were armed with modern weapons and trained by European officers. Because the Russian forces near the Qing Empire's border were under-manned and under-equipped, they agreed to negotiate.

Zuo's troops were armed with modern German Dreyse needle rifles and Krupp artillery as well as experimental weapons.

For his contributions to his nation and monarch, Zuo was appointed a Grand Secretary to the Grand Secretariat in 1874 and elevated to "Second Class Marquis Kejing" in 1878.

=== Later life and death ===
Zuo was appointed to the Grand Council, the cabinet of the Qing Empire, in 1880. Uneasy with bureaucratic politics, Zuo asked to be relieved of his duties and was appointed Viceroy of Liangjiang in 1881. In 1884, upon the outbreak of the Sino-French War, Zuo received his fourth and last commission as commander-in-chief and Imperial Commissioner of the military and Inspector-General overseeing coastal defences in Fujian Province. He died in 1885 in Fuzhou, Fujian Province, and was given the posthumous name Wenxiang.

== Legacy ==
Zuo was admired by many generals who came after him. During the Republican era, the Kuomintang general Bai Chongxi wanted to reconquer Xinjiang for the Nationalist government, in Zuo's style, and expelled Russian influence from the area. Zuo was also referred to by Kuomintang general Ma Zhongying (a descendant of a Salar noble) as one of his models, as Ma led the National Revolutionary Army's 36th Division to reconquer Xinjiang for the Nationalist government from the pro-Soviet governor Jin Shuren during the Kumul Rebellion.

While Zuo is best known for his military acumen, he believed that the key to peace and stability lay in an educated, prosperous citizenry. He sometimes referred to himself by his art name, "peasant from Xiang", and was keenly interested in agriculture. He advocated the scientific reform of commercial agriculture both as a way to strengthen China's economic self-sufficiency and also as a way to manage civilian populations by improving their standard of living and controlling the kinds of crops they grew. During the 12 years he spent in northwestern China, he undertook extensive agricultural research on different crops and methods. Comparing the benefits and indications of two ancient agricultural methods, the more established long field, crop rotation method (代田法) and the less common intensive, small-field method (區田法), Zuo believed that the latter method, cultivating small fields of densely-planted monocultures, was more suitable to the dry, extreme climate of the northwest region. To promote this method, he authored two pamphlets explaining the method which were then distributed freely to local farming communities. Zuo also recognised the threat of opium to the nation's stability and economic health and advocated replacing opium poppies with cotton as the major cash crop in Gansu and Shaanxi provinces. He authorised the large scale distribution of cotton seeds and published pamphlets on its cultivation and processing. In 1878, he also oversaw the establishment of a large weaving factory in present-day Mulan County, Gansu Province, with the aim of creating a new textile industry in the region and providing socially-acceptable employment to women.

In addition to managing the peasantry by improving their economic circumstances, Zuo also believed that increasing access to traditional Chinese philosophy would help to pacify areas experiencing unrest and ultimately create a more contented and unified populace. To this end, Zuo set up a printing press in northwestern China which printed Chinese classics, as well as agricultural pamphlets. When Zuo first arrived in the region, a decade of constant warfare had virtually stopped all publishing in the region. Zuo prioritised reestablishing the printing industry a priority and thousands of copies of the publications he authorised were distributed in Ningxia, Qinghai, Gansu, Shaanxi and Xinjiang. Printing appears to have stopped when Zuo returned to Beijing, but the endeavour is credited with inspiring later printing presses.

== Family ==
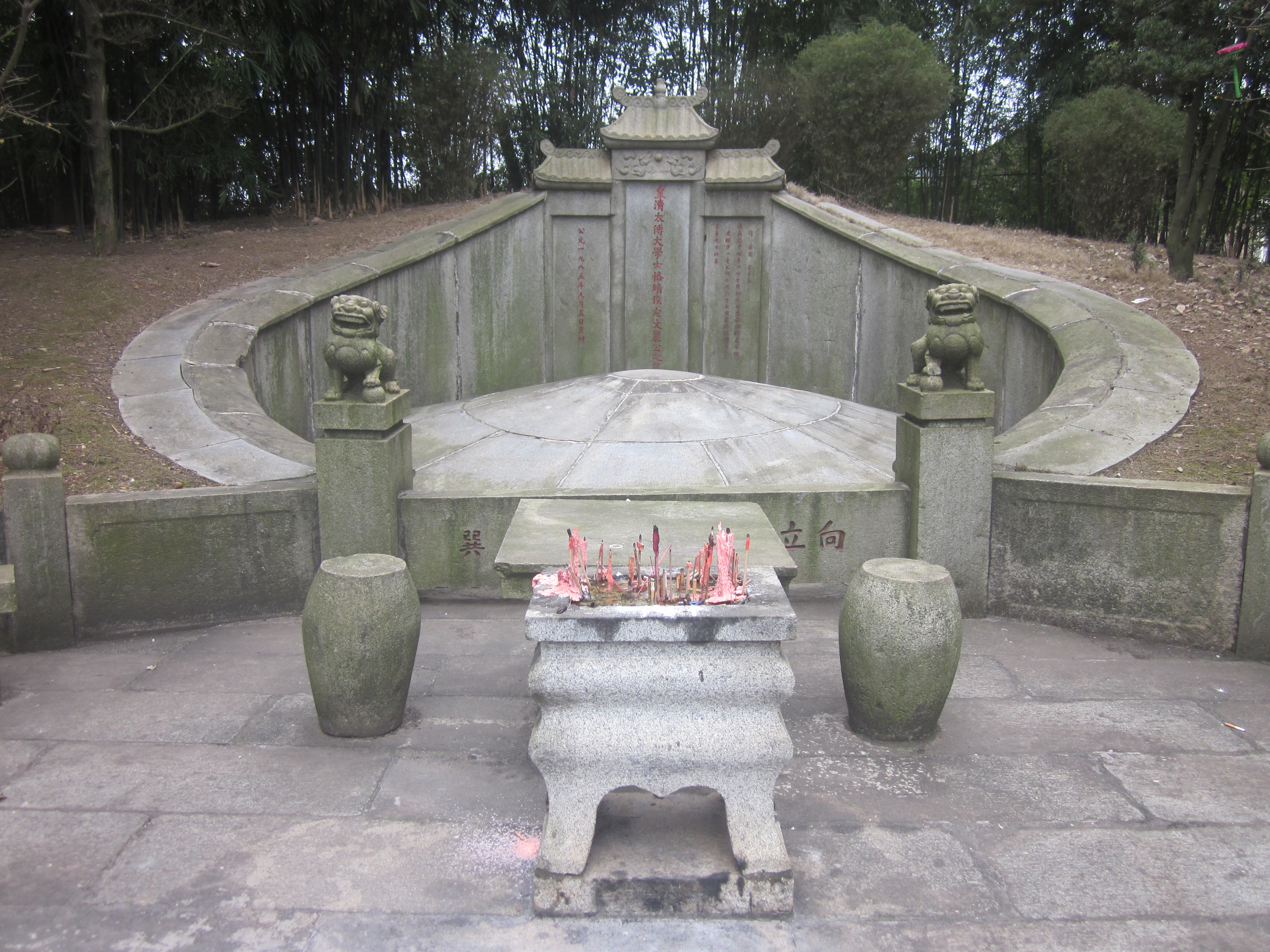
Tomb of Zuo Zongtang in Yuhua District, Changsha, Hunan.

Zuo's great-grandparents were Zuo Fengsheng (左逢聖) and Madam Jiang (蔣氏). His grandparents were Zuo Renjin (左人錦) and Madam Yang (楊氏). His parents were Zuo Guanlan (左觀瀾; 1778–1830) and Madam Yu (余氏; 1775–1827).

Zuo had two elder brothers: Zuo Zongyu (左宗棫; 1799–1823) and Zuo Zongzhi (左宗植; 1804–1872).

In 1832, Zuo married Zhou Yiduan (周詒端; 1812–1870), a woman from Paitou Township, Xiangtan County in Hunan Province. Zhou's courtesy name was "Junxin" (筠心). They had four daughters and four sons as follows:

- Zuo Xiaoyu (左孝瑜; born 1833), courtesy name Shenjuan (慎娟), Zuo's first daughter. She married Tao Zhu's son, Tao Guang (陶桄). She wrote Shi Shiwu Shicao (小石屋詩草).
- Zuo Xiaoqi (左孝琪; 1834–1873), courtesy name Jingzhai (靜齋), Zuo's second daughter. She wrote Yilan Shi Shicao (猗蘭室詩草).
- Zuo Xiaolin (左孝琳; born 1837), courtesy name Xiangju (湘娵), Zuo's third daughter. She married Li Fuchang (黎福昌) from Xiangtan County. She wrote Qionghua Ge Shicao (瓊華閣詩草).
- Zuo Xiaobin (左孝璸; born 1837), courtesy name Shaohua (少華), Zuo's fourth daughter. She married Zhou Yibiao (周翼標) from Xiangtan County. She wrote Dan Ru Zhai Yishi (淡如齋遺詩).
- Zuo Xiaowei (左孝威; 1846–1873), courtesy name Zizhong (子重), Zuo's first son.
- Zuo Xiaokuan (左孝寬; born 1847), Zuo's second son.
- Zuo Xiaoxun (左孝勳; born 1853), Zuo's third son.
- Zuo Xiaotong (左孝同; 1857–1924), courtesy name Ziyi (子異), Zuo's fourth son.

== General Tso's chicken ==
The dish General Tso's chicken in American Chinese cuisine was introduced in Taiwan and then in North America in the 1970s, inspired by a dish originally prepared in the 1950s by Peng Chang-kuei, a Taiwanese chef specialising in Hunan cuisine. Peng named the dish in honour of Zuo Zongtang.

One apocryphal story, for which no evidence is offered, credits the Chinese and Southeast Asian stuffed pancake Apam balik to the general. He is said to have invented it as a way to use local products and save his men from more expensive ingredients.

== Cultural references ==
- The Filipino novel Revolution: 80 Days (2022) features Zuo as a general campaigning against the Muslims in the empire's New Frontier.

== See also ==
- Tomb of Zuo Zongtang
- Taiping Rebellion
- Dungan Revolt (1862–77)
- Xinjiang under Qing rule
- Qing reconquest of Xinjiang
- Self-Strengthening Movement

Government offices
Preceded by Qiling	Viceroy of Min-Zhe; 1863–1866	Succeeded by Wu Tang
Preceded by Enlin (1864); Mutushan (1866–1869)	Viceroy of Shaan-Gan; 1866–1880	Succeeded by Yang Changjun
Preceded by Peng Yulin	Viceroy of Liangjiang; 1881–1884	Succeeded by Yulu
