= Yuhuating =

Yuhuating subdistrict 雨花亭街道
- Subdistrict
- Interactive map of Yuhuating subdistrict
- Coordinates: 28.140402440504808°N 113.00082722453695°E
- Country: People's Republic of China
- Province: Hunan
- Prefecture-level city: Changsha
- District: Yuhua

Area
  - Total: 8 km^{2} (3.1 sq mi)

Population (2012)
  - Total: 58,000
  - Density: 7,200/km^{2} (19,000/sq mi)
- Time zone: UTC+8 (China Standard)

Yuhuating (Chinese: 雨花亭街道; pinyin: Yǔhuātíng jiēdào) is an urban subdistrict, located in the built-up area of Yuhua District in Changsha City, Hunan Province, China. New Yuhuating was formed in 2012, the former Yuhuating subdistrict was divided into two subdistricts, new Yuhuating and Jingwanzi. The subdistrict has borders with Jingwanzi Subdistrict to the south, Guitang Subdistrict to the east, Shazitang Subdistrict to the north, and Wenyuan Subdistrict of Tianxin District to the west. It covers 8 km^{2} (3.1 sq mi) with a population of roughly 58,000 (as of 2012). The administrative centre is at 34 Shima road (Yatangcun community).
