= Zuojiatang =

Zuojiatang subdistrict 左家塘街道
- Subdistrict
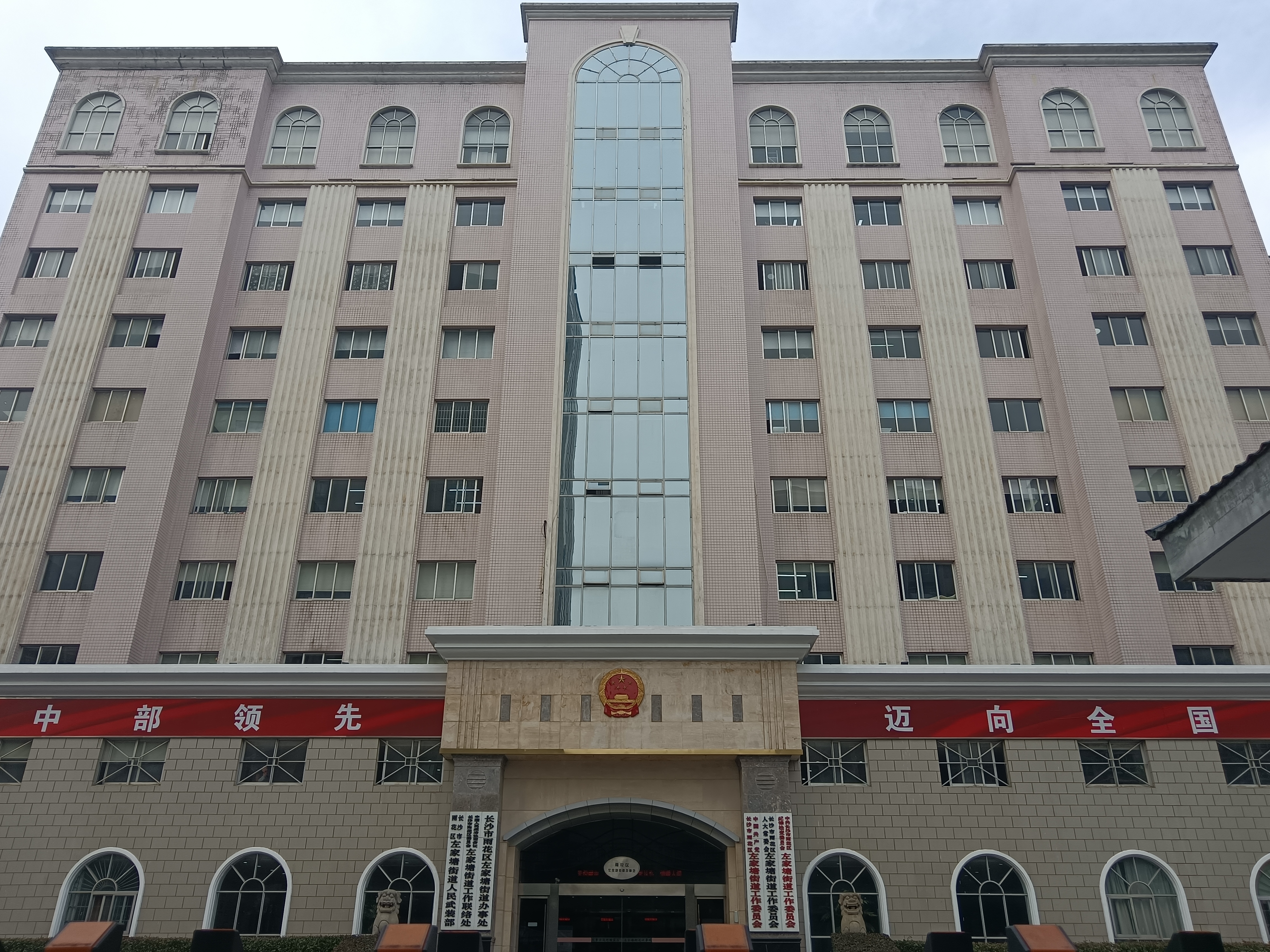
- Interactive map of Zuojiatang subdistrict
- Coordinates: 28.170507400°N 113.00835786°E
- Country: People's Republic of China
- Province: Hunan
- Prefecture-level city: Changsha
- District: Yuhua

Area
  - Total: 7.8 km^{2} (3.0 sq mi)

Population (2010 census)
  - Total: 128,641
  - Density: 16,000/km^{2} (43,000/sq mi)
- Time zone: UTC+8 (China Standard)

Zuojiatang (Chinese: 左家塘街道; pinyin: Zuǒjiātáng Jiēdào) is an urban subdistrict, located on the northwest of Yuhua District in Changsha City, Hunan Province, China. The subdistrict has borders with Shazitang Subdistrict to the south, Gaoqiao Subdistrict to the east, Wenyilu Subdistrict of Furong District to the north, and Dingwangtai and Wenyilu Subdistricts of Tianxin District to the west. It covers 7.8 km^{2} (3.0 sq mi) with a population of roughly 170,000, as of 2010 census population of 128,641.
