= Da'an Temple =

Buddhist temple in Changsha, China

- 大安寺
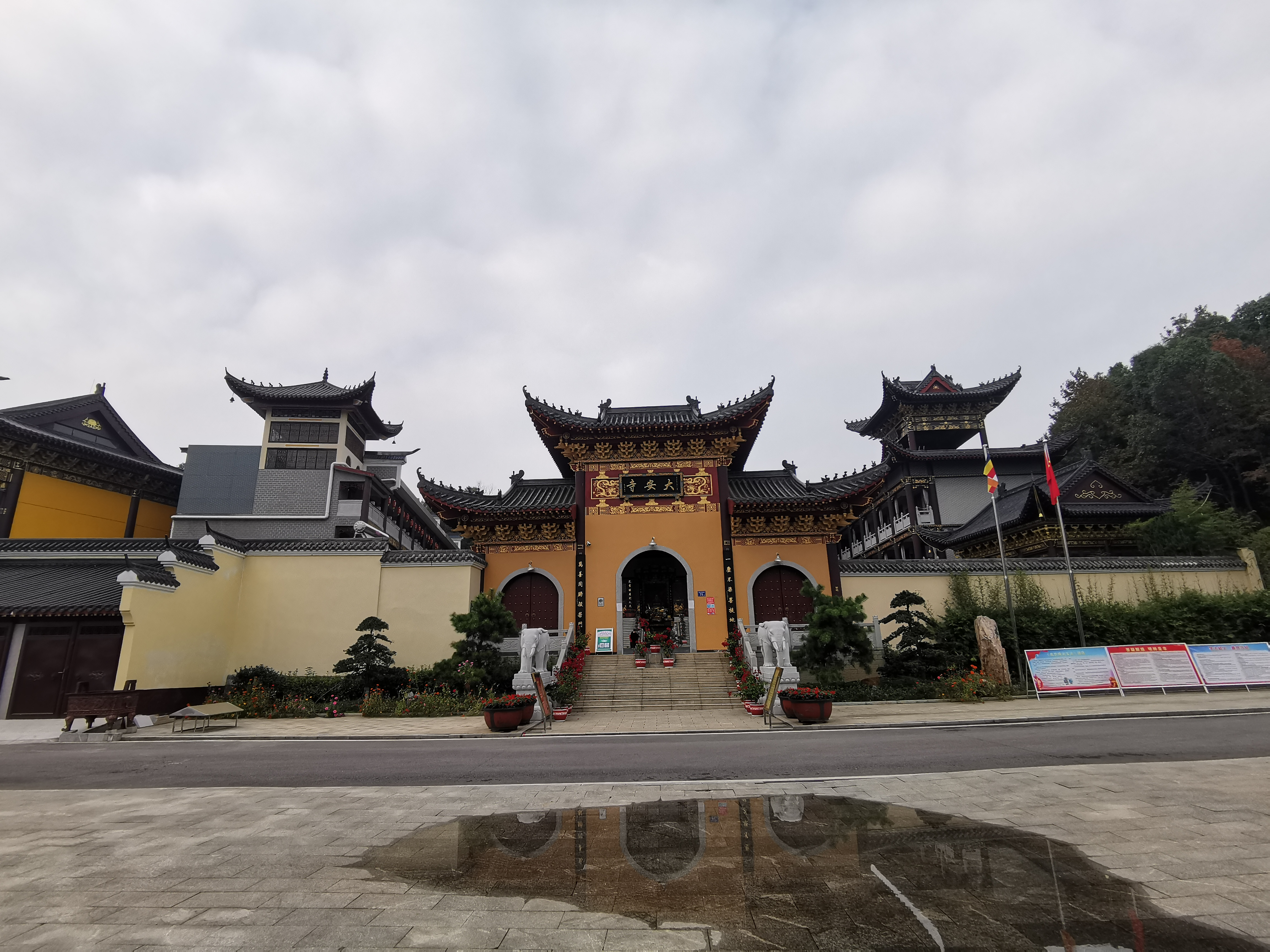
- Shanmen Hall

- Location within Hunan

Religion
- Affiliation: Buddhism
- Sect: Chan Buddhism
- Leadership: Shi Wuxin

Location
- Location: Tiaoma, Yuhua District, Changsha, Hunan
- Interactive map of Da'an Temple
- Coordinates: 28°04′27.56″N 113°04′53.22″E

Architecture
- Style: Chinese architecture
- Established: Qing dynasty
- Groundbreaking: 1997 (reconstruction)
- Completed: 2020 (reconstruction)

Da'an Temple (Chinese: 大安寺; pinyin: Dà'ān Sì) is a Buddhist temple located in Yuhua District, Changsha, Hunan, China.

== History ==
The original temple dates back to the Qing dynasty (1644–1911).

After the founding of the Communist State, in 1952, the Communist Party launched the Land Reform Movement in which the temple was demolished. Reconstruction of the temple, commenced in 1997 and was completed in 2020.

== Architecture ==
Now the existing main buildings include Shanmen Hall, Mahavira Hall, Kṣitigarbha Hall and Guanyin Hall.

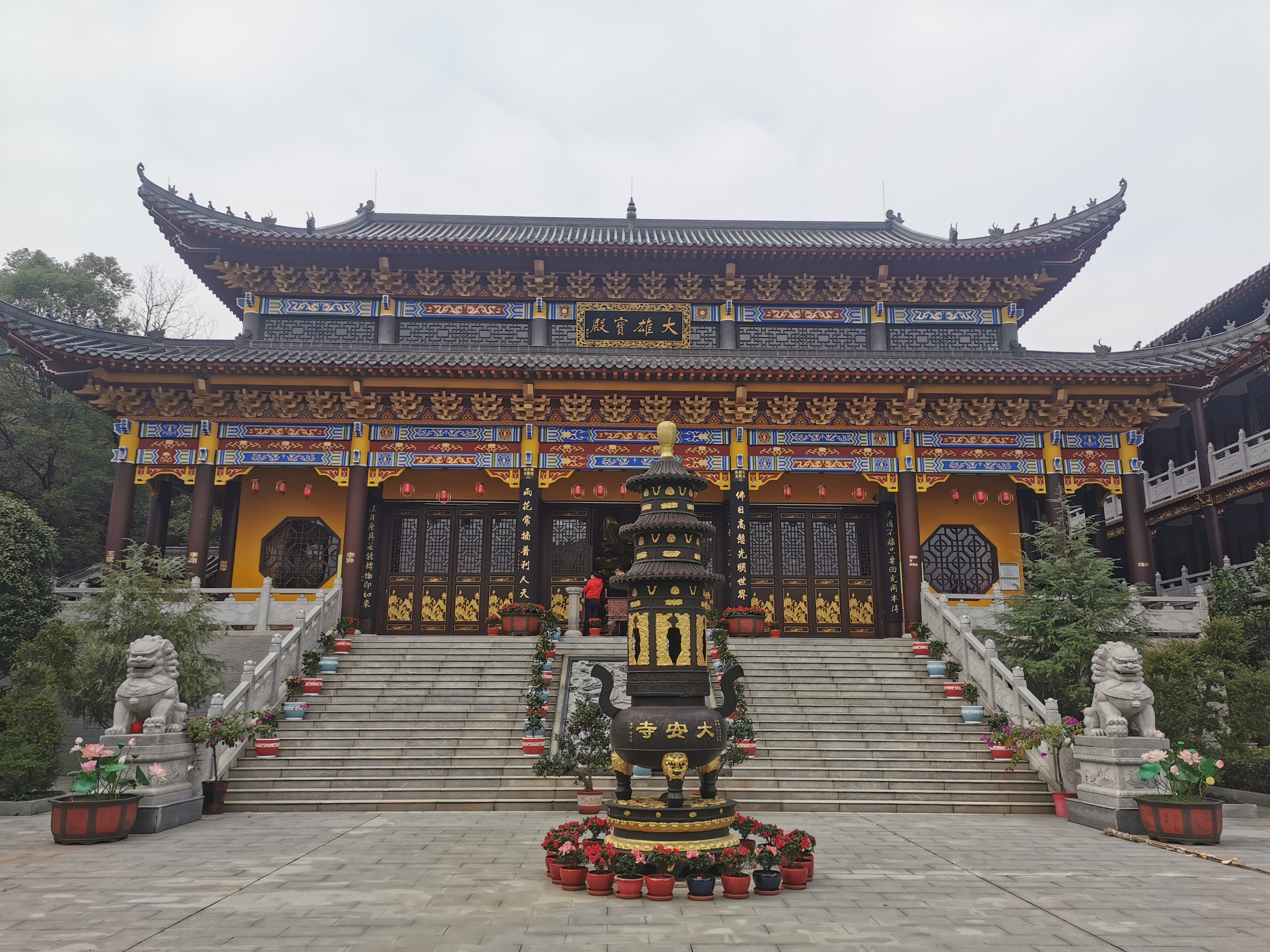
Mahavira Hall

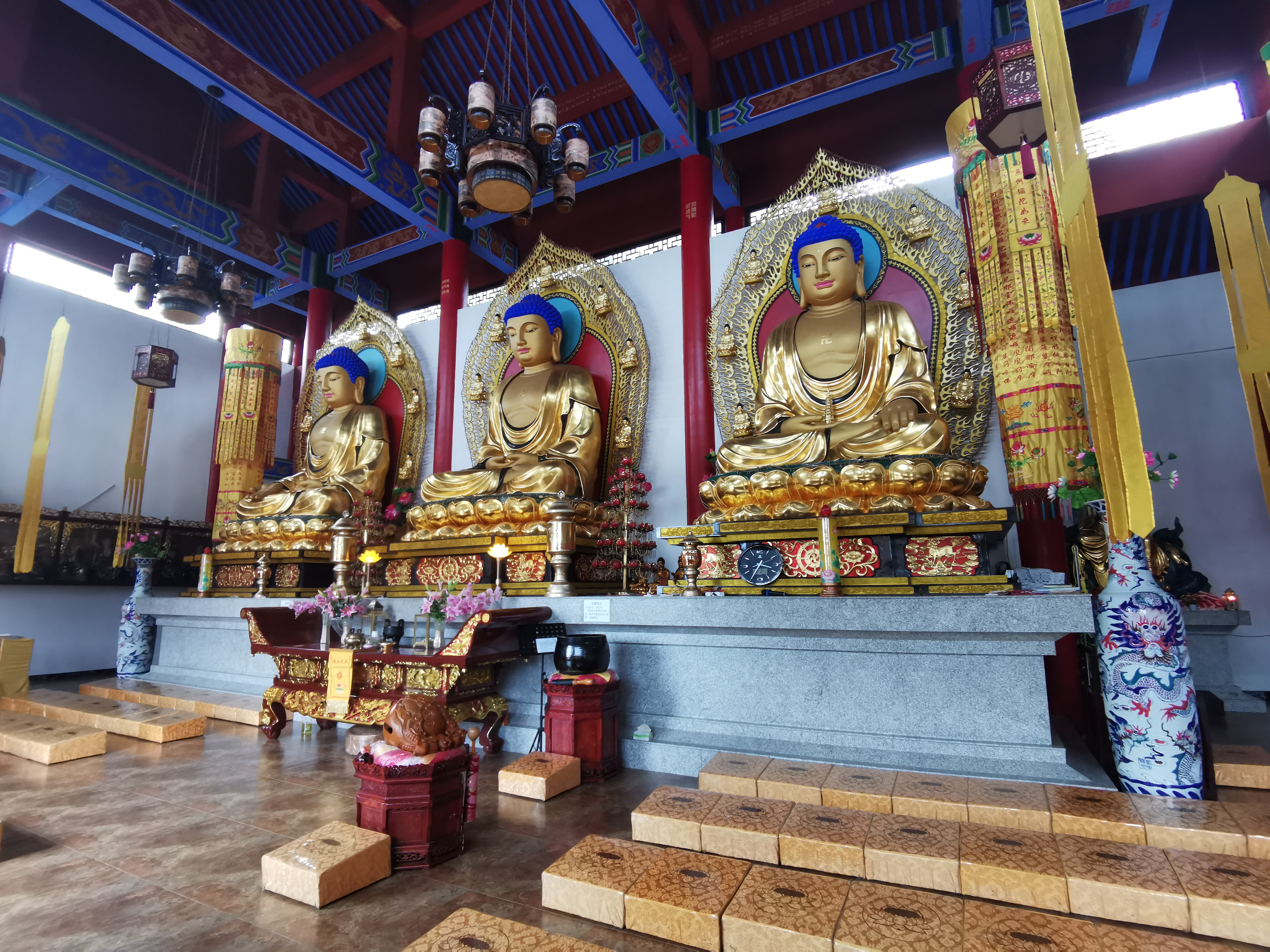
Statues of Buddha at Mahavira Hall

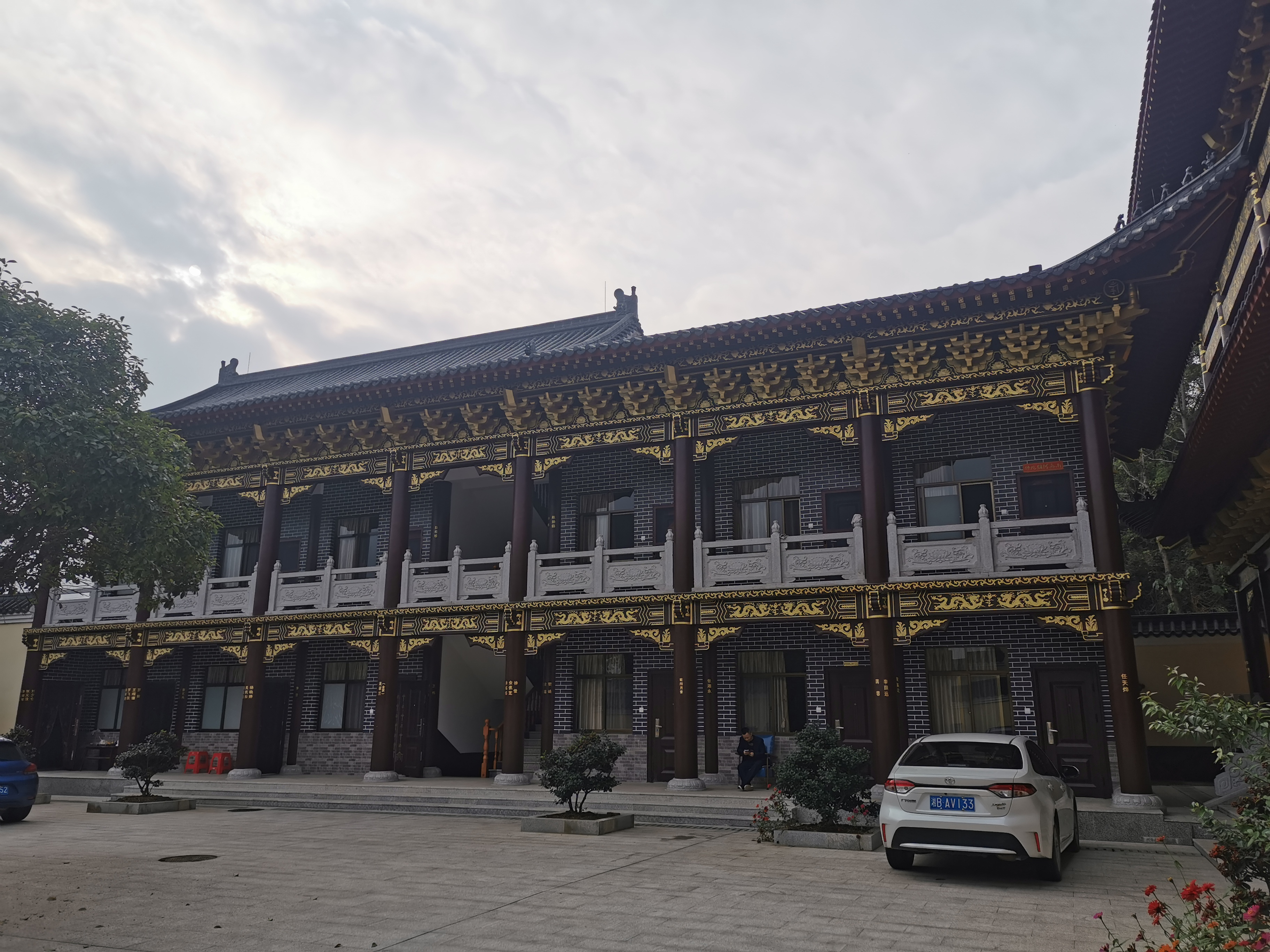
Reception rooms

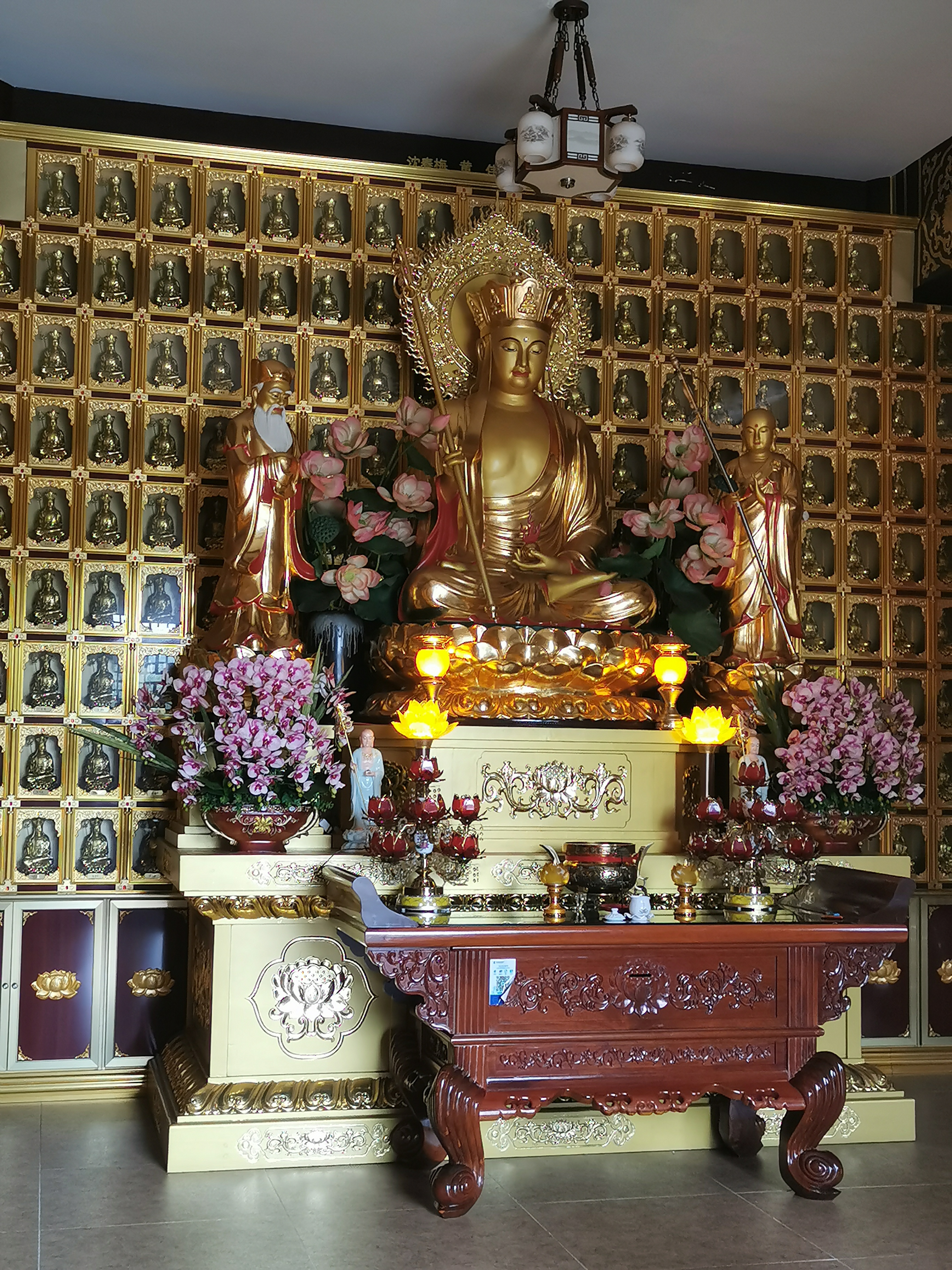
Statue of Kṣitigarbha.

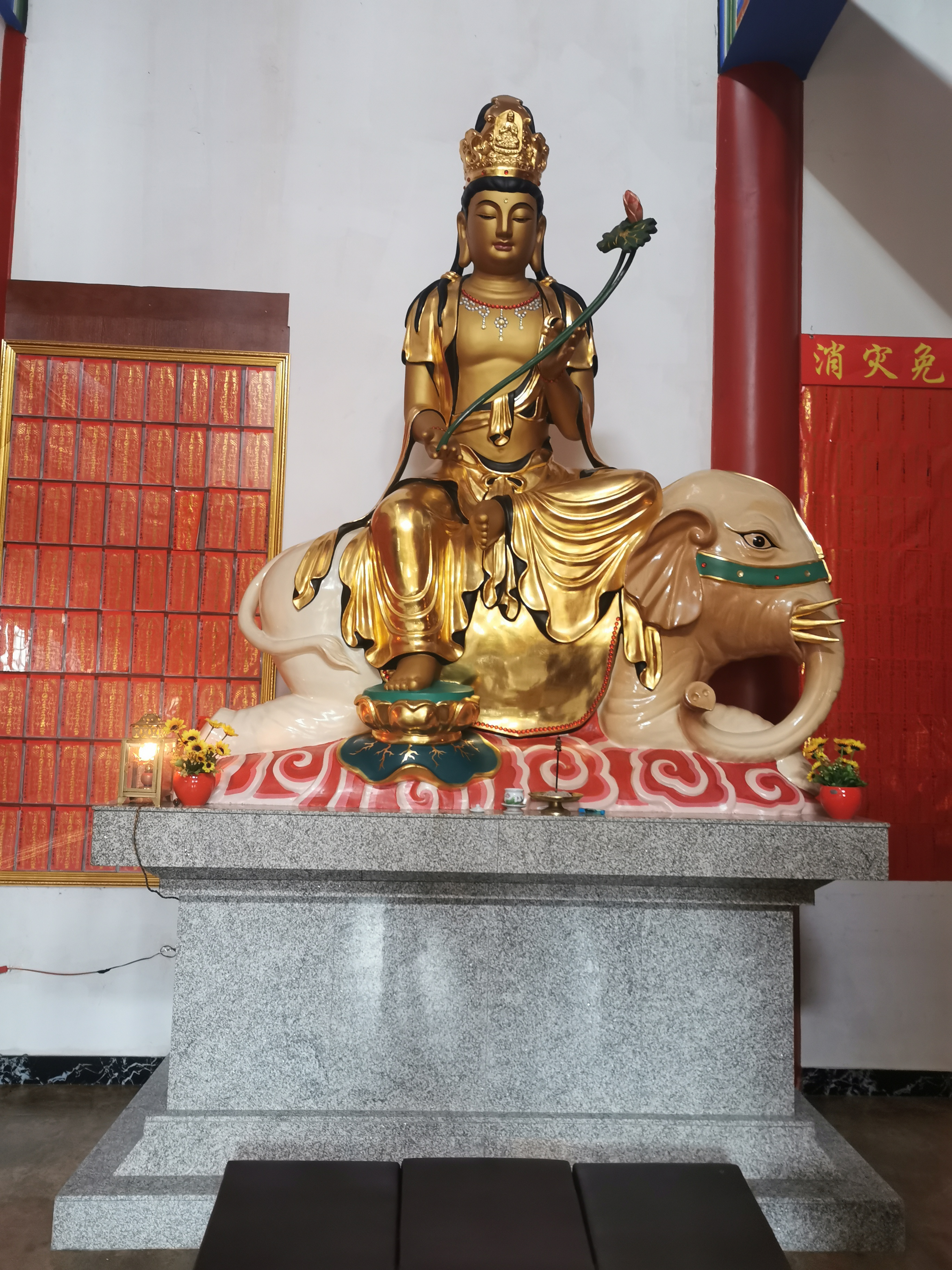
Statue of Samantabhadra.

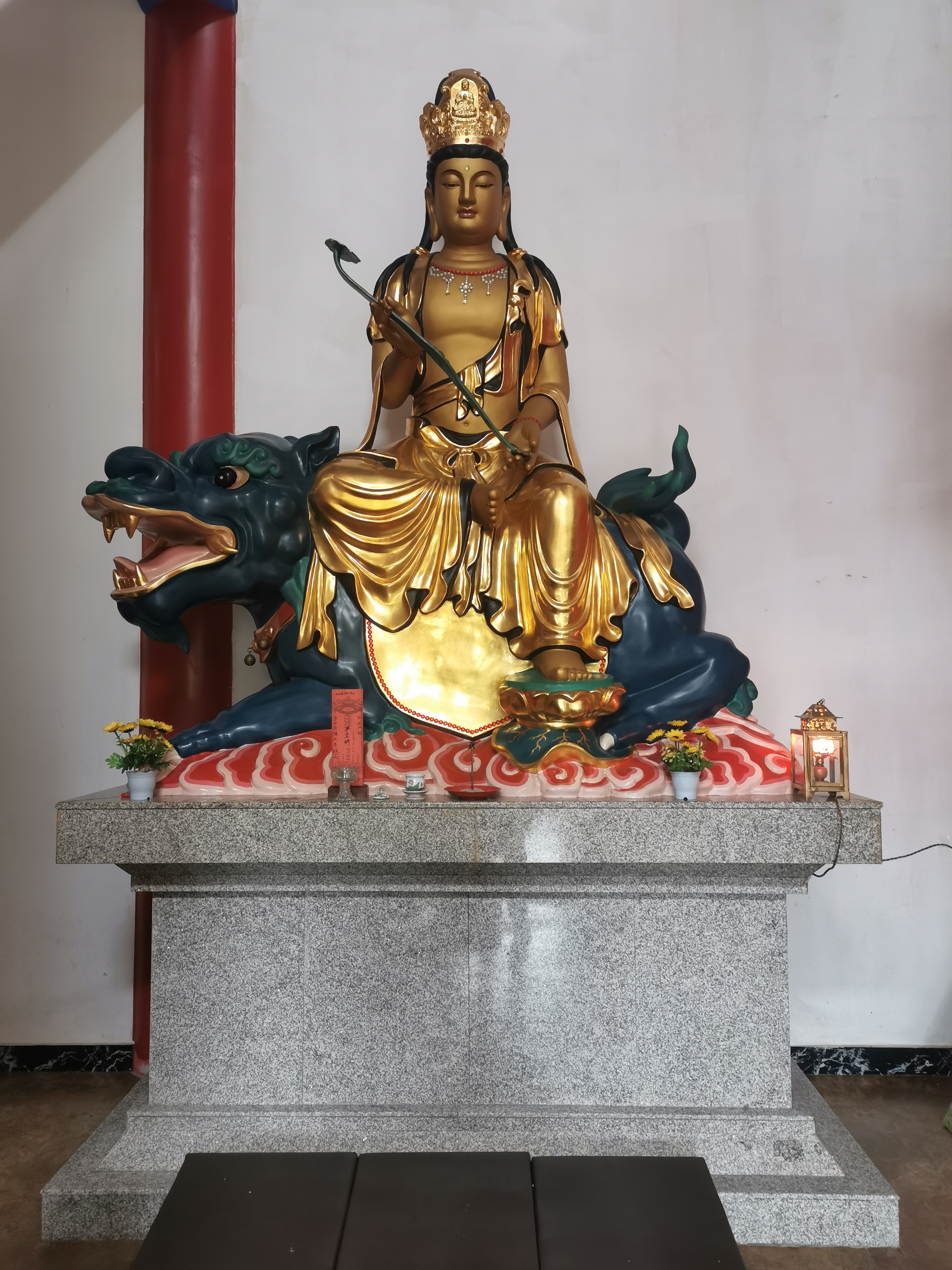
Statue of Manjushri.
