= Jingwanzi =

Jingwanzi Subdistrict 井湾子街道
- Subdistrict
- Interactive map of Jingwanzi Subdistrict
- Coordinates: 28.12407°N 113.02372°E
- Country: People's Republic of China
- Province: Hunan
- Prefecture-level city: Changsha
- District: Yuhua

Area
  - Total: 9.8 km^{2} (3.8 sq mi)

Population (2012)
  - Total: 73,000
  - Density: 7,400/km^{2} (19,000/sq mi)
- Time zone: UTC+8 (China Standard)

Jingwanzi (simplified Chinese: 井湾子街道; traditional Chinese: 井灣子街道; pinyin: jǐngwānzi jiēdào) is an urban subdistrict, located in the built-up area of Yuhua District in Changsha City, Hunan Province, China. The new Jingwanzi was formed in 2012, the former Yuhuating subdistrict was divided into two subdistricts, new Yuhuating and Jingwanzi. The subdistrict has borders with Dongjing Subdistrict to the south, Lituo Subdistrict to the east, Yuhuating Subdistrict to the north, and Wenyuan and Qingyuan Subdistricts of Tianxin District to the west. It covers 9.8 km^{2} (3.8 sq mi) with a population of roughly 73,000 (as of 2012).
