= Dongtundu =

Dongtundu 东屯渡
- Subdistrict
- Location in Hunan
- Coordinates: 28°11′26″N 113°02′19″E
- Country: People's Republic of China
- Province: Hunan
- Prefecture-level city: Changsha
- District: Furong District

Area
  - Total: 2.66 km^{2} (1.03 sq mi)

Population (2012)
  - Total: 45,000
  - Density: 17,000/km^{2} (44,000/sq mi)
- Time zone: UTC+8 (China Standard)

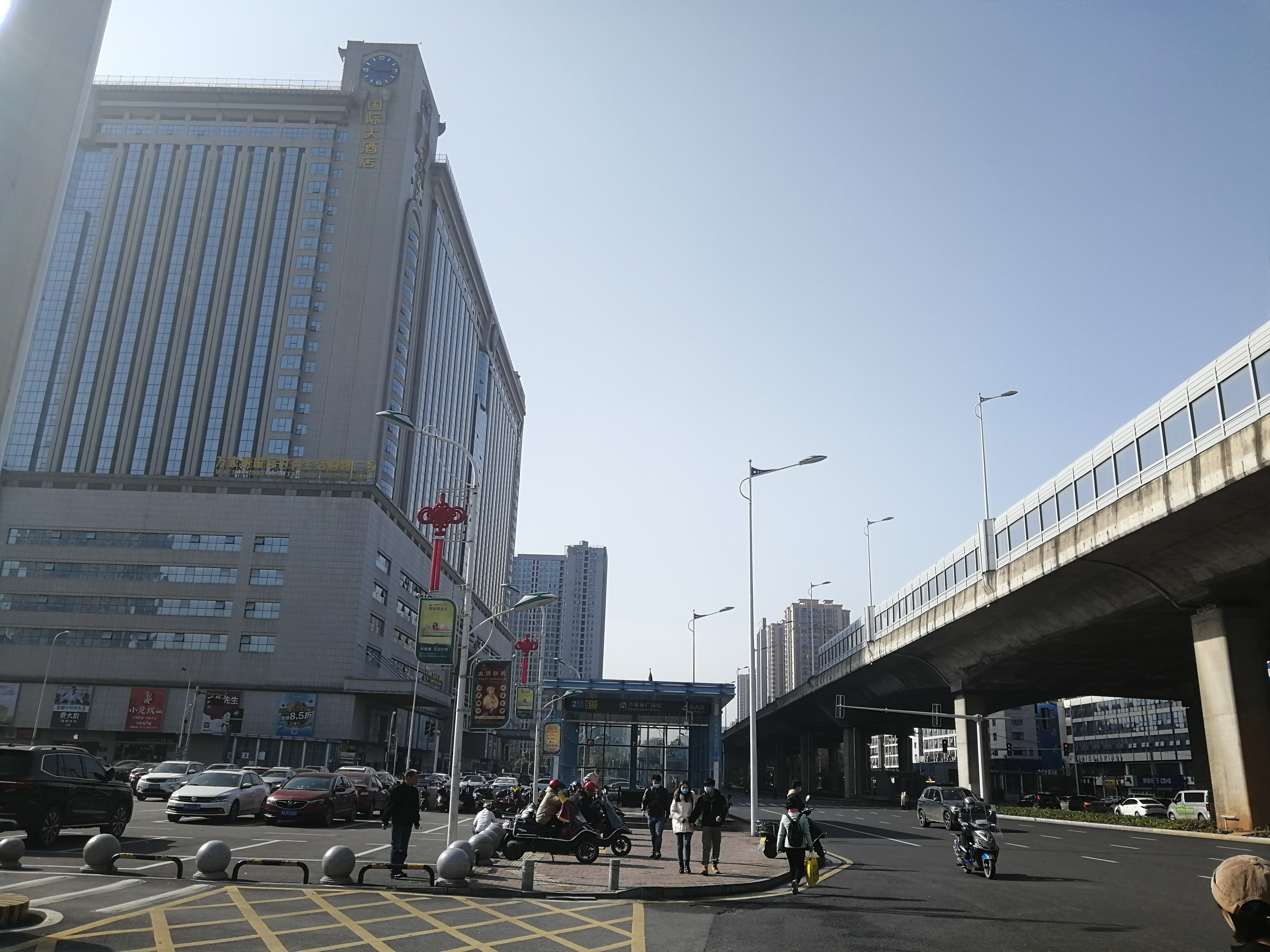
Wanjiali Square Station & surrounding areas

Dongtundu Subdistrict (simplified Chinese: 东屯渡街道; traditional Chinese: 東屯渡街道; pinyin: Dōngtúndù jiēdào) is an urban subdistrict and the seat of Furong District, Changsha City, Hunan Province, China. The subdistrict is located in the south central part of the district. It borders Hehuayuan Subdistrict to the west, Huoxing and Mawangdui Subdistricts to the north, Dong'an Subdistrict to the east, Gaoqiao Subdistrict of Yuhua District. Dongtundu covers 2.66 km^{2} (1.03 sq mi), and it is divided into five communities and a village under its jurisdiction.

== History ==
The subdistrict of Dongtundu was formerly the State-owned Dongtundu Farm established in 1959. It was transferred to the jurisdiction of Furong District in the 1996 municipal districts of adjustment of Changsha. In September 1998, Dongtundu Subdistrict Office was formally listed, maintaining the structure of the state-owned Dongtundu Farm, implementing a management model with two brands and a group management team. In 2012, the subdivisions in Furong District were adjusted. The newly established Dongtundu Subdistrict maintained four communities of Dongtundu (东屯渡社区), Furong (芙蓉社区), Yangfan (扬帆社区) and Jiayu (嘉雨社区) of the former Dongtundu Subdistrict, the village of Nongke (农科村) was transferred to it from the former Mawangdui Subdistrict. The four communities of Hehuayuan (荷花园社区), Dezhengyuan (德政园社区), Dongfang Xincheng (东方新城社区) and Dongjun (东郡社区) were transferred out of the subdistrict. Dongtundu Subdistrict administers five communities of Dongtundu, Furong, Yangfan, Jiayu and Baishawan, and Nongke Village.

== Subdivisions ==
The subdistrict of Dongtundu administered a village and five communities in 2015. Through the amalgamation of village-level divisions in 2016, its divisions were reduced to five from six. The subdistrict has five communities under its jurisdiction.

- Baishawan Community (白沙湾社区)
- Dongtundu Community (东屯渡社区)
- Furong Community (芙蓉社区)
- Jiayu Community (嘉雨社区)
- Yangfan Community (扬帆社区)
