= Tiaoma, Changsha =

Tiaoma Town 跳马镇
- Town
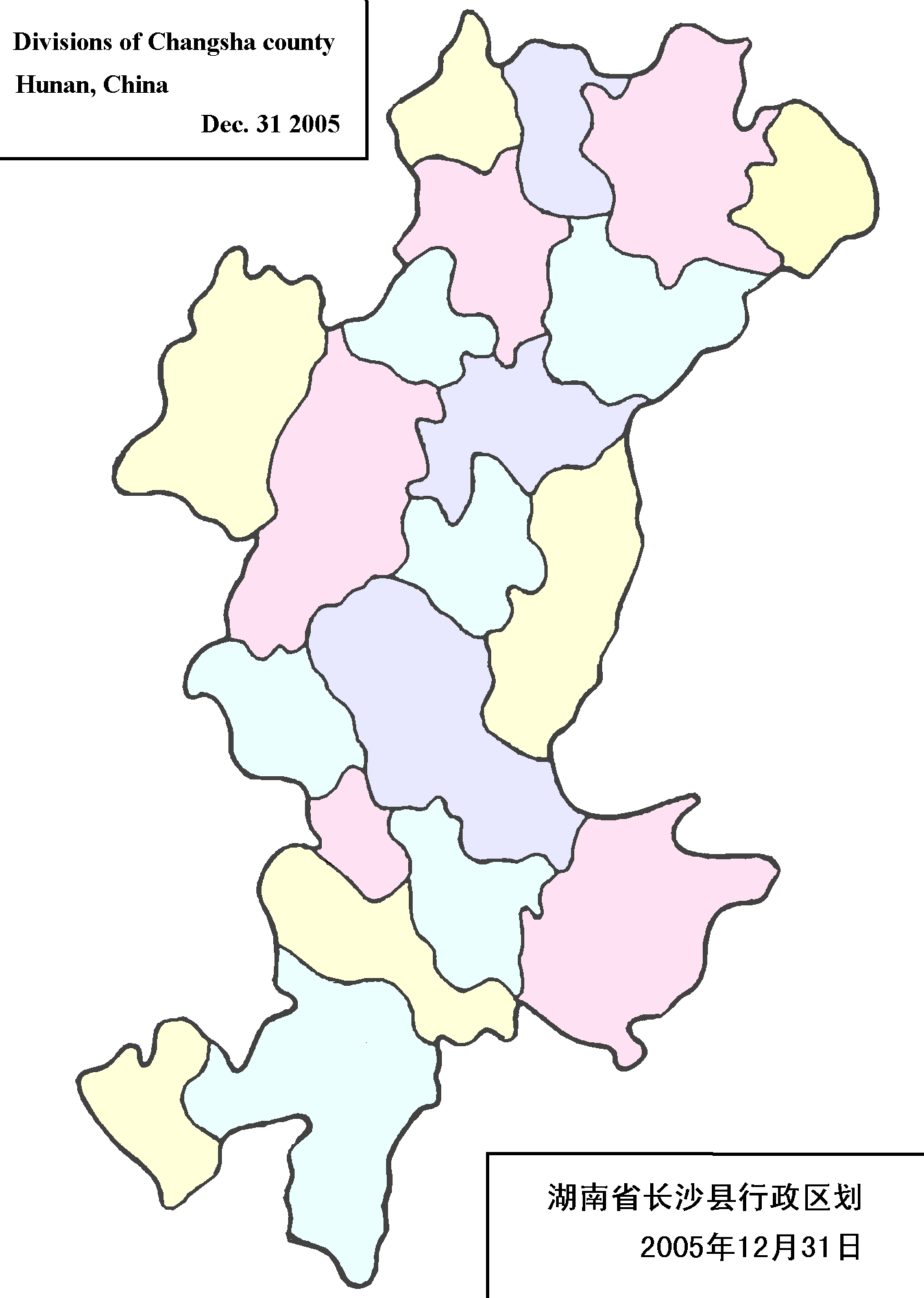
- Interactive map of Tiaoma Town
- Coordinates: 28.0556°N 113.068°E
- Country: China
- Province: Hunan
- Prefecture-level city: Changsha
- District: Yuhua

Area
  - Total: 65 km^{2} (25 sq mi)

Population (2,000)
  - Total: 19,093
  - Density: 290/km^{2} (760/sq mi)
- Time zone: UTC+8 (China Standard)

Tiaoma Town (simplified Chinese: 跳马镇; traditional Chinese: 跳馬鎮; pinyin: Tiàomǎ Zhèn), is an urban town in Yuhua District, Changsha, Hunan Province, China. It is surrounded by Zhaoshan Township and Muyun Town on the west, Dongjingpu Town and Huangxing Town on the north, Baijia Town and Yuntian Township on the east, and Longtoupu Town, Hetangpu Town and Baima Town on the south.

== Administrative divisions ==
The town is divided into two villages and 17 communities, which include the following areas: Jinping Community, Banzhutang Community, Shuangxicun Village, Baizhu Village, Shiyanhu Village, Tianxinqiao Village, Xintian Village, Xiyu Village, Dongsigang Village, Shuguangyuan Village, Meiyiling Village, Shiqiao Village, Sanxianling Village, Guandaocun Village, Songshan Village, Tiaoma Village, Fuxing Village, Yanglin Village, and Shaxian Village (金屏社区、斑竹塘社区、双溪村、白竹村、石燕湖村、田心桥村、新田村、喜雨村、冬斯港村、曙光垸村、梅怡岭村、石桥村、三仙岭村、关刀村、嵩山村、跳马村、复兴村、杨林村、沙仙村).

== Tourist attractions ==
The town boasts many cultural and historical relics, including Da'an Temple and Tomb of Zuo Zongtang.
