= Wenyuan =

Wenyuan (Chinese: 文元) is a Chinese masculine given name. Notable people with the name include:

- Chen Wenyuan (born 1979), Hong Kong singer and model
- Diao Wenyuan (born 1943), Chinese table tennis player
- Li Wenyuan (born 1977), Malaysian taekwondo practitioner
- Wang Wenyuan (1931–2014), Chinese politician
- Xǔ Wényuǎn (born 1952), Malaysian-born Singaporean politician
- Yao Wenyuan (1931–2005), Chinese politician
- Zhang Wenyuan, multiple people
- Zhou Wenyuan (born 1940), Chinese Army general
