= Mawangdui Subdistrict =

Coordinates: 28.1912°N 113.0130°E

Mawangdui 马王堆街道
- Subdistrict
- Interactive map of Mawangdui
- Country: People's Republic of China
- Province: Hunan
- Prefecture-level city: Changsha
- District: Furong

Population (2012)
  - Total: 54,600
- Time zone: UTC+8 (China Standard)

The Mawangdui subdistrict (simplified Chinese: 马王堆街道; traditional Chinese: 馬王堆街道; pinyin: mǎwángduī jiēdào) is a subdistrict of Furong District, Changsha, Hunan. It is located on the central east of Furong. The subdistrict is bordered by Xianghu to the west, Huoxing and Dongtundu subdistricts to the south, Mapoling to the east, and Kaifu District across the Liuyang River to the north. Mawangdui is subdivided into three communities and two villages, with a population of 54,600 in 2012.

The place is famous for the archaeological excavations of the Mawangdui western Han tombs, which are located at the central south of Mawangdui subdistrict. The tombs were excavated from 1972 to 1974, and all the artifacts from the tombs are on display at the Hunan Provincial Museum. The archaeological site is one of the important tourist and cultural attractions in Changsha.
