= Zhang Wenyuan =

Zhang Wenyuan may refer to:

- Zhang Liao (169–222), courtesy name Wenyuan, Chinese military general
- Zhang Wenyuan (Water Margin), fictional character in Water Margin
