= Furong, Changsha =

Furong 芙蓉区
- District
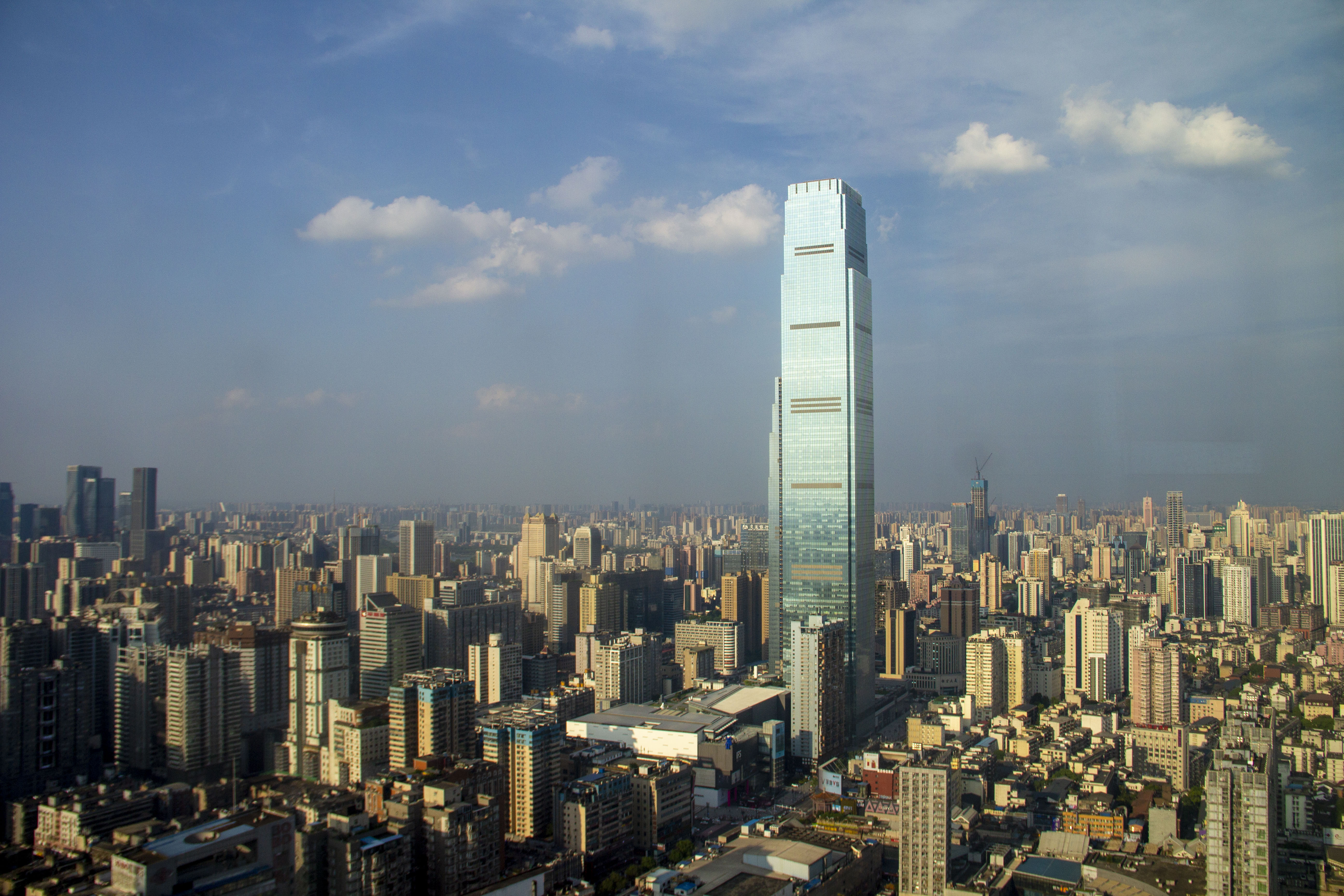

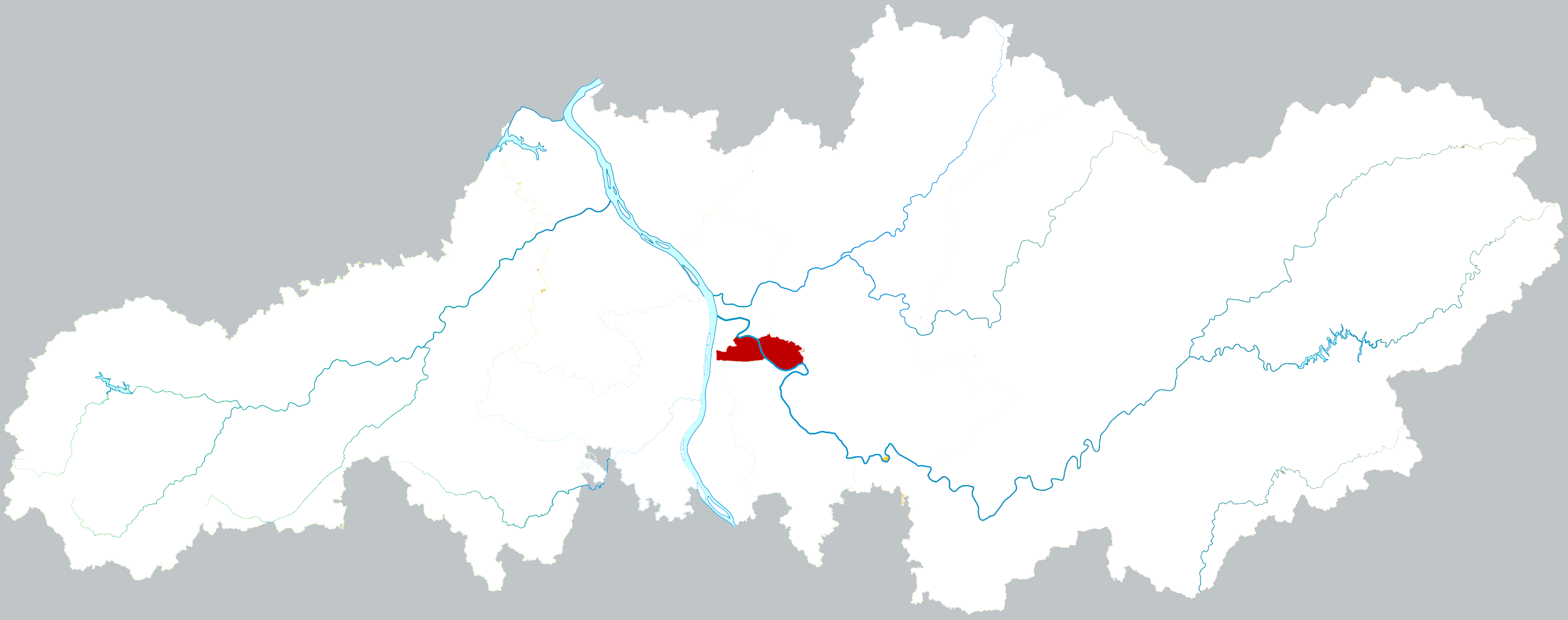
- Location of Furong District within Changsha

- Location in Hunan
- Coordinates: 28°11′53″N 113°02′34″E
- Country: China
- Province: Hunan
- Prefecture-level city: Changsha
- District seat: Dongtundu Subdistrict

Area
  - Total: 42.68 km^{2} (16.48 sq mi)

Population (2020 census)
  - Total: 642,010
  - Density: 15,040/km^{2} (38,960/sq mi)
- Time zone: UTC+8 (China Standard)
- Website: www.furong.gov.cn

Furong District (simplified Chinese: 芙蓉区; traditional Chinese: 芙蓉區; pinyin: Fúróng Qū; lit. 'Hibiscus mutabilis') is one of six urban districts of the prefecture-level city of Changsha, Hunan Province, China. It is the smallest district of Changsha by area. Furong District is a part of the core of the Changsha urban area, located in the midst of the city. The district is bordered by Yuhua District to the south, Changsha County to the east, Kaifu District to the northwest, and Tianxin District to the southwest. Furong covers 42.68 km^{2} (16.48 sq mi) with population of 539,200 (as of 2014), registered population of 403,948. The district has 13 subdistricts under its jurisdiction. The government seat is at Dongtundu subdistrict.

== History ==
Furong District was formed on 22 April 1996 as a result of adjusting the administrative districts of Changsha. It covers most of the land of the historic East District, including Jiucaiyuan (韭菜园), Fuhoujie (府后街), Wulipai (五里牌), Liuzhengjie (浏正街), Wenyilu (文艺路), Jiefanglu (解放路), Duzhengjie (都正街), Chaoyanglu (朝阳街) and Renminlu (人民路) 9 subdistricts; parts of the former Suburb District, of which are Xianghu Fish Farm (湘湖渔场), state-run Dongtundu Farm (国营东屯渡农场), Huoxing Town (火星镇), Dong'an Township (东岸乡) and Mawangdui Township (马王堆乡) in which excluding Wuyi, Huoxian, Youyi and Gaoqiao 4 villages.

The Shaoguang Community (韶光社区) was merged into Dong'an Township from Langli Town of Changsha County on 8 August 2008.

== Subdivision ==
Furong has 13 subdistricts under its jurisdiction.

13 subdistricts

- Chaoyangjie (朝阳街街道)
- Dingwangtai (定王台街道)
- Dong'an (东岸街道)
- Donghu (东湖街道)
- Dongtundu (东屯渡街道)
- Hehuayuan (荷花园街道)
- Huoxing (火星街道)
- Jiucaiyuan (韭菜园街道)
- Mapoling (马坡岭街道)
- Mawangdui (马王堆街道)
- Wenyilu (文艺路街道)
- Wulipai (五里牌街道)
- Xianghu (湘湖街道)

== Economy ==
According to preliminary accounting of the statistical authority, the gross domestic product of Furong District in 2017 was 130,159 million yuan (19,278 million US dollars), up by 9 percent over the previous year. Of this total, the value added of the primary industry was 81 million yuan (12 million US dollars), up by -45.2 percent, that of the secondary industry was 17,907 million yuan (2,652 million US dollars), up by 2.2 percent, and that of the tertiary industry was 112,244 million yuan (16,624 million US dollars), up by 10.2 percent. The value added of the primary industry accounted for 0.06 percent of the GDP; that of the secondary industry accounted for 13.76 percent; and that of the tertiary industry accounted for 86.24 percent.
