= Yuhua, Changsha =

Yuhua 雨花区
- District
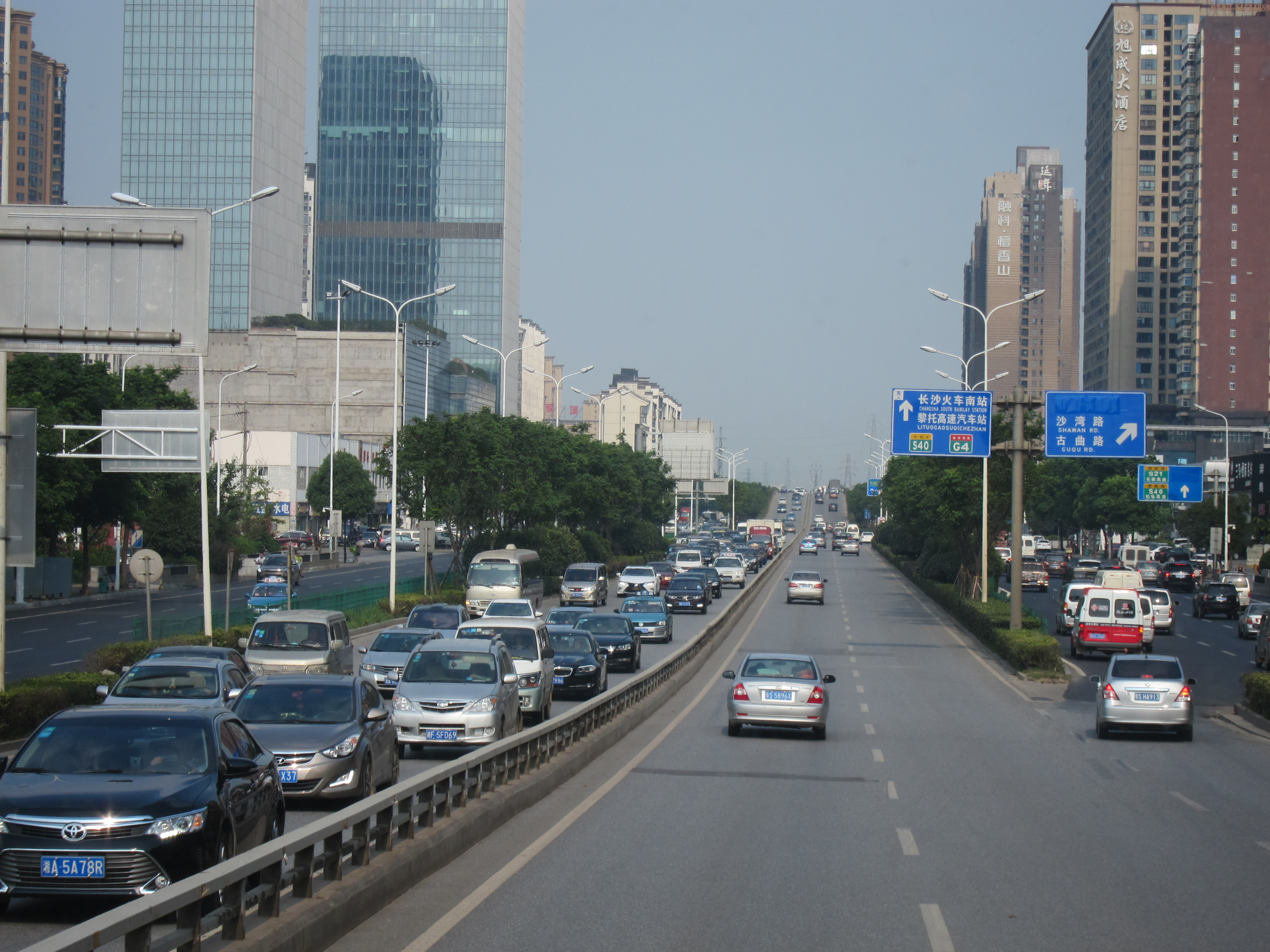
- Changsha Avenue near Changsha South railway station

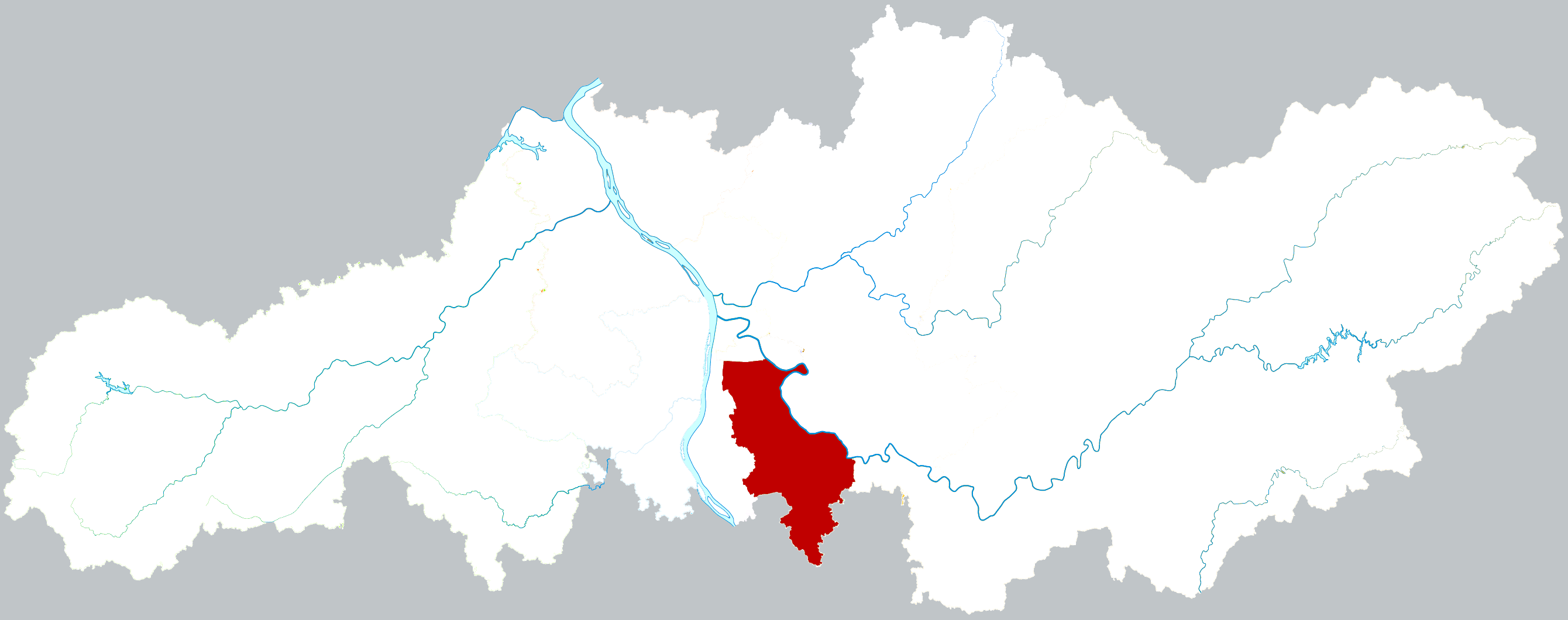
- Location of Yuhua District within Changsha

- Location in Hunan
- Coordinates: 28°08′10″N 113°02′24″E
- Country: People's Republic of China
- Province: Hunan
- Prefecture-level city: Changsha
- Seat: Guitang

Area
  - Total: 304.9 km^{2} (117.7 sq mi)

Population (2016)
  - Total: 764,700
  - Density: 2,508/km^{2} (6,496/sq mi)
- Time zone: UTC+8 (China Standard)

Yuhua District (simplified Chinese: 雨花区; traditional Chinese: 雨花區; pinyin: Yǔhuā Qū; lit. 'rain flower') is one of six urban districts of the prefecture-level city of Changsha, the capital of Hunan Province, China. The district is bordered by Yuetang District of Xiangtan to the south, Changsha County to the east, Furong District to the north, Tianxin District to the west. Located in the southern central Changsha, Yuhua covers 304.9 km^{2} (117.7 sq mi) with population of 764,700 (as of 2016). The district has 12 subdistricts and 1 town under its jurisdiction. Its administrative centre is at Guitang subdistrict.

== History ==
Yuhua District is one of five districts established on 22 April 1996 as a result of adjusting the administrative districts of Changsha. It covers parts of the historic South District, in which Zuojiajitang (左家塘), Houjiatang (候家塘), Jingwanzi (井湾子) and Guitang (圭搪) four subdistricts included, parts of the historic Suburb District, in which Yuhuating Township (雨花亭乡) excluding Shiren (石人), Xinkai (新开) and Yuchang (渔场) three villages, Lituo Township (黎托乡), Dongjing Township (洞井乡), Wuyi (五一), Huoyan (火焰), Youyi (友谊) and Gaoqiao (高桥) four villages of Mawangdui Township (马王堆乡).

Tiaoma Town (跳马镇) of Changsha County was also added to Yuhua District on 14 January 2015.

== Subdivisions ==
According to the No.1 Notice on adjustment of administrative divisions of Hunan Province in 2015 published on February 27, 2015, Yuhua has 12 subdistricts and 1 town under its jurisdiction. They are:

12 subdistricts

- Dongjing (洞井街道)
- Dongshan (东山街道)
- Dongtang (东塘街道)
- Gaoqiao (高桥街道)
- Guitang (圭塘街道)
- Houjiatang (侯家塘街道)
- Jingwanzi (井湾子街道)
- Lituo (黎圫街道)
- Shazitang (砂子塘街道)
- Tongsheng (同升街道)
- Yuhuating (雨花亭街道)
- Zuojiatang (左家塘街道)

1 town

- Tiaoma (跳马镇)

== Economy ==
According to preliminary accounting of the statistical authority, the gross domestic product of Yuhua District in 2017 was 123,087 million yuan (18,230 million US dollars), up by 8.9 percent over the previous year. Of this total, the value added of the primary industry was 574 million yuan (85 million US dollars), up by -15.6 percent, that of the secondary industry was 40,391 million yuan (5,982 million US dollars), up by 6.3 percent and that of the tertiary industry was 82,122 million yuan (12,163 million US dollars), up by 12 percent. The value added of the primary industry accounted for 0.47 percent of the GDP; that of the secondary industry accounted for 32.82 percent; and that of the tertiary industry accounted for 66.72 percent. The per capita GDP by the population of mid-year permanent residents in 2017 was about 138,611 yuan (20,529 US dollars).
