= Jewish-American patronage of Chinese restaurants =

Aspect of Jewish-American culture

Jewish-American patronage of Chinese restaurants is a cultural phenomenon, particularly associated with Christmas, that emerged in American Jewish culture in early 20th century New York City.

The tradition developed as large Jewish and Chinese immigrant communities lived in close proximity on Manhattan's Lower East Side. They were, as observers noted, "bound by proximity and otherness" as the two largest non-Christian immigrant groups. Chinese restaurants welcomed Jewish customers compared to the antisemitism Jews experienced in the eateries of other immigrant groups, lacked Christian iconography, and appeared compatible with Jewish dietary laws because the food did not mix milk and meat. Despite the presence of pork and shellfish, the chopping and concealment of ingredients allowed many Jews to view the cuisine as acceptable.

By the 1930s, Chinese restaurants were firmly established in Jewish neighborhoods, and eating Chinese food on Christmas became a ritualized alternative to a holiday not usually celebrated by Jews. Over time, the practice evolved into a marker of American Jewish culture, celebrated for reinforcing community bonds, symbolizing assimilation, and reflecting the ongoing construction of Jewish identity in the United States.

== Historical background ==
According to Jennifer 8. Lee, producer of The Search for General Tso, Jewish and Chinese immigrants in early 20th century New York City were "bound by proximity and otherness." Living side by side on the Lower East Side, they were the two largest non-Christian immigrant groups. By 1910, nearly one million Jews of Eastern European ancestry, over a quarter of the city's population, lived in New York City.

The earliest known reference of Jews eating Chinese food appears in an 1899 issue of The American Hebrew, which criticized Jews for dining in non-kosher restaurants, especially Chinese ones. By 1936, at least 18 Chinese tea gardens and restaurants operated in heavily Jewish neighborhoods like the Lower East Side, all located close to Ratner's, the famed Jewish dairy restaurant.

=== Reasons for appeal ===
In Lower Manhattan, most immigrant eateries served their own communities. Jews ate in Jewish delis, Italians in Italian restaurants, Germans for Germans. Chinese restaurateurs, however, welcomed Jews and other outsiders. In addition, their establishments lacked the Christian iconography common in Italian places. With little antisemitism and no judgement about belonging, Chinese restaurants felt safer and more inclusive for Jewish immigrants.

They also offered a way to appear to follow Jewish dietary laws. Chinese cuisine traditionally did not mix milk and meat, giving an illusion of kashrut. However, the dishes were still treyf because pork and shellfish were common. As Rabbi Joshua Eli Plaut notes, ko p'eng (to cut and cook), the process of cutting, chopping, and mincing, made foods like pork, shrimp, and lobster appear as safe treyf—for example, pork was hidden and wrapped in wontons that looked similar to Jewish kreplach (dumplings)—to Jews seeking to assimilate into American culture.

Ultimately, many American-born Jews came to view kashrut as "impractical and anachronistic". For younger generations, eating Chinese food became a subtle way to break from tradition and offered an escape from Jewish parochialism and the chance to define themselves as modern, urbane New Yorkers. Dining in these unfamiliar, "un-Jewish" spaces, with unusual wallpaper, eccentric decorations, chopsticks, and exotic food names, signaled that these Jews could be "somewhat sophisticated, urbane New Yorkers". "Of all the peoples whom immigrant Jews and their children met, of all the foods they encountered in America, the Chinese were the most foreign, the most 'un-Jewish'."

== Eating on Christmas ==
Before the emancipation of the Jews in Europe, Christmas was a dangerous holiday for Jews. It was a night of drunken violence and sometimes pogroms against the Jewish populations. Jews stayed at home for their safety. In the United States, Jews felt alienated but did not want to stay home.

The tradition of Jews eating Chinese food on Christmas dates to as early as 1935, when The New York Times reported a restaurant owner named Eng Shee Chuck brought chow mein on Christmas Day to the Jewish Children's Home in Newark.

"Over the years, Jewish American families and friends gather on Christmas Eve and Christmas Day at Chinese restaurants across the United States to socialize and to banter, to reinforce social and familiar bonds, and to engage in a favorite activity for Jews during the Christmas holiday. The Chinese restaurant has become a place where Jewish identity is made, remade and announced."

== Cultural significance ==
According to historians, eating Chinese food became a meaningful symbol of American Judaism and part of a ritualized celebration of immigration, education, family, community, and continuity.

Michael Tong of Shun Lee Palace talked about the issue in a 2003 interview with The New York Times:

Welcome to the conundrum that is Christmas New York style: while most restaurants close for the holiday, or in a few cases, stay open and serve a prix fixe meal laden with froufrou, thousands of diners, most of them Jewish, are faced with a dilemma. There's nothing to celebrate at home and no place to eat out, at least if they want a regular dinner. That leaves Chinese restaurants...

== In popular culture ==
- The phenomenon was mentioned on television skits by Jewish comedians Alan King and Buddy Hackett and lampooned on Caesar's Hour by Sid Caesar.
- Philip Roth jokes in Portnoy's Complaint that Chinese restaurateurs thought the Jews' Yiddish-infused English was the King's English.
- During the confirmation hearings for Elena Kagan's nomination to the U.S. Supreme Court in 2010, Senator Lindsey Graham asked where Kagan had been the previous Christmas. Kagan replied, "You know, like all Jews, I was probably at a Chinese restaurant," which drew laughter and media coverage.

== See also ==
- American Chinese cuisine
- History of the Jews in China
- History of the Jews in Taiwan
- Kaifeng Jews
- Jews and Christmas
- Nittel Nacht, Jewish observance on Christmas Eve
