= Fancy Fortune Cookies =

American food company

- Company type: Privately held
- Industry: Confections
- Founded: 1988
- Headquarters: Indianapolis, Indiana
- Area served: Worldwide
- Key people: Mike L. Fry
- Products: Flavored and Chocolate-dipped fortune cookies
- Website: http://www.fancyfortunecookies.com/

Fancy Fortune Cookies is a company, founded by Mike L. Fry in 1988, that produces custom fortune cookies.

== History ==
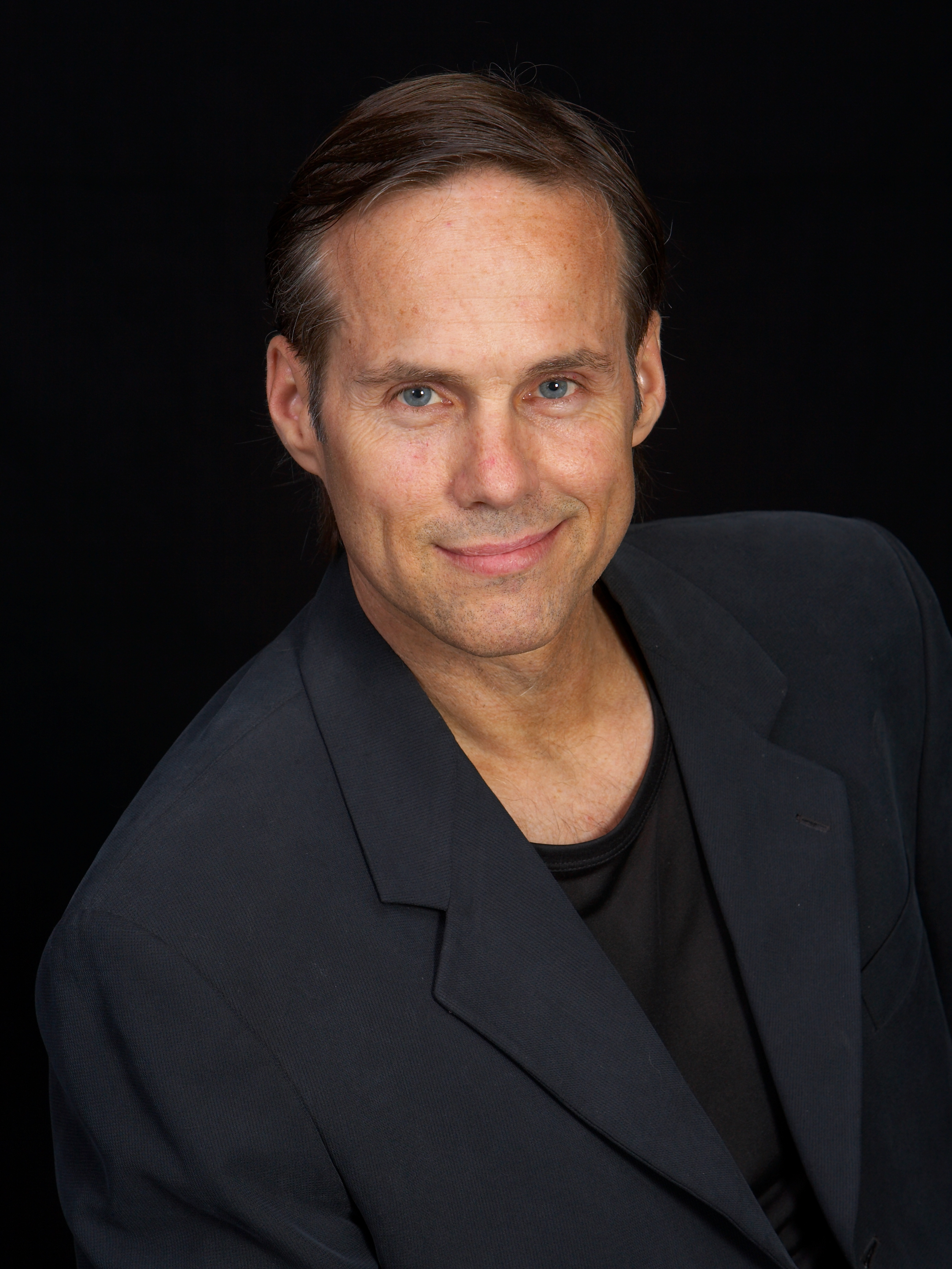
Mike L. Fry

In late 1987, former circus clown and children's show host Mike Fry got the idea to produce custom fortune cookies, and left his job on the children's television series Happy's Place to start the company. It was not until 1990 the company, then marketed under the name Misfortune Kookies and based in Fort Wayne, Indiana, started producing its first five flavors: strawberry, lemon, orange, blueberry, and mint. Their cookies included 100 different comical fortunes, and were carried by Bloomingdale's retail chain, as well as other retail outlets. In 1992, the company relocated to Indianapolis, Indiana, and seven years later moved to its present location and doubled the size of its production facility.

The company created an online retail site in 1995, making it the first on-line seller of flavored and gourmet fortune cookies. It appeared in The Johnson Center for Entrepreneurship & Innovation's 100 Growth report for Indiana businesses two consecutive years, in 1998 and 1999.

The company continued to innovate, introducing giant fortune cookies in 1999. In 2011 they began selling caramel-dipped fortune cookies, another innovation because they don't require special shipping like chocolate-dipped cookies do.

== In the Media ==
Fry's success with Fancy Fortune Cookies has led to him being featured in books and articles. In The Fortune Cookie Chronicles by Jennifer 8. Lee, she mentions Fancy Fortune Cookies, and Mike Fry's invention of the gourmet fortune cookie as part of the history of the fortune cookie. Additionally, he is featured in The One Minute Millionaire by Mark Victor Hansen and Robert Allen in which they discuss Fry's success as an entrepreneur.

== Image gallery ==
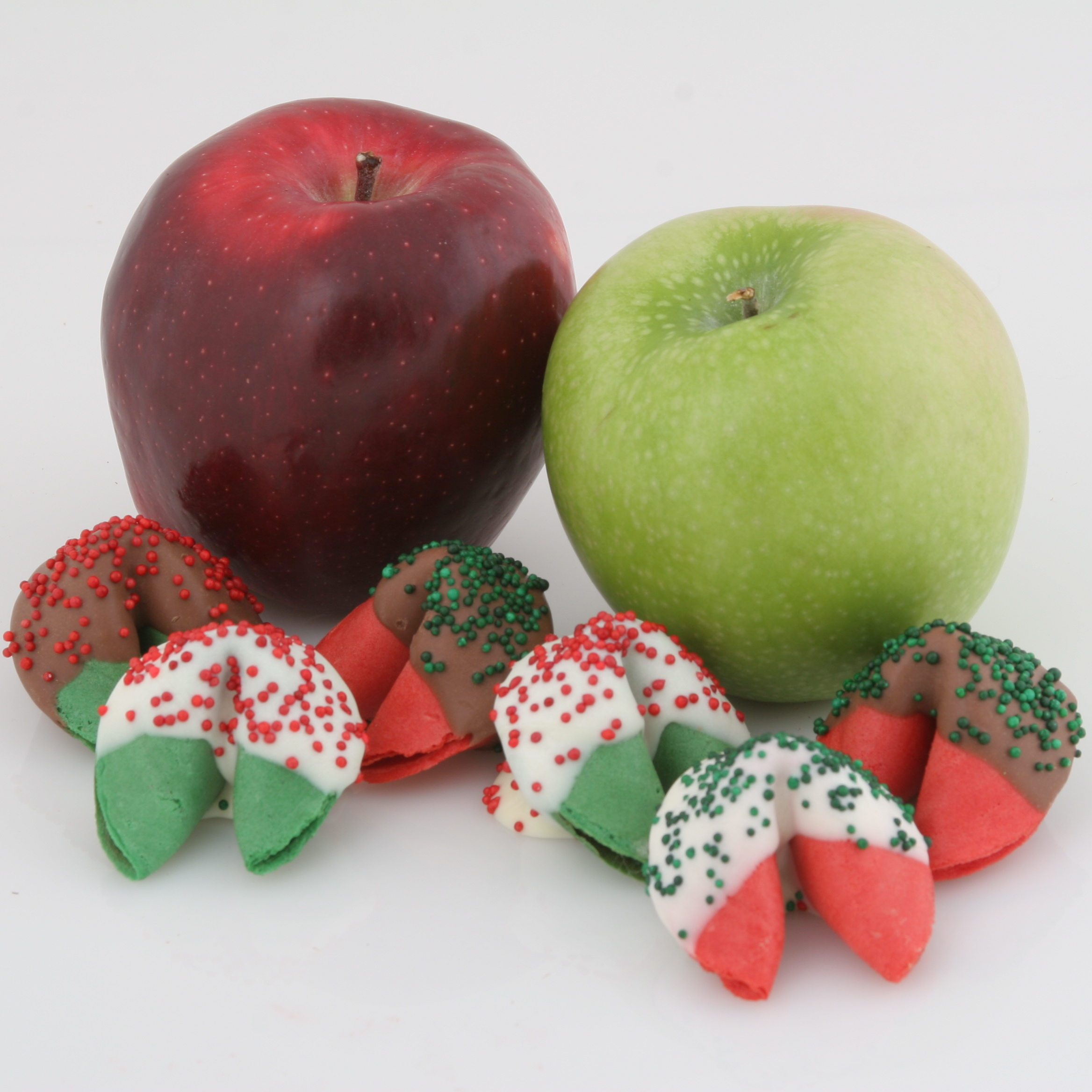
Apple

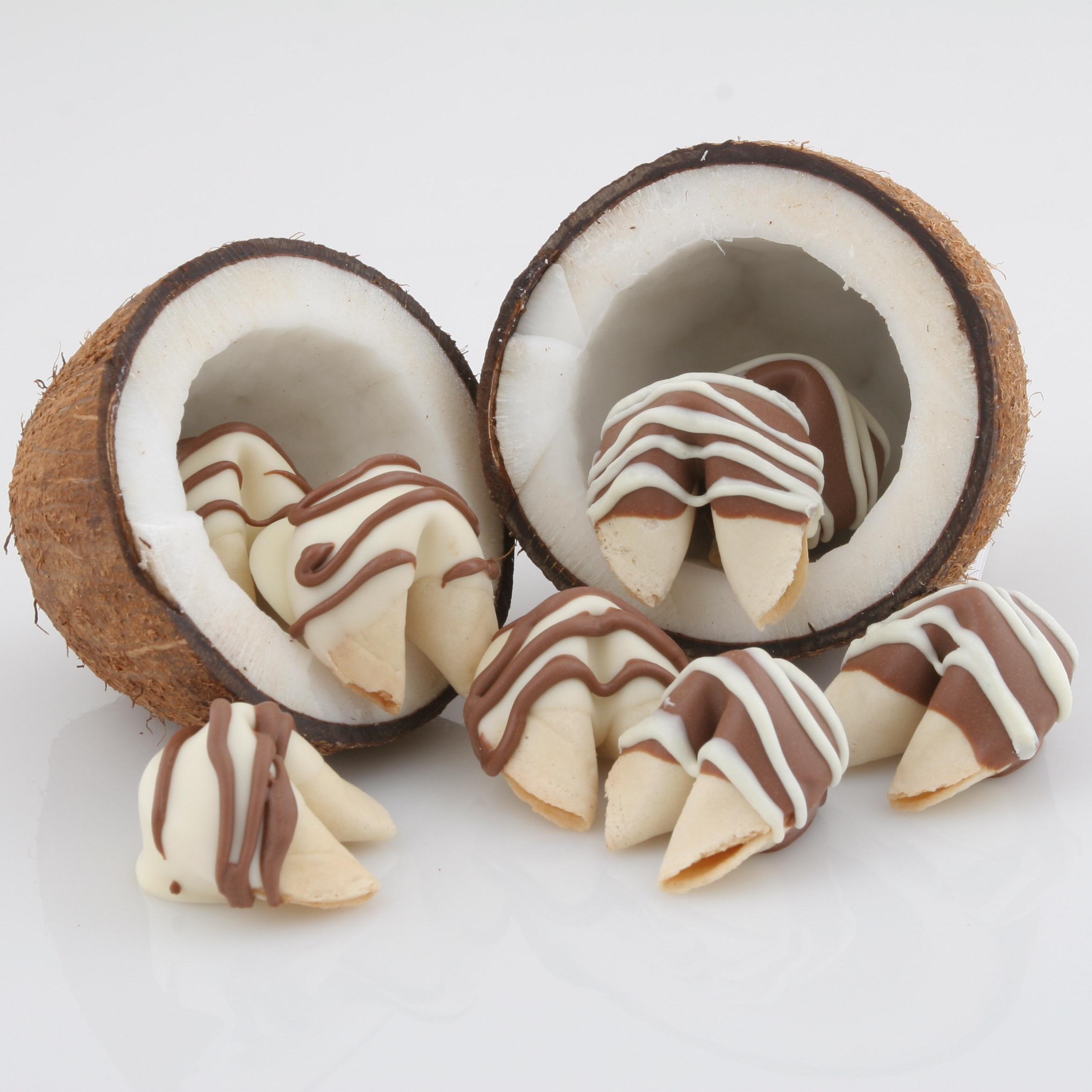
Coconut

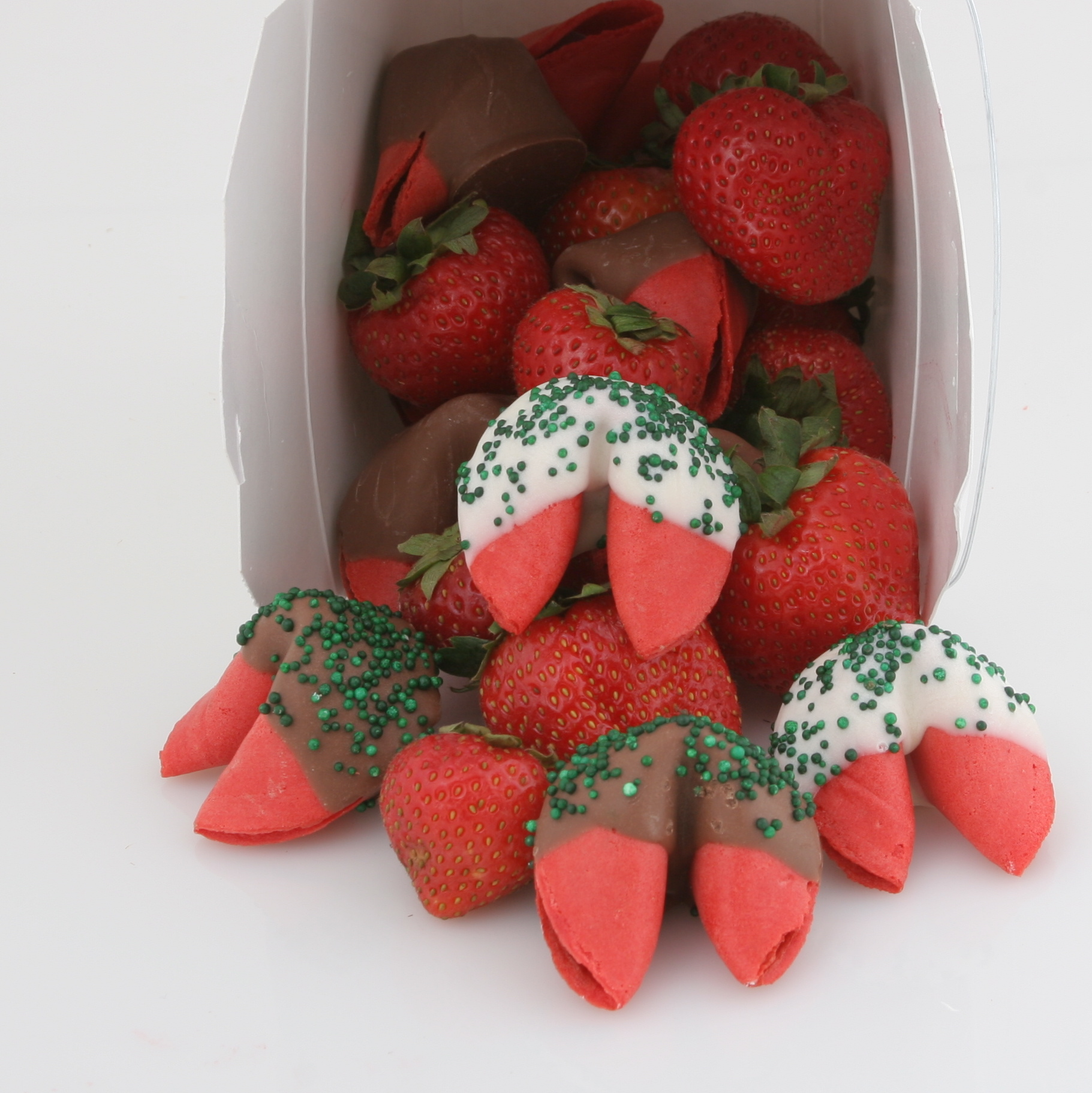
Strawberry

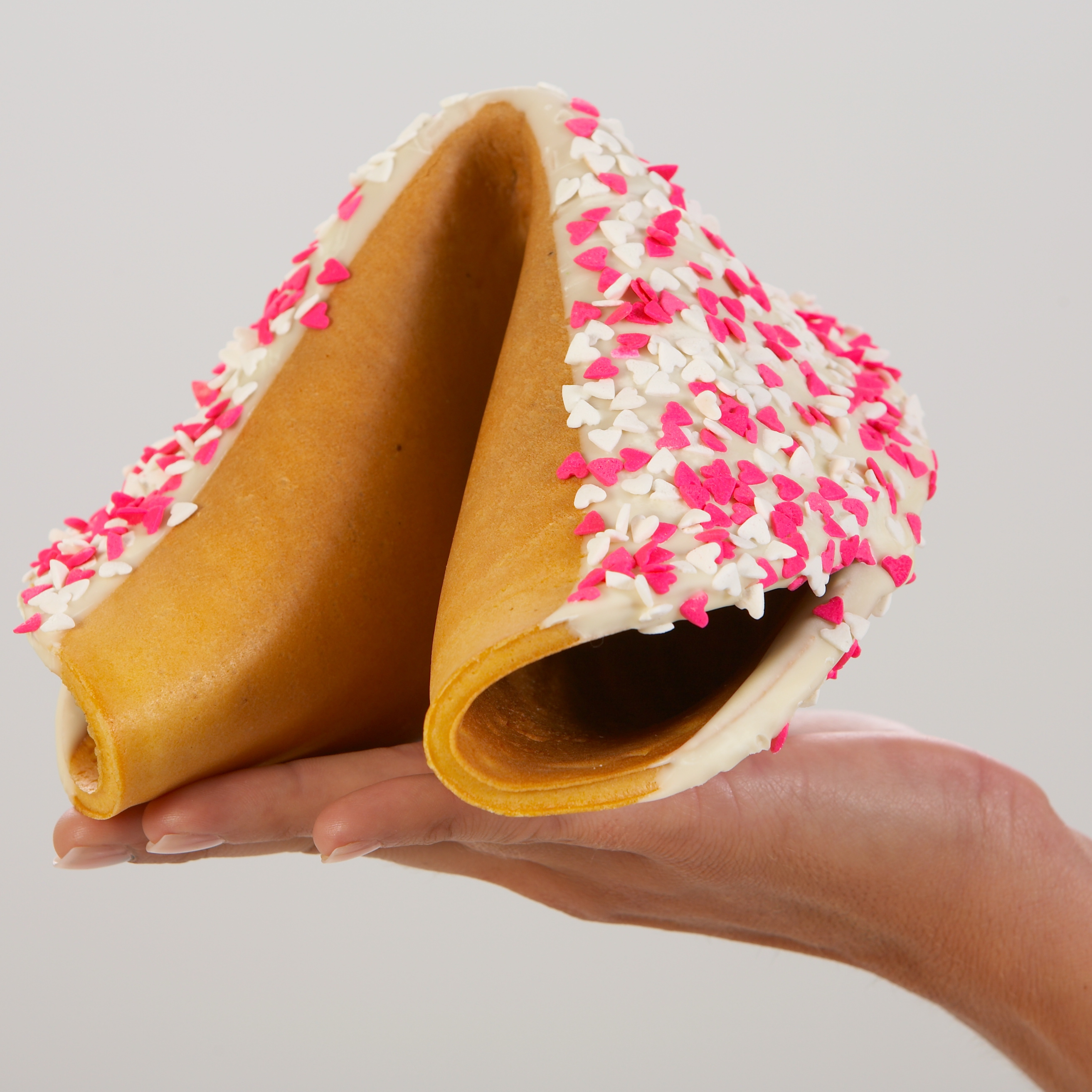
Giant Fortune Cookie

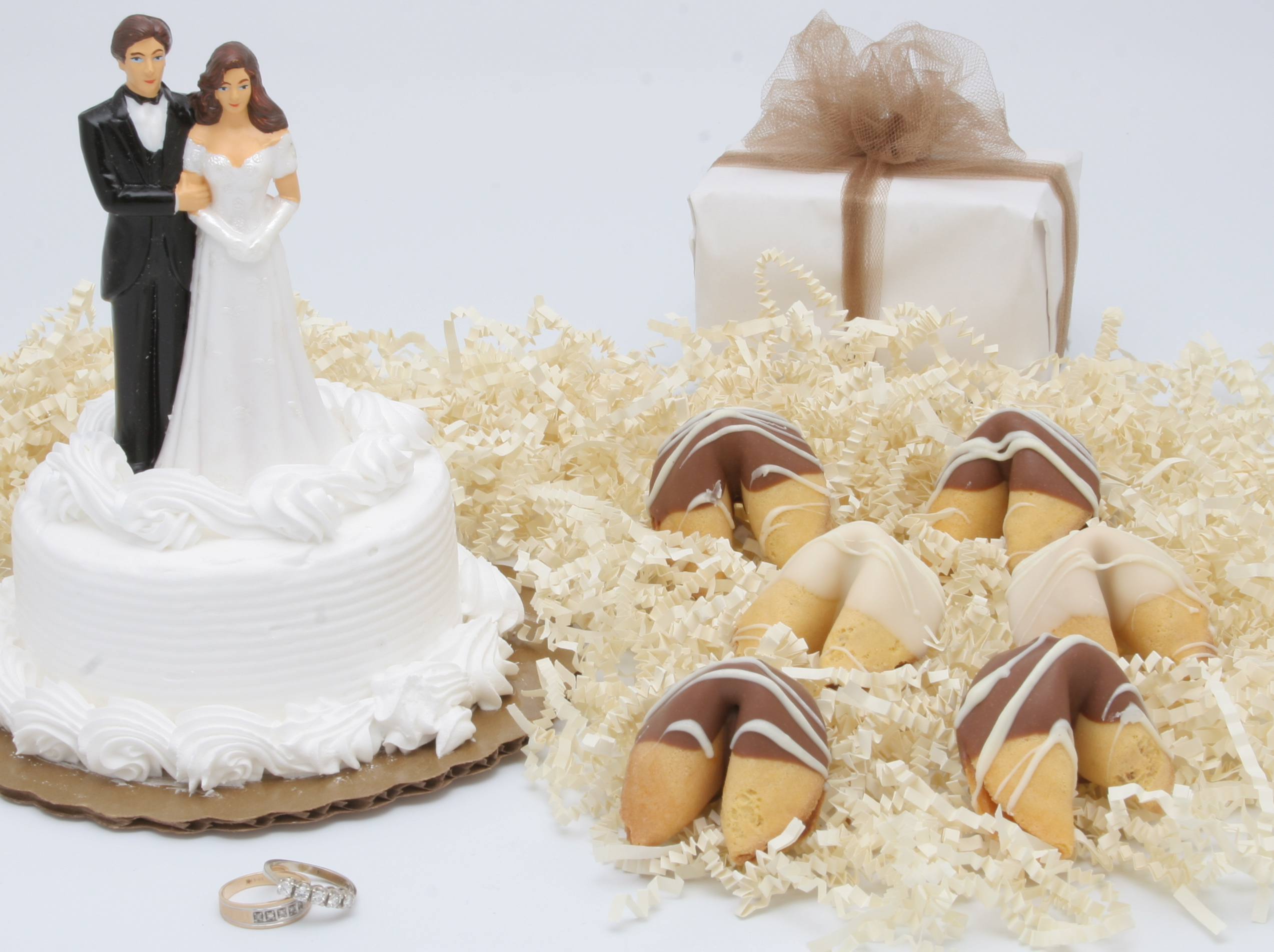
As wedding favors
