= Tsao =

Tsao may refer to:

- Ts'ao (the apostrophe is often omitted), the Wade–Giles romanization of the Chinese surname Cao
- Tsao, Botswana, village

== See also ==
- Tsou people
- General Tso's chicken
- General Tsao (disambiguation)
- General Tso (disambiguation)
- Conversations with Tsao
