= Rooster (application) =

Rooster is a mobile reading service for iOS7.

== Features ==
For a $4.99 monthly fee, Rooster releases fiction installments to users' phones. Each set of selections comprises one classic and one contemporary novel or novella. Each installment is also optimized towards the average, fifteen-minute commute. The works can be as long as 500 pages, though the app is also intended as a possible "gateway drug" to works that might require more time than a month of commutes. Users can customize how often and at what time their installment will arrive, as well as text size, font style, and background color. The amount of content is also adjustable, as users can skip to later installments if they choose. Over the course of each month, up to two more books will appear in the app.

== Development ==
Rooster was created by Jennifer 8. Lee, Yael Goldstein Love, and former StumbleUpon engineer Jacqueline Chang, co-founders of Plympton, Inc. Serial fiction has always been Plympton's core product, as well as that of now-partner DailyLit, but past series were distributed via Kindle or email. The idea to focus on the iPhone came after Goldstein Love continued hearing people complain they "don't have time to read anything longer than a blog post," even though books like Madame Bovary and Great Expectations were once serials in short installments. The name for the program came out of the associations between the bird and early-morning wakefulness. Rooster's release was announced at SXSW Interactive. It was launched March 10, 2014, in the Apple App Store. Its inaugural literary selections were Herman Melville's Billy Budd and "I Was Here," an exclusive. Though it currently focuses on fiction, co-founders hope it will expand to other genres.

== Reception ==
Inc. listed it as one of "5 Game-Changing Startups to Watch."
