= Peng Chang-kuei =

Chef known for Hunan cuisine

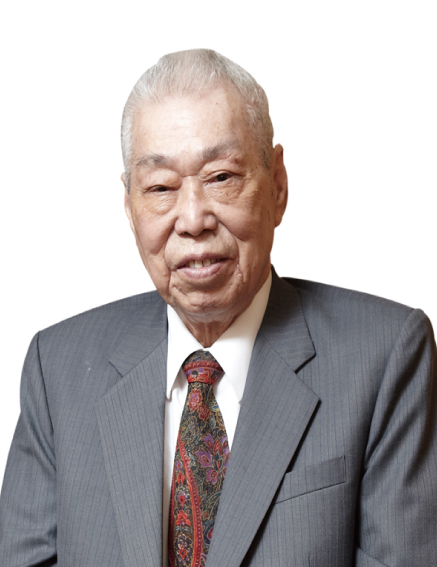
- Born: September 26, 1919; Shaping-xiang, Changsha County, Hunan province, Republic of China
- Died: November 30, 2016 (aged 97); Taipei, Taiwan
- Occupation: Chef of Hunan cuisine

Peng Chang-kuei
- Traditional Chinese: 彭長貴
- Simplified Chinese: 彭长贵
Transcriptions

Peng Chang-kuei (彭長貴, Xiang Chinese: [pən˩˧ tʂan˩˧ kwej˥]; September 26, 1919 – November 30, 2016) was a chef specializing in Hunan cuisine. Throughout his culinary career, he was based in Hengyang, Chongqing, Taipei and New York City. He is credited with creating General Tso's chicken.

== Early career ==
Peng was born on September 26, 1919, in Shaping-xiang, Changsha County, Hunan Province, Republic of China.

In 1933, Peng became the apprentice of Cao Jinchen (曹藎臣), the fourth-in-line personal chef of the late Tan Yankai, a Hunan statesman and the former Premier of the Republic of China. Peng followed Cao Jinchen to Hengyang, Hunan, when Cao found his own restaurant Yuloudong (玉樓東).

Following the 1938 Changsha fire, Peng and his family moved to Guiyang and finally to Chongqing, the wartime capital. His father and elder brother died on the way. While working in the Hunan restaurant Xiaoxiang Jiudian (瀟湘酒店) in Chongqing, he was offered to be the personal chef of Zeng Guangshan. Zeng, then in her 80s, was a native of Hunan and the granddaughter of Zeng Guofan, the commander of the Xiang Army and the mother of Lt. General Yu Ta-wei, the head of the Department of Weapons of the Ministry of War. He was well connected to the senior figures of the Nationalist government while in Chongqing. He cofounded Banyating (半雅亭) restaurant in Chongqing.

After the Second Sino-Japanese War, he returned to Changsha. He was married for the first time (he remarried twice in Taiwan). Before the communist takeover of Hunan in September 1949, he parted ways with his mother, wife, and children to follow the Kuomintang's retreat to Taiwan.

== Career in Taiwan and New York ==
In 1952, Peng found the Hunan restaurant Yuloudong (玉樓東) in Taipei, but it was destroyed by fire a few years later. In 1955, he was in charge of the staff restaurant of the Overseas Community Affairs Council of the Republic of China. In 1956, he found two restaurants in Taipei, Tianchanglou (天長樓) and Peng Yuan (彭園). In 1959, he was in charge of the staff restaurant of the Central Bank of the Republic of China. In the 1960s, he cofounded the restaurant Dung Wan Gok (Cantonese: 東雲閣) in Hong Kong, but it was destroyed in a fire five days before its opening.

Peng emigrated to New York City in 1973 and opened his own restaurant, Uncle Peng's Hunan Yuan, near the Headquarters of the United Nations. General Tso's chicken featured in his New York restaurant. He returned to Taiwan in the 1980s to open a chain of Peng Yuan restaurants, later opening a branch in his hometown of Changsha. In 2017 four branches of the original restaurant were in operation as well as additional restaurants under a brand called Xiang Ba Lao targeted at a younger demographic. The restaurants use local chickens raised by small farmers (tuji chicken) rather than cheaper imported meat.

== General Tso's Chicken ==
In 2008, Peng was interviewed by Jennifer 8. Lee for the documentary The Search for General Tso (2014). In the documentary, Peng recalled in 1952 he was invited by the Republic of China Navy to be in charge of a three-day state banquet during Admiral Arthur W. Radford's visit of Taiwan. Peng claimed Tso's chicken was served on Radford's menu on the third day. According to U.S. diplomatic records, Radford's visit was during June 2–6, 1953. An alternative story proposed by Taiwanese food writer Zhu Zhenfan (2009) claimed Chiang Ching-kuo, the son of President Chiang Kai-shek, paid a late visit to Peng's restaurant when Peng ran out of ingredients. Chiang was served an improvised dish, General Tso's chicken, by Peng.

The earliest news account on Peng was on November 13, 1968, and 15-24 January 1969 under the identical news heading "彭長貴的故事", published by Economic Daily News (經濟日報) in Taipei. It is not clear whether his stories about his invention of the Tso's chicken were featured in those 1968-1969 news report.

== Personal life ==
Peng was married twice. His first was in Taiwan in 1950 during which he had a son (b. 1953) but divorced shortly after. His married a second time in 1961 and had a son and a daughter. There are claims he had seven children. Peng died from pneumonia in Taipei, Taiwan in November 2016.
