= General Tao =

General Tao may refer to:

- Tao Jun (Three Kingdoms), general of Eastern Wu during the Three Kingdoms period of Chinese history
- Tao Kan (259–334), Jin dynasty Chinese general and governor
- Tao Qian (Han dynasty) (132–194), late Han dynasty Chinese warlord
- Tao Pai Pai, human character in the Dragon Ball anime and manga series known as General Tao in some adaptions

== See also ==
- General Tso (disambiguation)
- General Tso's chicken, sweet and spicy deep-fried chicken dish also known as "General Tao's chicken"
- Zuo Zongtang (1812–1885), Qing dynasty Chinese general for whom the chicken dish is named
