= Gigi Danziger =

American entrepreneur, investor and philanthropist

Gigi Danziger (formerly Susan Danziger) is an American entrepreneur, investor, and philanthropist. She is best known as the founder of the video technology company Ziggeo (acquired by Kargo in 2022), the literary platform DailyLit, and for co-founding The Spark of Hudson and Hudson’s HudsonUP, one of the first universal basic income pilot programs in a small U.S. city. Her work spans technology, publishing, social innovation, and regenerative agriculture.

== Early life and education ==
Danziger earned a Bachelor of Arts in Art history from Cornell University and a Juris Doctor from New York University School of Law.

== Career ==
=== DailyLit ===
In 2006, Danziger co-founded DailyLit, a digital publishing platform that delivered books in serialized installments via email and RSS. DailyLit was part of an early wave of serialized reading platforms and was later acquired by Plympton, Inc., with Danziger continuing as an advisor.

=== Ziggeo ===
In 2013, Danziger founded Ziggeo, a New York–based video technology company providing asynchronous video recording and playback tools for businesses. Under her leadership as CEO, Ziggeo won multiple industry awards including "Best Video API" at API World and "Best in Show" at NY Tech Day. The company was acquired by Kargo in 2022.

=== Eutopia Holdings ===
Danziger founded Eutopia Holdings, a venture vehicle supporting climate, social impact, and early-stage founders from underrepresented backgrounds.

== Social innovation ==
=== The Spark of Hudson and HudsonUP ===
In 2017, Danziger and her husband Albert Wenger launched The Spark of Hudson, a community learning center in Hudson. In 2020, they co-founded HudsonUP, a UBI pilot program providing monthly stipends to a group of residents in partnership with the Humanity Forward Foundation. The program received national media attention as part of the broader movement testing UBI in U.S. communities.

=== Wally Farms ===
In 2018, Danziger co-founded Wally Farms, a 600-acre regenerative agriculture and climate innovation hub in Columbia County, New York. The farm is designed as a living laboratory for sustainable food production and land stewardship initiatives.

== Board memberships and affiliations ==
Danziger serves on the board of the Humanity Forward Foundation. She is a Fellow of the Royal Society of Arts and serves on the Cornell Advisory Council for Entrepreneurship.

== Recognition ==
- Named one of the “76 Women of Influence” by the New York Business Journal (2016)
- Winner of the SmartCEO Brava Award (2016)
- Honoree on the Forty Over 40 list (2015)

== Personal life ==
Danziger is married to Albert Wenger, a partner at Union Square Ventures. Together they have launched several ventures in technology and community innovation. In 2023, she publicly announced that she had changed her name from Susan to Gigi.
