= Sheldon Goldstein =

American theoretical physicist

Sheldon Goldstein (born October 24, 1947, in Augusta, Georgia) is an American theoretical physicist. He introduced the term "Bohmian mechanics".

== Biography ==
Goldstein graduated from Yeshiva University with a B.A. in 1969, a B.S. in 1971, and a Ph.D. in physics in 1973. His Ph.D. thesis, supervised by Joel Lebowitz, is entitled Ergodic Theory and Infinite Systems Since 1977 Goldstein has been a professor at Rutgers University. His research deals with the foundations of quantum mechanics and, especially, theoretical developments of De Broglie–Bohm theory. His collaborators include Joel Lebowitz and Detlef Dürr. In a 1981 paper, Goldstein and Oliver Penrose described a new method of defining nonequilibrium entropy in statistical mechanics. Goldstein contributed the article Bohmian Mechanics to the Stanford Encyclopedia of Philosophy.

For two academic years from 1973 to 1975, Goldstein was at the Institute for Advanced Study. He is a Fellow of the American Association for the Advancement of Science. He is a member of the board of governors of the John Bell Institute for the Foundations of Physics (founded by Tim Maudlin).

Sheldon Goldstein and Rebecca Newberger Goldstein, a novelist and philosopher, were married from 1969 to 1999, until they divorced. They are the parents of the novelist Yael Goldstein Love and the poet Danielle Blau.

== Selected publications ==
- Goldstein, Sheldon (1980). "Remarks on the global Markov property". Communications in Mathematical Physics. 74 (3): 223–234. Bibcode:1980CMaPh..74..223G. doi:10.1007/BF01952887. S2CID 119956310.
- De Masi, A.; Ferrari, P. A.; Goldstein, S.; Wick, W. D. (1989). "An invariance principle for reversible Markov processes. Applications to random motions in random environments". Journal of Statistical Physics. 55 (3–4): 787–855. Bibcode:1989JSP....55..787D. doi:10.1007/BF01041608. S2CID 7114282.
- Berndl, K.; Daumer, M.; Dürr, D.; Goldstein, S.; Zanghì, N. (1995). "A survey of Bohmian mechanics". Il Nuovo Cimento B. 110 (5–6): 737–750. arXiv:quant-ph/9504010. Bibcode:1995NCimB.110..737B. doi:10.1007/BF02741477. S2CID 119340618.
- Goldstein, Sheldon (1996). "Bohmian Mechanics and the Quantum Revolution". Synthese. 107 (1): 145–165. arXiv:quant-ph/9512027. doi:10.1007/BF00413904. JSTOR 20117507. S2CID 44120976.
- Berndl, Karin; Dürr, Detlef; Goldstein, Sheldon; Zanghì, Nino (1996). "Nonlocality, Lorentz invariance, and Bohmian quantum theory". Physical Review A. 53 (4): 2062–2073. arXiv:quant-ph/9510027. Bibcode:1996PhRvA..53.2062B. doi:10.1103/PhysRevA.53.2062. PMID 9913109. S2CID 7576353.
- Goldstein, Sheldon (1998). "Quantum Theory without Observers—Part Two". Physics Today. 51 (4): 38–42. Bibcode:1998PhT....51d..38G. doi:10.1063/1.882241.
- Van Kampen, Nico G.; DeWitt, Bryce; Goldstein, Sheldon; Bricmont, Jean; Griffiths, Robert B.; Omnès, Roland (2000). "Quantum Histories, Mysteries, and Measurements". Physics Today. 53 (5): 76–83. Bibcode:2000PhT....53e..76V. doi:10.1063/1.883089. (4 letters independently written by 4 different authors with a reply from Griffiths and Omnès)
- Dürr, Detlef; Goldstein, Sheldon; Tumulka, Roderich; Zanghì, Nino (2005). "Bell-type quantum field theories". Journal of Physics A: Mathematical and General. 38 (4): R1–R43. arXiv:quant-ph/0407116. doi:10.1088/0305-4470/38/4/R01. S2CID 15547226.
- Goldstein, Sheldon (2010). "Bohmian Mechanics and Quantum Information". Foundations of Physics. 40 (4): 335–355. arXiv:0907.2427. Bibcode:2010FoPh...40..335G. doi:10.1007/s10701-009-9319-4. S2CID 5670604.
- Cushing, J. T.; Fine, Arthur; Goldstein, S. (April 17, 2013). Bohmian Mechanics and Quantum Theory: An Appraisal. Springer. ISBN 9789401587150.
- Dürr, Detlef; Goldstein, Sheldon; Norsen, Travis; Struyve, Ward; Zanghì, Nino (2014). "Can Bohmian mechanics be made relativistic?". Proceedings of the Royal Society A: Mathematical, Physical and Engineering Sciences. 470 (2162). doi:10.1098/rspa.2013.0699. PMC 3896068. PMID 24511259.
- Goldstein, Sheldon; Zanghì, Nino (2022). "Remarks About the Relationship Between Relational Physics and a Large Kantian Component of the Laws of Nature". Rethinking the Concept of Law of Nature. Jerusalem Studies in Philosophy and History of Science. pp. 225–257. arXiv:2111.09609. doi:10.1007/978-3-030-96775-8_9. ISBN 978-3-030-96774-1.
- Dürr, Detlef; Goldstein, Sheldon; Zanghì, Nino (November 6, 2012). Quantum Physics Without Quantum Philosophy. Springer. ISBN 9783642306907.
- Bassi, Angelo; Goldstein, Sheldon; Tumulka, Roderich; Zanghì, Nino (eds.). Physics and the Nature of Reality: Essays in Memory of Detlev Dürr. Fundamental Theories of Physics Book 215. Springer. ISBN 978-3031454332; release date February 5, 2024
