= Mike L. Fry =

American entrepreneur

Mike Fry
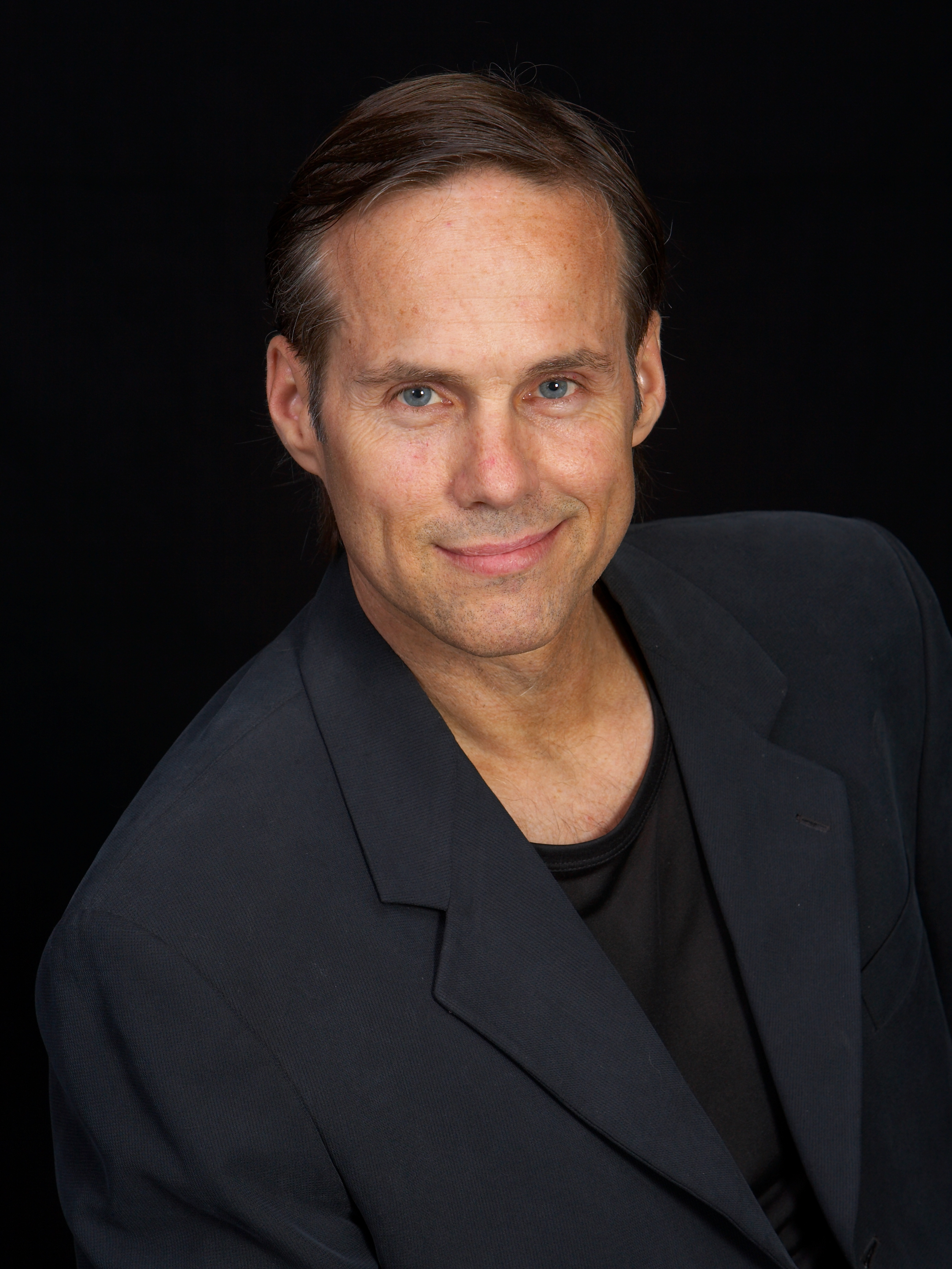
- Born: October 25, 1960; Watseka, Illinois
- Died: November 4, 2012 (aged 52); Indianapolis, Indiana
- Occupation(s): Entrepreneur, Trainer, Entertainer, Marketing expert
- Website: mikefrylive.com

Michael L. "Mike" Fry (October 25, 1960 – November 4, 2012) was an American serial entrepreneur, entertainer, trainer and marketing expert. He was the original Happy the Hobo on the children's television series Happy's Place, and the creative mind behind and owner of Fancy Fortune Cookies.

== Entertainer ==
Mike Fry was born in Watseka, Illinois but grew up in the Huntington, Indiana area. He was the state Tae Kwon Do champion in 1979. He began juggling at the age of fourteen, after finding out that his grandfather used to juggle dirt clods on the farm in rural Illinois. By the age of 17 he was juggling for audiences in the local area.

Fry was accepted to the Ringling Brothers and Barnum & Bailey Clown College, in Venice, Florida at the age of 19, graduating in 1981. He toured with the circus for the 1981 and 1982 season. He had the honor of being trained by three of the world's four Master Clowns: Lou Jacobs, Frosty Little, and Bobby Kay. He trained in heavy object balancing, which included six-foot tables, small canoes, a twenty-five foot ladder, a running chainsaw, other people, sofas, and a television set. In 1981, he became a Guinness Book of World Records record holder as part of a group that juggled the most objects at one time.

He left Ringling Brothers in 1982 and made the transition to television, where he wrote and co-produced Happy's Place, one of America's highest-rated children's television shows, from 1982 to 1990. Happy's Place aired on Fox affiliate WFFT-TV in 207 cities for eight years. At the height of the show's popularity there was a two-year wait for tickets to the show. He hosted a variety of guests from The Harlem Globetrotters to Jerry Mathers and Tiny Tim.

After leaving Happy's Place, Fry trained at The Second City sketch comedy group in Chicago. While in Chicago he also auditioned to play the role of Bozo the Clown, and did some writing for the show as a result. He was also an instructor at the Illinois Juggling Institute for one year while he lived in Chicago.

== Inventor ==
During his role as Happy the Hobo, Fry became interested in inventing. In 1988 he started marketing his first viable invention, America's first gourmet flavored fortune cookies. Since 1988 the company has greatly expanded on his original concept of gourmet fortune cookies, specializing in flavored, chocolate-dipped, giant, and decorated fortune cookies.

In 1990 Fry started developing and marketing another of his inventions, the "Always There Bear". He spent twelve years developing, marketing and refining the idea, culminating in his invention being purchased by Hasbro toys in 2002. His story is featured in the book The One Minute Millionaire, by Mark Victor Hansen and Robert Allen. Fry worked with both Mark and Robert on the deal with Hasbro.

His products have been used by Donald Trump, Ozzy Osbourne, Jay Leno, Conan O'Brien, Steven Spielberg and many other noted celebrities.

== Trainer ==
In 2004 Fry joined up with his long-time friend and mentor Linda Chandler as a part of her Core Value Training Program. He used his experiences as a marketer, entrepreneur and entertainer to teach internet marketing strategies to thousands of international business owners.

== Other works ==
Prior to his death, Fry was working on publishing his own children's joke book, using jokes from his live kids' show. He had collected kids' joke books for many years, and he had a huge collection of them. Fry was also working on a book pertaining to goal-setting based around hours of interviews with adventurer and author John Goddard, who greatly influenced Fry to start his own life-list at age 23.

== Death ==
On November 4, 2012 it was announced that Mike Fry had died at the IU Medical Center in Indianapolis. He had suffered from an immune disorder for about 12 months. He was awaiting a liver transplant when he succumbed to the illness.

== Media appearances ==
=== Books ===
- Purple Cow (on-line edition) - Seth Godin: Seth Godin chose Mike Fry's Fancy Fortune Cookies as one of the most unusual niche food companies.
- The One Minute Millionaire - Mark Victor Hansen and Robert Allen: Used Mike Fry's invention and story as the basis for a fictional storyline.
- Wake up and Live the Life You Love - Steven E. and Lee Beard: Featured Mike Fry's inspirational story along with that of Dr. Wayne Dyer, Mark Victor Hansen, and John Assaraf.
- Be Unreasonable - Paul Lemburg: Used Mike Fry's Fancy Fortune Cookies idea as an example of an "unreasonable" breakthrough and innovative business idea.
- Fortune Cookie Chronicles: Featured Fancy Fortune Cookies, and Mike Fry's invention of the gourmet fortune cookie as part of the history of the fortune cookie.

=== Magazines ===
- Indiana Business Magazine: "It's No Secret: Four important business trends revealed in Indiana's Growth 100 companies"

=== Newspapers ===
- 1988 Herald Press "Seeking a cookie fortune."
- 1993 New York Newsday "Clowning Around With Cookies."
- 2002 Denver Daily News "Some people can't give up the fortunes."
- 2007 Fort Wayne Journal Gazette "Wise Crackers: Hoosier inventor adds flavor buffet to fortune cookies."
- 2007 Indianapolis Business Journal "Finding his fortune"

=== Television ===
- QVC: Fry appeared along with his Fancy Fortune Cookies on the show, sold out in less than three minutes.
