= General Tso =

General Tso may refer to:

- Zuo Zongtang, formerly spelt Tso Tsung-t'ang (1812–1885), Qing Dynasty military leader who suppressed the 1862–1877 Dungan Revolt
- Tso Shih-hai (1870s–1945), Qing Dynasty, Republic of China, and Mengjiang general and official in Inner Mongolia
- General Tso's chicken, dish popular in American Chinese restaurants, believed to be named for Zuo Zongtang

== See also ==
- General Tao (disambiguation)
- General Tsao (disambiguation)
