= Rebecca Goldstein =

American philosopher and novelist (born 1950)

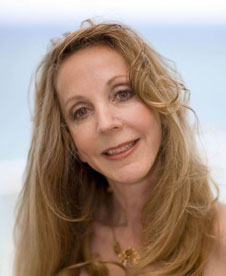
- Born: Rebecca Newberger; February 23, 1950 (age 76); White Plains, New York, U.S.
- Spouses: Sheldon Goldstein (m. 1969; div. 1999); Steven Pinker (m. 2007)
- Children: Yael Goldstein Love (novelist); Danielle Blau (poet)

Education
- Education: Barnard College (BA); Princeton University (PhD)

Philosophical work
- Institutions: Columbia University; Rutgers University; Trinity College; Harvard University; New York University

Rebecca Goldstein (née Newberger; born February 23, 1950) is an American philosopher and novelist. She has written eleven books, both fiction and nonfiction. She holds a Ph.D. in philosophy of science from Princeton University, and is sometimes grouped with novelists such as Richard Powers and Alan Lightman, who create fiction that is knowledgeable of, and sympathetic toward, science.

In her four nonfiction works, she has shown an affinity for philosophical rationalism, as well as a conviction that philosophy, like science, makes progress, and that scientific progress is itself supported by philosophical arguments.

Increasingly, in her talks and interviews, she has been exploring what she has called "mattering theory" as an alternative to traditional utilitarianism. This theory is a continuation of her idea of "the mattering map", first suggested in her novel The Mind–Body Problem. The concept of the mattering map has been widely adopted in contexts as diverse as cultural criticism, psychology, and behavioral economics.

Goldstein is a MacArthur Fellow, and has received the National Humanities Medal and the National Jewish Book Award.

== Early life and education ==
Rebecca Newberger was born in an Orthodox Jewish family, and grew up in White Plains, New York. She has one older brother, who is an Orthodox rabbi, and a younger sister, Sarah Stern. An older sister, Mynda Barenholtz, died in 2001. She did her undergraduate work at City College of New York, UCLA, and Barnard College, where she graduated as valedictorian in 1972. After earning her Ph.D. in philosophy from Princeton University, where she studied with Thomas Nagel and wrote a dissertation titled "Reduction, Realism, and the Mind", she returned to Barnard as a professor of philosophy.

== Career ==
In 1983, Goldstein published her first novel, The Mind-Body Problem, a serio-comic tale of the conflict between emotion and intelligence, combined with reflections on the nature of mathematical genius, the challenges faced by intellectual women, and Jewish tradition and identity. Goldstein said she wrote the book to "insert 'real life' intimately into the intellectual struggle. In short, I wanted to write a philosophically motivated novel."

Her second novel, The Late-Summer Passion of a Woman of Mind (1989), was also set in academia. Her third novel, The Dark Sister (1993), was a fictionalization of family and professional issues in the life of William James. She followed it with a short-story collection, Strange Attractors (1993), which was a National Jewish Honor Book and New York Times Notable Book of the Year. A fictional mother, daughter, and granddaughter introduced in two of the stories in that collection became the main characters of Goldstein's next novel, Mazel (1995), which won the National Jewish Book Award and the 1995 Edward Lewis Wallant Award.

A MacArthur Fellowship in 1996 led to the writing of Properties of Light (2000), a ghost story about love, betrayal, and quantum physics. Her most recent novel is 36 Arguments for the Existence of God: A Work of Fiction (2010), which explores ongoing controversies over religion and reason through the tale of a professor of psychology who has written an atheist best-seller, while his life is permeated with secular versions of religious themes. National Public Radio chose it as one of its "five favorite books of 2010", and The Christian Science Monitor named it the best book of fiction of 2010.

Goldstein has written two biographical studies: Incompleteness: The Proof and Paradox of Kurt Gödel (2005); and Betraying Spinoza: The Renegade Jew Who Gave Us Modernity (2006). Betraying Spinoza combined her continuing interest in Jewish ideas, history, and identity with an increasing focus on secularism, humanism, and atheism. Goldstein called the book "the eighth book I'd published, but [the] first in which I took the long-delayed and irrevocable step of integrating my private and public selves". Together with 36 Arguments for the Existence of God: A Work of Fiction, it established her as a prominent figure in the humanist movement, part of a wave of "new new atheists" marked by less divisive rhetoric and a greater representation of women.

In 2014, Goldstein published Plato at the Googleplex: Why Philosophy Won't Go Away, an exploration of the historical roots and contemporary relevance of philosophy.

Goldstein presented her full theory of mattering in The Mattering Instinct: How Our Deepest Longing Drives Us and Divides Us, published in 2026. She rooted the longing to matter in the drive in all living things to resist entropy and persist in its being. Humans, with their highly developed cognitive capacities, rationalize this drive as a sense that they matter, which they project into a sense of what intrinsically matters. They differ in what they sense matters, placing them in different regions of the "mattering map" (the metaphor she introduced in The Mind-Body Problem). The major zones (transcending, socializing, competing, heroic striving) in turn encompass many idiosyncratic criteria for mattering which explain why people are often uncomprehending of what passionately drives others. She illustrated the theory with biographical vignettes of scientists, artists, altruists, and others, ending with proposals for which kinds of mattering may be said to be morally justified. In an essay on the book in The Atlantic, the philosopher John Kaag wrote, "Goldstein offers a vision that is both intellectually resonant and humane, reminding us that the struggle to justify our existence is the very thing that makes our existence matter.”

In addition to Barnard, Goldstein has taught at Columbia, Rutgers, and Trinity College in Hartford, Connecticut, and from 2011 to 2022, she was a visiting professor at the New College of the Humanities in London. In 2016 and 2017, she was a visiting professor in the English and Philosophy departments at New York University. Currently she is a Research Associate in the Department of Psychology at Harvard University.

In 2011, she delivered the Tanner Lectures on Human Values at Yale University, "The Ancient Quarrel: Philosophy and Literature". She serves on the Council on Values of the World Economic Forum, and on the advisory board of the Secular Coalition for America.

Goldstein's writing has also appeared in chapters in a number of edited books, in journals including The Atlantic, The Chronicle of Higher Education, The New York Times Book Review, The New York Review of Books, The New Republic, The Wall Street Journal, Huffington Post, Tikkun, Commentary, and in blog format in The Washington Post's "On Faith" section.

== Personal life ==
Newberger married her first husband, physicist Sheldon Goldstein, in 1969; they divorced in 1999. They have two children: the novelist Yael Goldstein Love and poet Danielle Blau. In a 2006 interview with Luke Ford, Goldstein said:

I lived Orthodox for a long time. My husband was Orthodox. Because I didn't want to be hypocritical with our kids, I kept everything. I was torn like a character in a Russian novel. It lasted through college. I remember leaving a class on mysticism in tears because I had forsaken God. That was probably my last burst of religious passion. Then it went away, and I was a happy little atheist.

In 2007, Goldstein married cognitive psychologist Steven Pinker.

== Awards and fellowships ==
- 2014 National Humanities Medal (presented September 10, 2015, at the White House by President Barack Obama)
- 2014 Richard Dawkins Award
- 2013 Montgomery Fellow, Dartmouth College
- 2013 Moment Magazine Creativity Award
- 2012 Franke Visiting Fellow, Whitney Humanities Center, Yale University
- 2011 Humanist of the Year awarded April 2011 by the American Humanist Association
- 2011 Freethought Heroine awarded October 2011 by the Freedom from Religion Foundation
- 2011 Miller Scholar, Santa Fe Institute
- Best Fiction Book of 2010 ("36 Arguments for the Existence of God: A Work of Fiction"), Christian Science Monitor
- Humanist Laureate, awarded by the International Academy of Humanism, 2008
- Fellow, Radcliffe Institute for Advanced Study at Harvard University, 2006–2007
- Guggenheim Fellow, 2006–2007
- Koret Jewish Book Award in Jewish Thought, 2006, for Betraying Spinoza: The Renegade Jew who Gave Us Modernity
- Fellow of the American Academy of Arts and Sciences, 2005
- MacArthur Fellow, 1996
- National Jewish Book Award, 1995, for Mazel
- Edward Lewis Wallant Award, 1995, for Mazel
- Whiting Award, 1991

== Bibliography ==
=== Fiction ===
- The Mind-Body Problem (1983)
- The Late-Summer Passion of a Woman of Mind (1989)
- The Dark Sister (1993)
- Mazel (1995)
- Properties of Light: A Novel of Love, Betrayal, and Quantum Physics (2000)
- Thirty-Six Arguments for the Existence of God: A Work of Fiction (2010)

Short stories

- Strange Attractors: Stories (1993)

=== Nonfiction ===
- Incompleteness: The Proof and Paradox of Kurt Gödel (2005)
- Betraying Spinoza: The Renegade Jew Who Gave Us Modernity (2006)
- Plato at the Googleplex: Why Philosophy Won't Go Away (2014)
- The Mattering Instinct: How Our Deepest Longing Drives Us and Divides Us (2026)

== See also ==
- American philosophy
- List of American philosophers
- List of novelists from the United States
- Philosophical fiction
