= The Search for General Tso =

2014 American documentary film by Ian Cheney

- Film poster
- Directed by: Ian Cheney
- Produced by: Jennifer 8. Lee; Amanda Murray
- Cinematography: Ian Cheney; Taylor Gentry
- Edited by: Frederick Shanahan
- Music by: Ben Fries; Simon Beins
- Production company: Wicked Delicate Films
- Distributed by: Sundance Selects
- Release date: April 20, 2014 (Tribeca Film Festival)
- Running time: 73 minutes
- Country: United States
- Language: English

The Search for General Tso is a documentary film that premiered at the 2014 Tribeca Film Festival. It was directed by Ian Cheney and produced by Amanda Murray and Jennifer 8. Lee. Sundance Selects acquired it in December 2014, and it was released January 2, 2015, in theaters and on demand.

== Synopsis ==
The film begins by exploring theories about General Tso. It then shifts focus to China, where few recognize the eponymous dish. The film then traces Tso's real-life history in the Qing Dynasty as well as the history of Chinese immigration to the United States. Interviewed are a number of notable figures in Chinese-American cuisine, such as Cecilia Chiang of the Mandarin, a world record-holder for restaurant menus and Chef Peng Chang-kuei, who claims to have invented the dish in Taiwan.

== Development ==
Around 2004, Cheney and his best friend were driving across America when they stopped at a Chinese restaurant "with red booths and neon signs" and ordered General Tso's chicken. The experience prompted them to investigate the history of Chinese food in America.

In 2008, Lee wrote a book about the history of Chinese food in the United States and around the world, titled The Fortune Cookie Chronicles, documenting the process on her blog. She reported the unlikely, but true, story of how a batch of fortune cookies created 110 Powerball lottery winners. To the surprise of many non-Chinese readers, she reported that fortune cookies are found in many countries but not China and that fortune cookies may have originated in Japan. Warner Books editor Jonathan Karp struck a deal with Lee to write a book about "how Chinese food is more all-American than apple pie". She appeared on The Colbert Report to promote the book. The book was #26 on The New York Times Best Seller list.

The book research is the basis of Lee's documentary collaboration with Cheney. In addition to premiering at Tribeca, the film played at the Seattle International Film Festival AFI Docs, and the Independent Film Festival of Boston.

== Critical reception ==
Film reviews were generally positive, with critics finding the premise amusing and the conclusion thought-provoking. Scott Foundas of Variety called it "a finger-lickin' good foodie docu" and John DeFore of The Hollywood Reporter predicted, "Festival auds should eat it up."
