= Ziggeo =

Ziggeo Inc
- Company type: Private
- Website type: Video Streaming
- Headquarters: New York City, New York
- Founders: Gigi Danziger (formerly Susan Danziger); Oliver Friedmann
- Website: ziggeo.com
- Launched: 2013

Ziggeo is a cloud-based video technology SaaS (software as a service) company that provides asynchronous video APIs, mobile SDKs and tools to deliver enterprise-grade WebRTC capabilities.

Ziggeo is the initiator and backer of BetaJS, an open-source framework. It also launched Video Hack Day. Ziggeo is headquartered in New York City.

== History ==
Ziggeo was founded by Gigi Danziger (formerly Susan Danziger) Danziger and Oliver Friedmann in 2013. It launched the same year as a recruitment platform, and then pivoted in 2014 to a general video recording API provider that supports a variety of use cases and partners. Ziggeo is backed by Albert Wenger of Union Square Ventures.

Ziggeo's API for Video Recording and Playback won the API: World Award for its Music/Video API in 2016 and 2017. Ziggeo was a finalist for the SaaS Award in HR / Recruitment and was a finalist for the SAAS Award in Non-Profits / Education in 2017.

In August 2022, Ziggeo was acquired by Kargo, an ad-tech firm, for an undisclosed sum.
