= Plympton, Inc. =

Literary studio

- Parent company: Plympton, Inc.
- Founded: 2011
- Founder: Jennifer 8. Lee and Yael Goldstein Love
- Country of origin: United States
- Headquarters location: Boston, San Francisco
- Official website: www.plympton.com

Plympton Inc. is a literary studio founded in 2011 by Jennifer 8. Lee and Yael Goldstein Love. Plympton focuses on publishing serialized fiction for digital platforms, and launched its first series in September 2012 as part of the Kindle Serials program announced by Jeff Bezos.

Of those original series, the installments were divided into installments of between 8,000 and 25,000 words, and were distributed digitally via e-book reader. New installments were automatically updated on readers' devices.

At the 2013 TOC Conference, Plympton announced its new partnership with DailyLit, a leading online publisher and distributor of serialized books through short e-mail installments. DailyLit founders Gigi Danziger (formerly Susan Danziger) and Albert Wenger became investors and advisors for the newly merged company.

Plympton revamped the DailyLit website in November 2013. It is now working with authors like National Book Award winner Julia Glass and Pulitzer Prize finalist Adam Haslett. Through DailyLit, Plympton also co-created a project called Recovering the Classics, which crowdsourced covers for books in the public domain.

In March 2014, Plympton launched Rooster, a mobile reading service for iOS7.
