= General Tsao =

General Tsao may refer to:

Historical generals with the name spelled Ts'ao^{2} in Wade–Giles romanisation (Cáo in Pinyin, 曹 in Chinese characters), often simplified to Tsao in non-specialist works:

- Generals under Ts'ao Ts'ao (Cao Cao) in the late Han dynasty:
  - Ts'ao Ch'un (d. 210), cavalry general
  - Ts'ao Chen (d. 231)
  - Ts'ao Jen (168–223)
- Ts'ao Ch'in (d. 1461), Ming dynasty general who staged the Rebellion of Ts'ao Ch'in (Cao Qin)
- Ts'ao Hsing (fl. 196), late Han dynasty general under Lü Pu (Lü Bu)
- Ts'ao Kun (1862–1938), general in the Beiyang Army under Yuan Shikai in the Republic of China's Warlord era

Fictional characters:

- General Tsao (Sly Cooper), character in Sly Cooper video game series
- General Tsao, character in 1986 Hong Kong film Peking Opera Blues

== See also ==
- General Tso (disambiguation)
- Tsao (disambiguation)
