= Yael Goldstein Love =

American novelist

- Born: 1978 (age 47–48)
- Education: Harvard University (BA)
- Occupations: Novelist; editor; book critic
- Parent(s): Sheldon Goldstein; Rebecca Goldstein

Yael Goldstein Love (born 1978) is an American novelist, editor and book critic. She is also co-founder and editorial director of the literary studio Plympton.

== Biography ==
Goldstein Love was born in 1978 to mathematical physicist Sheldon Goldstein and novelist and philosopher Rebecca Goldstein. Her parents later divorced. Goldstein Love graduated from Harvard College with a degree in philosophy.

In 2007, Goldstein Love published the novel The Passion of Tasha Darsky, originally titled Overture. The novel was the contentious relationship between mother and daughter musicians, leading to speculation about whether the novel was autobiographical. Goldstein Love denied the speculation.

In 2011, Goldstein Love and fellow writer Jennifer 8. Lee founded a literary studio named Plympton, Inc. The studio focuses on publishing serialized fiction for digital platforms. Its first series launched in September 2012 as part of the Kindle Serials program. It also launched the app Rooster, a mobile reading service for iOS7, in March 2014.

The Possiblities came out on Random House in 2023.
