= DailyLit =

- Status: Acquired by Plympton, Inc.
- Founded: 2006
- Founder: Gigi Danziger (formerly Susan Danziger) and Albert Wenger
- Country of origin: United States
- Headquarters location: Mamaroneck, NY
- Official website: www.dailylit.com

DailyLit was an online publisher founded in 2006 by Gigi Danziger (formerly Susan Danziger) and Albert Wenger. The site distributed stories in serial installments via e-mail and RSS feed which were designed to be read in under five minutes. At the O'Rielly Tools of Change for Publishing (TOC) Conference in 2013, it was announced that the company would be acquired by Plympton, a literary studio that publishes serialized fiction for digital platforms. DailyLit's founders continued after the acquisition as advisors.
