= Shun Lee Palace =

Restaurant in New York City

Coordinates: 40°45′33.8″N 73°58′8.8″W

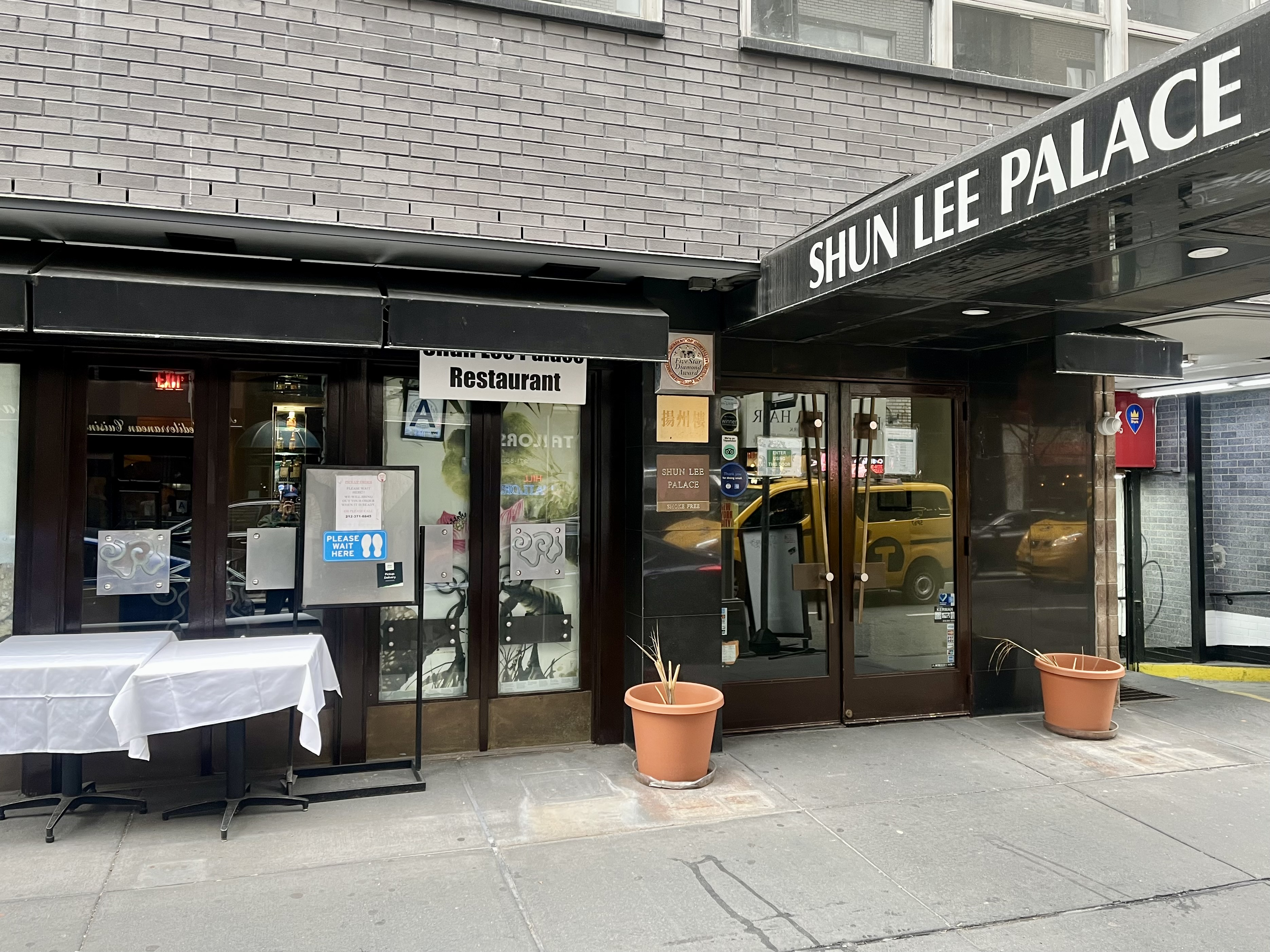
- The restaurant's exterior in 2025
- Interactive map of Shun Lee Palace

Restaurant information
- Established: 1965
- Location: 155 East 55th Street, between Lexington Avenue and Third Avenue in Midtown Manhattan, New York City, New York, 10022

Shun Lee Palace is a Chinese restaurant located at 155 East 55th Street, between Lexington Avenue and Third Avenue in Midtown Manhattan in New York City. It claims to be the birthplace of orange beef. It opened in 1971. One year later, Shun Lee Palace's master chef T.T. Wang and partner Michael Tong opened Hunan Restaurant at 845 Second Avenue, the first Hunan restaurant in the country, paving the road for others.

General Tso's chicken, crisp sea bass Hunan style and crisp orange flavored beef are all attributed to chef Wang at Hunan Restaurant.

In a 2003 interview, proprietor Michael Tong estimated that 70% of his clientele is Jewish and that he goes out of his way to accommodate them – including being open on Christmas and catering to kosher customers.

== Locations ==
They have a second location on the Upper West Side, across from Lincoln Center. Shun Lee (opened in 1981) is located at 43 West 65th Street, between Columbus Avenue and Central Park West. A smaller and less expensive annex to Shun Lee West is Shun Lee Café, specializing in Dim Sum.

The original Shun Lee Dynasty opened at 900 Second Avenue at 48th Street in 1965. The chef was Wang Ching-Ting, who was discovered by a Chinese ambassador and later came to the US as a cook at the Chinese Embassy in Washington, DC. The restaurant interior was designed by mid-century designer Russel Wright, who designed every element of the restaurant including the china, which was produced by Sterling China Company as their Polynesian pattern.

== See also ==
- List of Chinese restaurants
- List of restaurants in New York City
