= The Fortune Cookie Chronicles =

2008 book by Jennifer 8. Lee

The Fortune Cookie Chronicles: Adventures in the World of Chinese Food is a 2008 non-fiction book by Jennifer 8. Lee, published by Hachette/Twelve. It discusses the significance of Chinese American cuisine.

Publishers Weekly described the book as a "travellike narrative". The work discusses the sheer prevalence of American Chinese restaurants, and the genesis of said cuisine. Lee also describes how the cuisine is fundamental in American culture.

== Background ==
Lee traveled to East Asia to do research. She, in a 16-day period, went to Mainland China and Hong Kong as well as Taiwan. Between the three areas she traveled to 16 different cities.

== Contents ==
The chapter "Open-Source Chinese Restaurants" compares the cuisine to open source software as restaurants shared recipes.

The book discusses origins of particular Chinese food items, and it also discusses human trafficking involved in the restaurant trade.

The bibliography has five pages. Mark Knoblauch of Booklist described the bibliography as "Extensive".

== Reception ==
Leslie Cauley of USA Today described the book as a "sweet treat"; she stated sometimes there was excess "mind-numbing crush of details"

Jacqueline M. Newman, editor of Flavor and Fortune, praised the extensive research and described the work as "a fine chow down". Newman stated that she wished that the author had cited some articles in the magazine Newman edited, and that Lee "did not always delve deeply enough."

Kirkus Reviews described the book, metaphorically, as "Tasty morsels delivered quickly and reliably."

Martha Cornog of the Library Journal "[h]ighly recommended" the work, describing it as a "detailed and fascinating documentary".

Tim Kindseth of the Far Eastern Economic Review criticized the book for having an overall lack of focus and for, at times, focusing too much on the author; he stated that the contents "only faintly resemble those of more serious academic studies" although he stated the content was "ravenously researched". Kindseth stated that the content about the abuse of restaurant workers is the "most compelling", and a chapter about woes facing a Chinese immigrant family running a restaurant is "The most wrenching".

Publishers Weekly gave the book a starred review and stated that the work is "a winner".
