= General Tso's chicken =

Deep-fried chicken dish

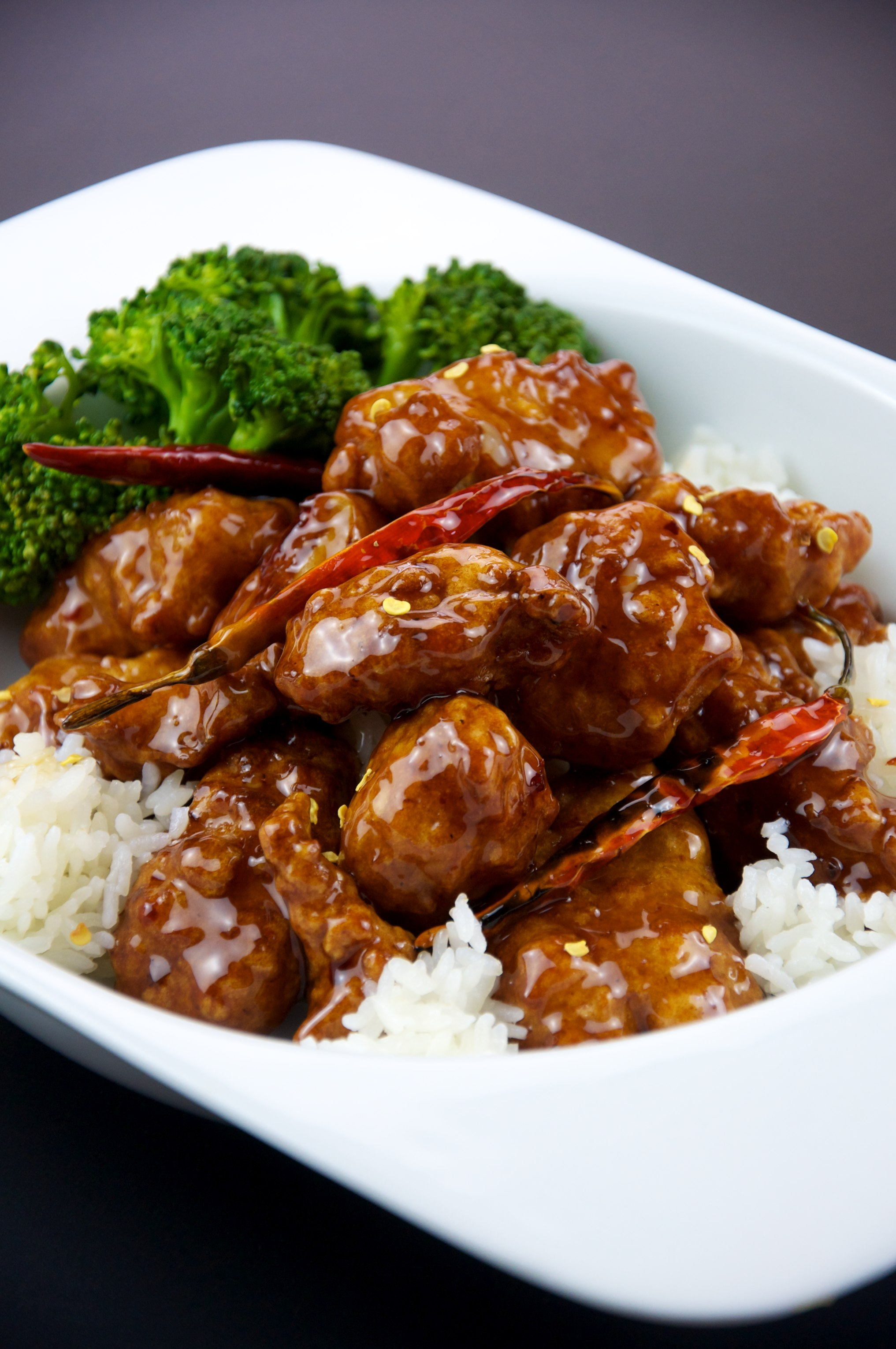
- General Tso's chicken
- Alternative names: (Note: Alternative names include: Governor Tso's chicken, General Tao's chicken, General Gao's[Gau's] chicken, General Mao's chicken, General Tsao's chicken, General Tong's chicken, General Tang's chicken, General T's Chicken, General Cho's chicken, General Chow's chicken, General Chai's chicken, General Joe's Chicken, T.S.O. Chicken, General Ching's chicken, General Jong's Chicken, General Sauce Chicken, House Chicken, Admiral Tso's chicken or simply General's Chicken.)
- Course: Main
- Serving temperature: Hot
- Main ingredients: Chicken, ginger, garlic, soy sauce, rice vinegar, Shaoxing wine or sherry, sugar, sesame oil, scallions, hot chili peppers, batter
- Variations: Orange chicken (Westernized version)

General Tso's chicken
- Traditional Chinese: 左宗棠雞
- Simplified Chinese: 左宗棠鸡
Transcriptions
Standard Mandarin
- Hanyu Pinyin: Zuǒ Zōngtáng jī
- Wade–Giles: Tso^{3} Tsung^{1}-t'ang^{2} chi^{1}
- IPA: [tswò tsʊ́ŋtʰǎŋ tɕí]
Xiang
- IPA: [tso˧˩ tsoŋ˧ tan˩˧ tɕi˧]
Yue: Cantonese
- Yale Romanization: Jó jūng tòhng gaì
- IPA: [tsɔ̌ː tsʊ́ŋ tʰɔ̏ːŋ kɐ̂i]
Southern Min
- Hokkien POJ: Chó-chong-tn̂g-ke

Alternative Chinese name
- Traditional Chinese: 左公雞
- Simplified Chinese: 左公鸡
Transcriptions
Standard Mandarin
- Hanyu Pinyin: Zuǒ gōng jī
- Wade–Giles: Tso^{3} kung^{1} chi^{1}
- IPA: [tswò kʊ́ŋ tɕí]
Yue: Cantonese
- Yale Romanization: Zo2 gung1 gai1
- Jyutping: Jó gūng gaì
- IPA: [tsɔ˧˥ kʊŋ˥ kɐj˥]
Southern Min
- Hokkien POJ: Chó-kong-ke

General Tso's chicken (Mandarin: [tswò]; simplified Chinese: 左宗棠鸡; traditional Chinese: 左宗棠雞; pinyin: Zuǒ Zōngtáng jī) is a Chinese-American sweet and spicy deep-fried chicken dish.

== Name ==
Although General Tso's chicken was invented in the 1970s, the dish was retroactively named for Zuo Zongtang (Tso Tsung-t'ang) (1812–1885), a Chinese statesman and military leader from Hunan Province during the late Qing dynasty. Chef Eileen Yin-Fei Lo speculated that name "Zongtang" was not a reference to Zuo Zongtang, but rather a reference to the homophone zongtang (宗堂), meaning "the hall of the ancestors". The dish is known by many alternative names, mostly replacing Tso with a different surname.

== Claims of origin ==
Two Chinese chefs, Peng Chang-kuei and T. T. Wang, each claimed to have invented General Tso's chicken in New York City. The two claims may be somewhat reconciled in that the current General Tso's chicken recipe – where the meat is crispy fried – was introduced by Wang under the name "General Ching's chicken", a name which still has trace appearances on menus on the Internet (the identity of its namesake "General Ching" is, however, unclear); whereas the name "General Tso's chicken" can be traced to Peng, who cooked it in a different way.

=== Peng's claim ===
Peng Chang-kuei, a chef from Hunan who was later based in Chongqing and Taipei, rolled out the new dish circa 1973 when he opened the restaurant "Uncle Peng's Hunan Yuan" on East 44th Street, New York City. Peng claimed his restaurant was the first in New York City to serve Tso's chicken. Since the dish was new, Peng made it the house specialty in spite of the dish's commonplace ingredients. A review of Uncle Peng in 1977 mentioned that their "General Tso's chicken was a stir-fried masterpiece, sizzling hot both in flavor and temperature". When Peng opened a restaurant in Hunan in the 1990s introducing Tso's chicken, the locals found the dish too sweet. His restaurant quickly closed in Hunan.

There are two stories purporting to explain how Peng Chang-kuei created the dish when he worked in Taipei before he introduced it to New York. Both stories linked to the fact that Peng was well connected to the senior Kuomintang politicians in Hunan, Chongqing and Taiwan. The first story was given by Peng himself in 2008 by Jennifer 8. Lee for the documentary The Search for General Tso (2014). In the documentary, Peng recalled in 1952 he was invited by the Republic of China Navy to be in charge of a three-day state banquet during Admiral Arthur W. Radford's visit of Taiwan. Peng claimed Tso's chicken was served on Radford's menu on the third day. According to U.S. diplomatic records, Radford's visit was during June 2–6, 1953. The second story was proposed by Taiwanese food writer Zhu Zhenfan in 2009, who said Chiang Ching-kuo, the son of President Chiang Kai-shek, paid a late visit to Peng's restaurant when Peng ran out of ingredients. Peng served Chiang an improvised dish, General Tso's chicken.

=== Wang's claim ===
New York's Shun Lee Palaces, located at East (155 E. 55th St.) and West (43 W. 65th St.), also claims that it was the first restaurant to serve General Tso's chicken and that it was invented by a Chinese immigrant chef named T. T. Wang in 1972. Michael Tong, owner of New York's Shun Lee Palaces, says "We opened the first Hunanese restaurant in the whole country, and the four dishes we offered you will see on the menu of practically every Hunanese restaurant in America today. They all copied from us."

== Popularity ==
Tso's chicken was spicy rather than sweet and spicy. It was altered to suit the tastes of Americans. The dish drew the attention of many food writers; among them were Fuchsia Dunlop from the United Kingdom and Jennifer 8. Lee from the U.S. The dish was adopted by some Hunan chefs. In Taiwan, it is not served sweet; the chicken is cooked with its skin and soy sauce plays a much more prominent role.

== Recipes ==
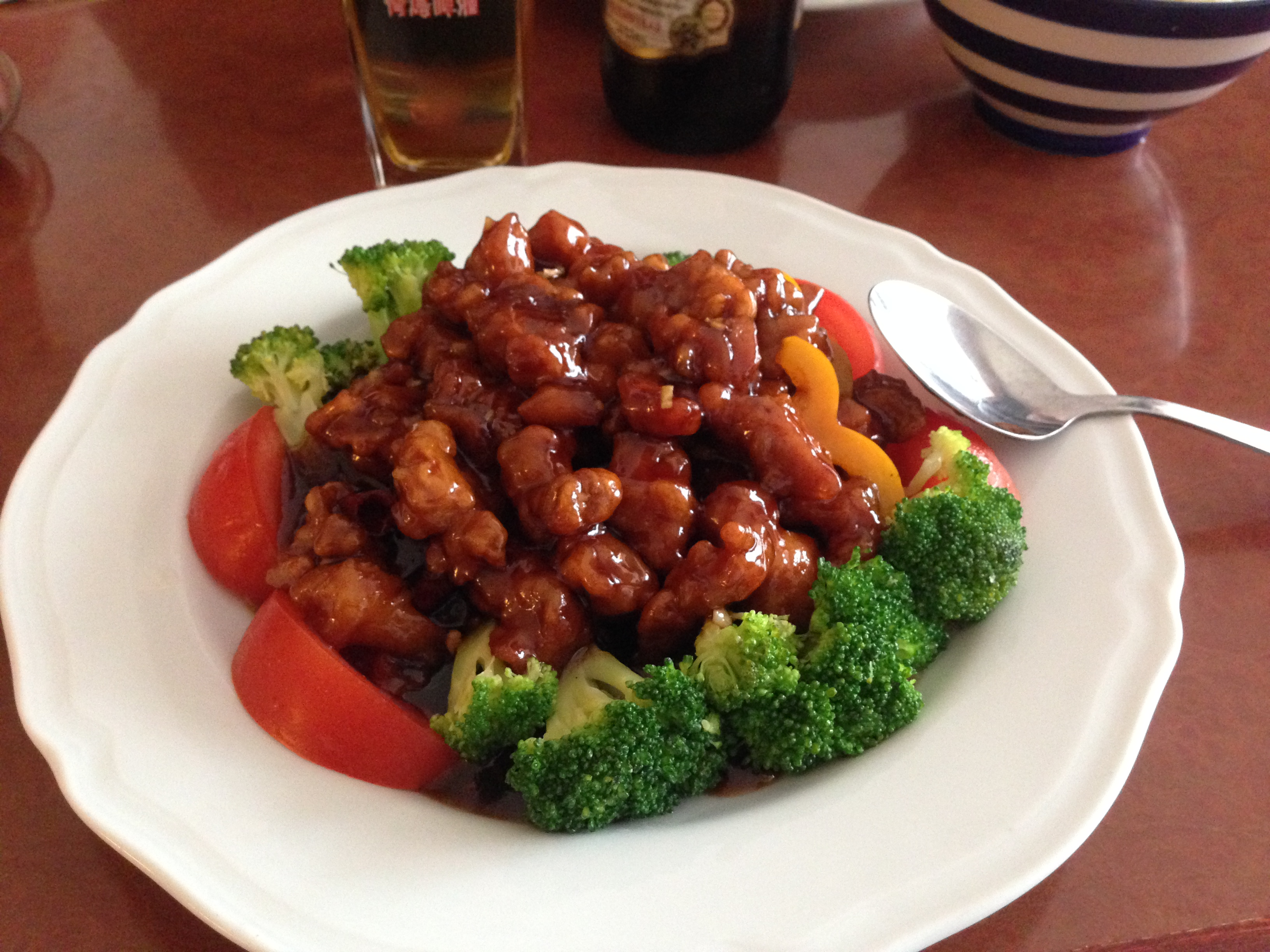
General Tso's chicken

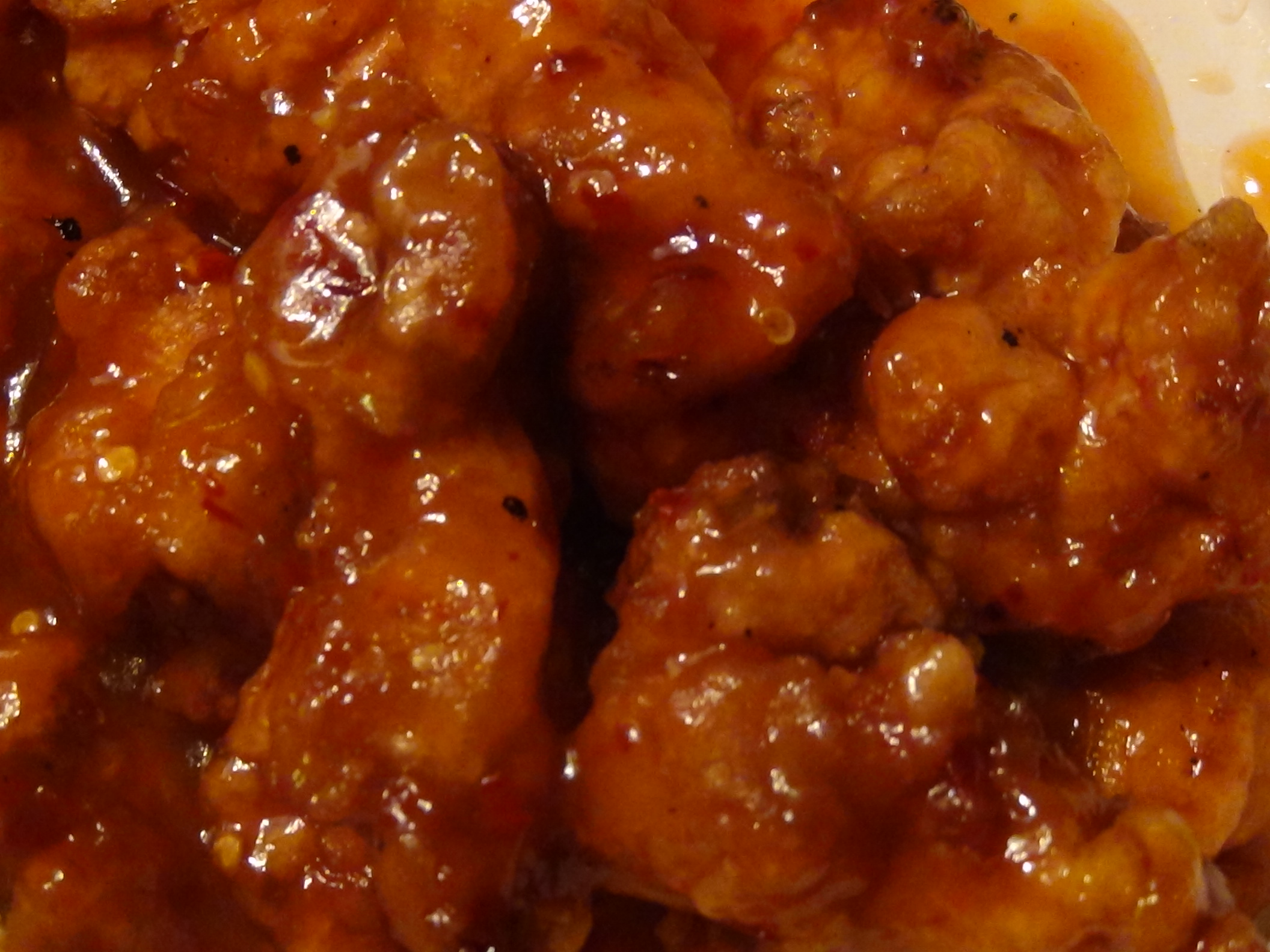
Close-up view of General Tso's chicken

Basic ingredients include:

- Sauce: soy sauce, rice wine, rice-wine vinegar, sugar, cornstarch, dried red chili peppers (whole), garlic.
- Batter / breading: egg, cornstarch.
- Dish: broccoli, chicken dark meat (cubed).

== See also ==
- Hunan cuisine
- American Chinese cuisine
- Canadian Chinese cuisine
- List of Taiwanese inventions and discoveries
- Crispy fried chicken
- Lemon chicken
- List of chicken dishes
- Orange chicken
- Sesame chicken
