= Jennifer 8. Lee =

Chinese-American journalist (born 1976)

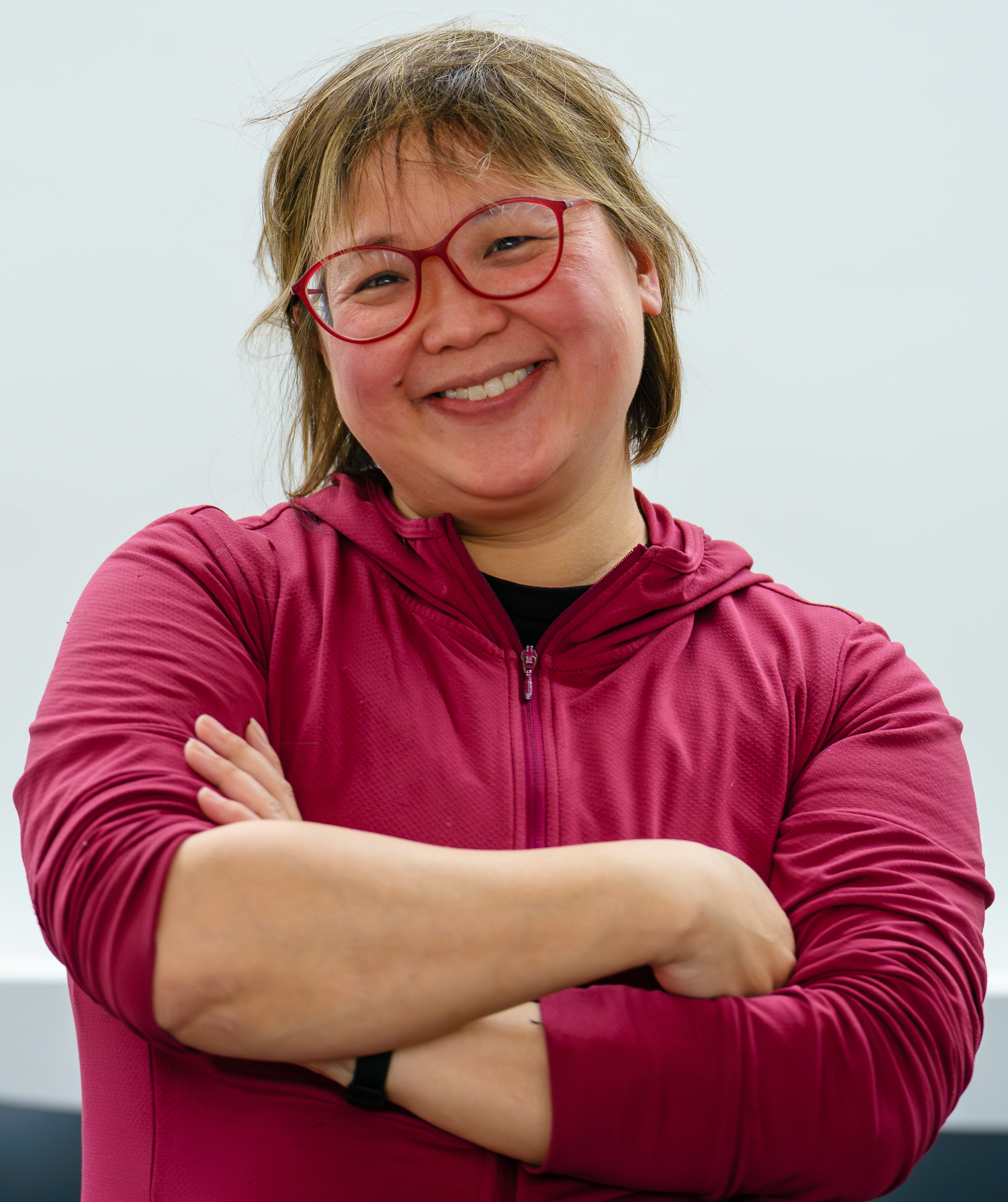
- Lee in 2023
- Born: Jennifer Lee; March 15, 1976 (age 50); New York City, U.S.
- Education: Harvard University (BA)
- Occupation: Journalist
- Notable credit: The New York Times

Chinese name
- Traditional Chinese: 李競
- Hanyu Pinyin: Lǐ Jìng
- Hokkien POJ: Lí Kēng
- Website: www.jennifer8lee.com

Jennifer 8. Lee (born March 15, 1976) is an American journalist who previously worked for The New York Times. She is the co-founder and president of the literary studio Plympton and a producer of The Search for General Tso, which premiered at the 2014 Tribeca Film Festival.

Lee is a former vice-chair of the Unicode Emoji Subcommittee, which is responsible for making recommendations relating to emoji to the Unicode Technical Committee. Inspired by the universality of the dumpling across cultures and cuisines (e.g., jiaozi in China, ravioli in Italy, pierogi in Poland, empanadas in various Latin American countries), she helped to make the dumpling emoji a candidate. She also co-authored the proposal for a hijab emoji.

== Early life and education ==
Lee was born on March 15, 1976, to a Taiwanese American family in New York City, and raised in Harlem, Manhattan. Her parents were Taiwanese immigrants from Kinmen, near the Chinese coast. Lee was not given a middle name at birth so she chose "8." when she was a teenager. In Chinese culture, the number eight symbolizes prosperity and good luck.

Lee graduated from Hunter College High School in Manhattan in 1994. She then graduated from Harvard University in 1999 with a Bachelor of Arts in applied mathematics and economics.

== Career ==
While a student at Harvard, Lee was the vice president of The Harvard Crimson student newspaper. She interned at The Washington Post, The Wall Street Journal, The Boston Globe, Newsday, and The New York Times during college. She worked for the New York Times for nine years, accepting a buyout in 2009. Lee wrote a book about the history of Chinese food in the United States and around the world, titled The Fortune Cookie Chronicles, documenting the process on her blog. Warner Books editor Jonathan Karp struck a deal with Lee to write a book about "how Chinese food is more all-American than apple pie." She appeared on The Colbert Report to promote the book. Published in 2008, the book was #26 on the New York Times Best Seller list. Lee attempted to popularize the term "man date" in a 2005 New York Times article, which subsequently inspired the 2009 film I Love You, Man starring Paul Rudd, Jason Segel, and Rashida Jones.

Lee has served on the advisory panel for the John S. and James L. Knight Foundation's "News Challenge", and has assisted the whistle-blowing site WikiLeaks dealing with publicity. She helped the organization with its April 2010 release of a video showing the July 12, 2007, Baghdad airstrike. Lee serves on the board of directors of the Center for Public Integrity, the advisory board of the Nieman Foundation for Journalism, and the Asian American Writers' Workshop. She is also an advisor to Upworthy.

In 2011, Lee and fellow writer Yael Goldstein Love founded a literary studio named Plympton, Inc. The studio focuses on publishing serialized fiction for digital platforms. Investors include Reddit co-founder Alexis Ohanian, Y Combinator partner Garry Tan, Delicious founder Joshua Schachter, Hipmunk founder Adam Goldstein, Inkling founder Matt MacInnis, Columbia Law Professor Tim Wu, Quora co-founder Charlie Cheever, and Tony Hsieh's Vegas Tech Fund. Its first series launched in September 2012 as part of the Kindle Serials program. Its app Rooster, launched in March 2014, is a mobile reading service for iOS7.

In 2012, Lee created NewsDiffs, a website that archives article revisions from The New York Times, CNN, Politico, The Washington Post, and the BBC, with two brothers who were programmers, MIT graduate student Eric Price and Tddium employee Greg Price. They built the website in 38 hours (including sleep) during the June 16–17, 2012, Knight-Mozilla-M.I.T. hackathon at the MIT Media Lab. Lee is a producer of the documentary Artificial Gamer and is also involved in running a film enthusiast organization, Goodside. In 2024, Lee and other Wikipedia contributors founded WikiPortraits, a group of photographers working to improve Wikipedia's access to freely-licensed photos of notable people.

== See also ==
- Chinese Americans in New York City
- New Yorkers in journalism
- Taiwanese Americans in New York City
