= Guihe =

Guihe may refer to:

- Guihe Pavilion (龜鶴亭), an architecture of the Former Residence of Zuo Zongtang
- Guihe Shopping Center (贵和商厦), a shopping mall in Jinan, Shandong province, China
- Guihe Subdistrict (贵和街道), Tiexi, Shenyang, Liaoning Province, China
- Taishan Guihe metro station, a station of the Taoyuan Airport MRT
- Zhao Guihe (趙貴和; 1207–1225), a crown prince of the Song dynasty
