= Former residence of Zuo Zongtang =

Former Residence of Zuo Zongtang
- 左宗棠故居
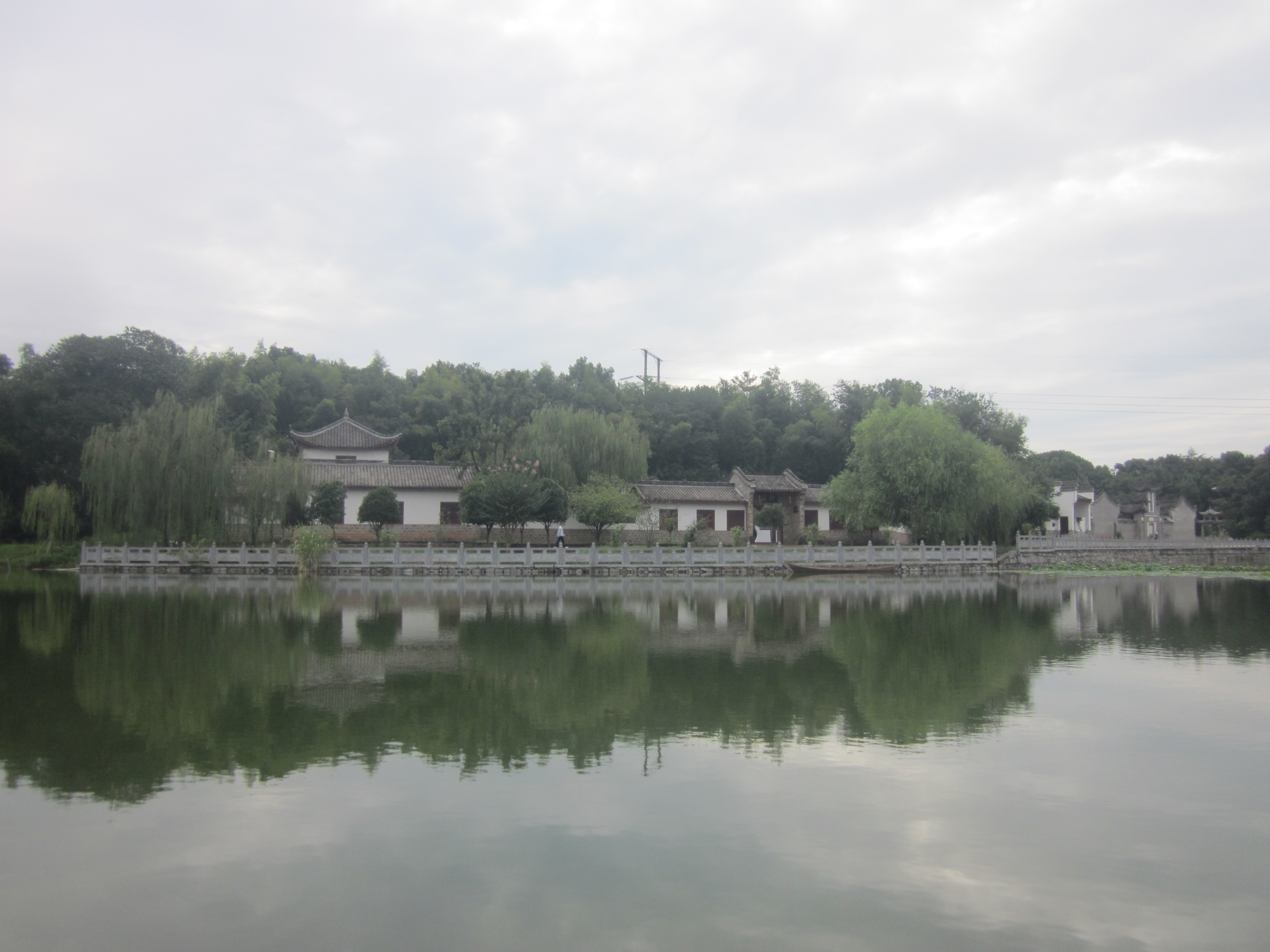
- Former Residence of Zuo Zongtang.

- Location within Hunan

General information
- Type: Traditional folk house
- Location: Zhangshu, Xiangyin County, Hunan, China
- Coordinates: 28°33′19″N 112°52′27″E
- Completed: 1843

Height
- Roof: Gabbled roof

The former residence of Zuo Zongtang (Chinese: 左宗棠故居; pinyin: Zuǒ Zōngtáng Gùjū) located in Zhangshu, Xiangyin County, Hunan, China, is the former residence of Zuo Zongtang, a statesman and military leader in the late Qing dynasty (1644–1911).

== Etymology ==
Zuo Zongtang liked willows, which are vigorous and indomitable, so he named the house "Willow Manor" (柳庄; Liǔ Zhuāng).

== History ==
The traditional folk house was built in 1843, in the 23rd year of Daoguang period in the Qing dynasty (1644–1911). It cost 900 taels of silver. Zuo lived in the house from October 1844 to 1857, when he moved to Changsha, the capital city of Hunan province.

The local government allocated $2 million for reconstruction in 2004. On July 27, 2010, it was listed as a National Patriotic Education Base by the Central Propaganda Department of the Chinese Communist Party.

== Gallery ==
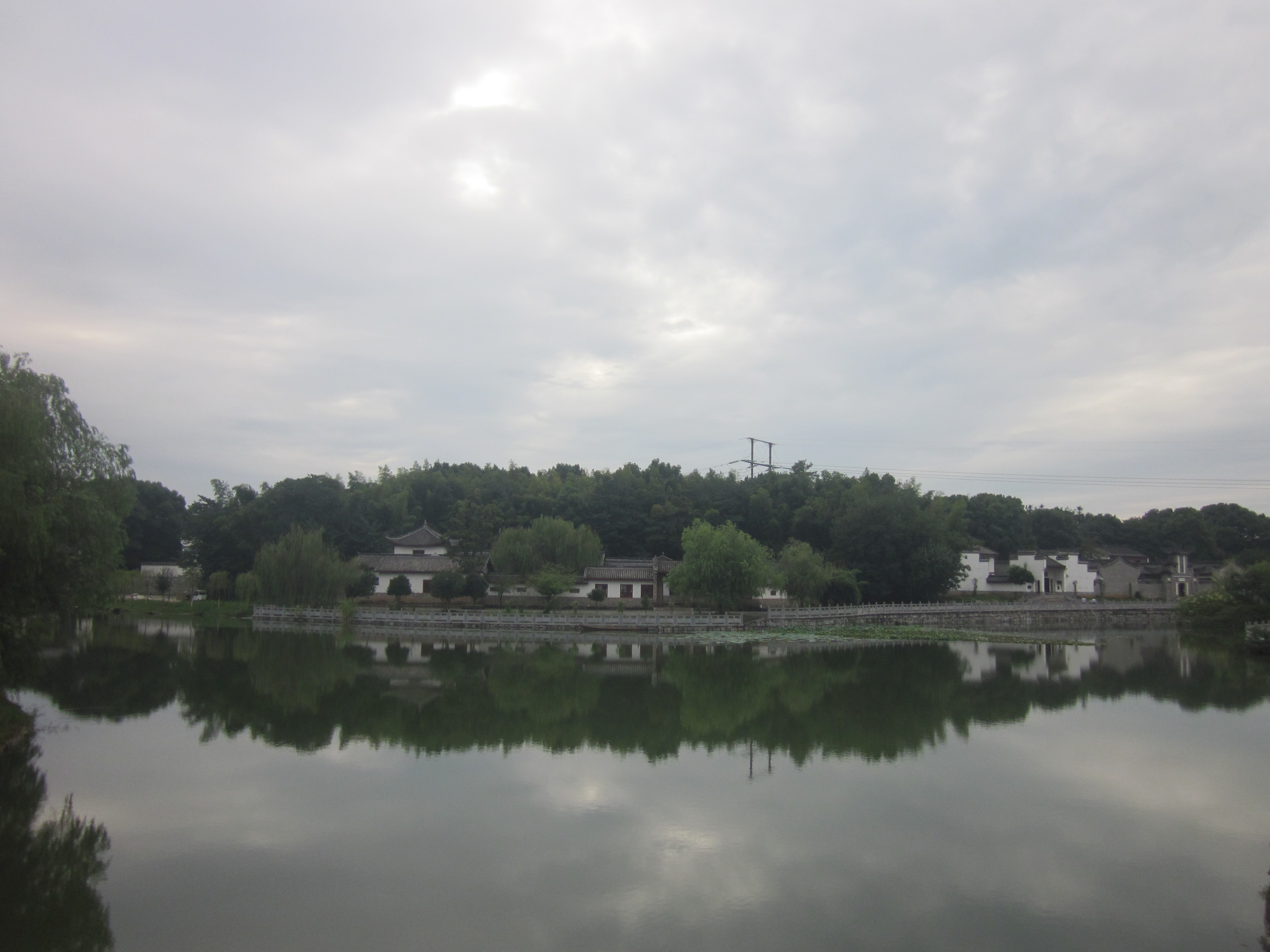
A front view of the Former Residence of Zuo Zongtang.

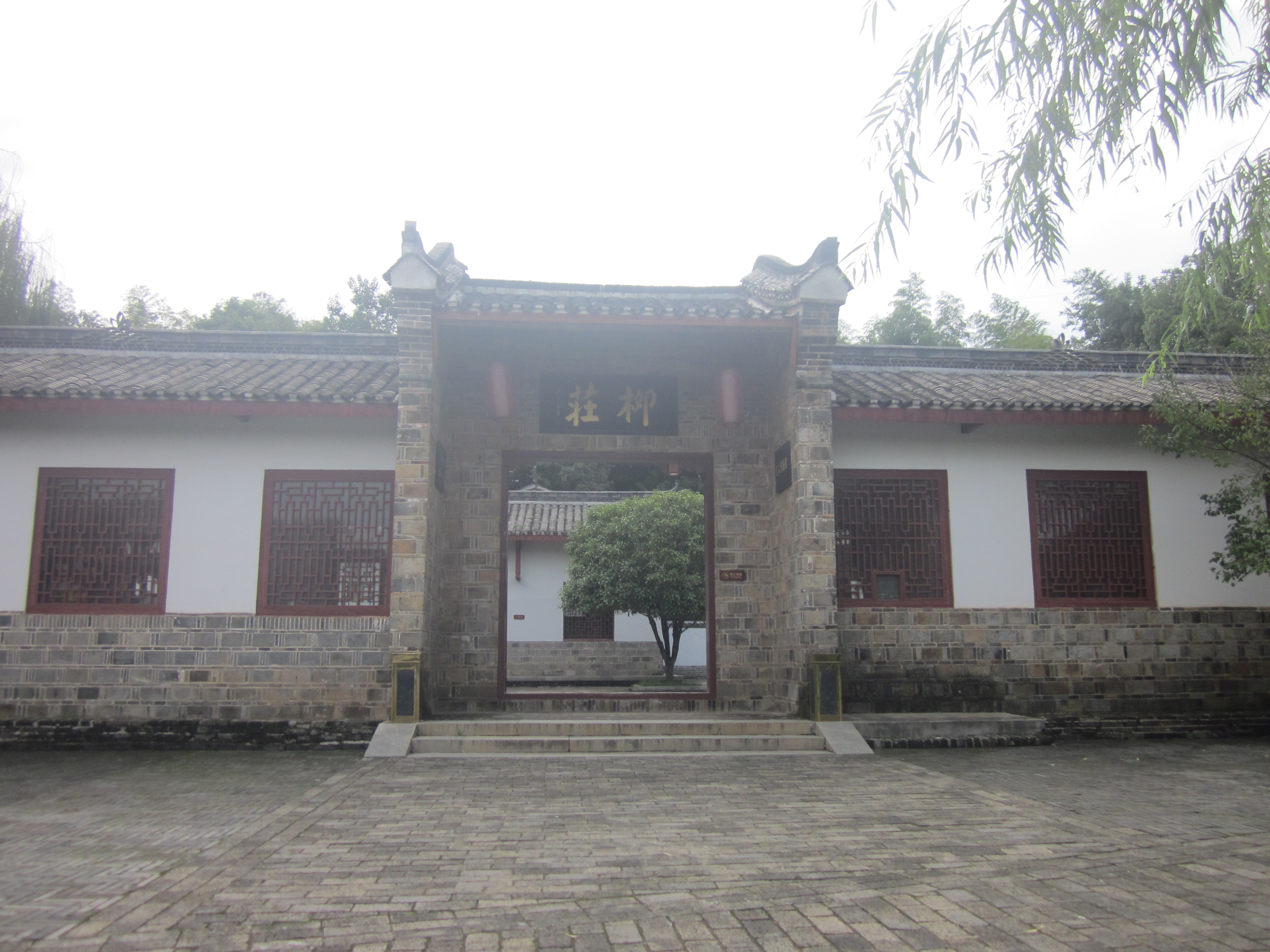
Front door of the Former Residence of Zuo Zongtang.

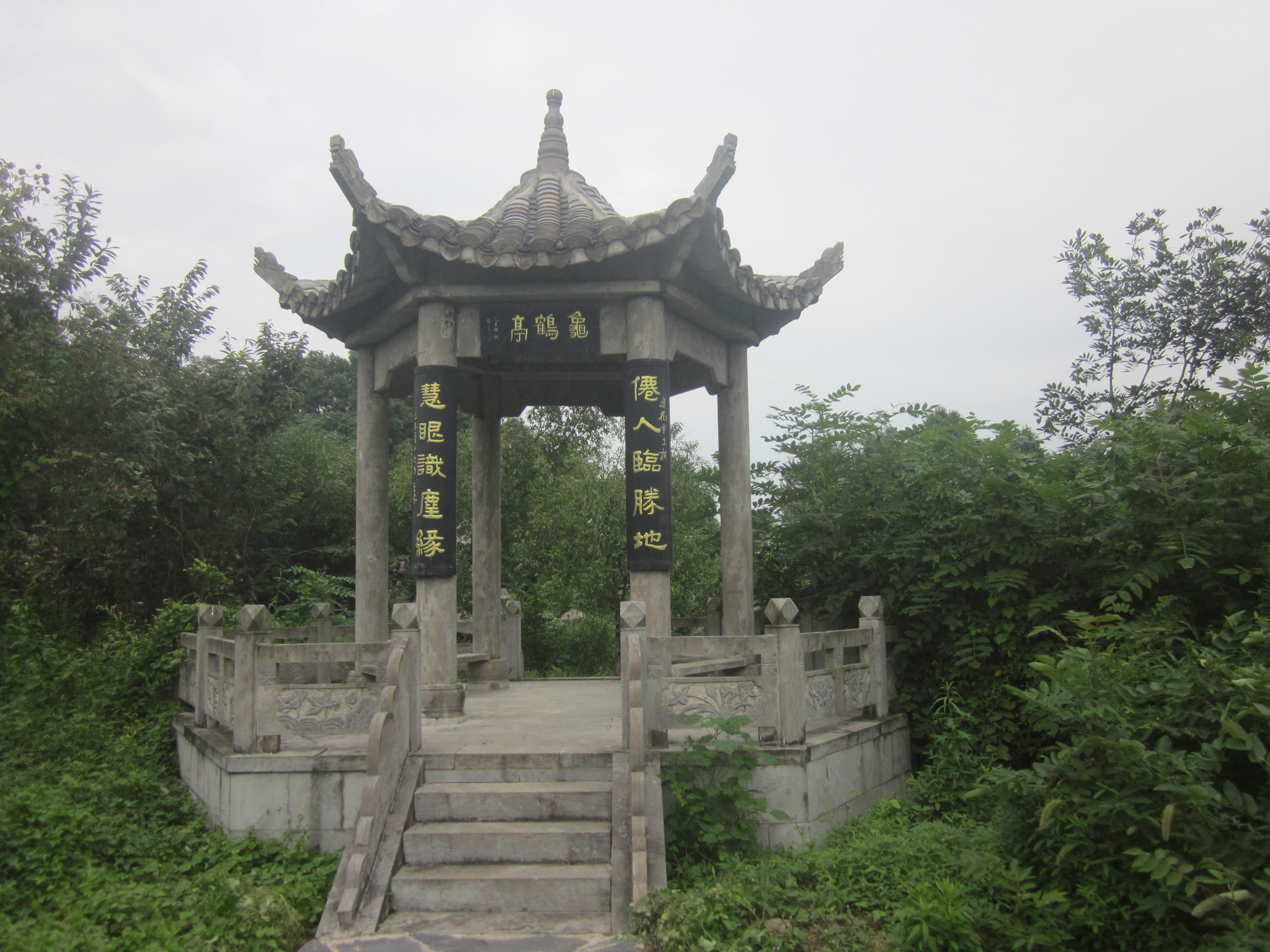
"Guihe" (tortoise and crane) Pavilion

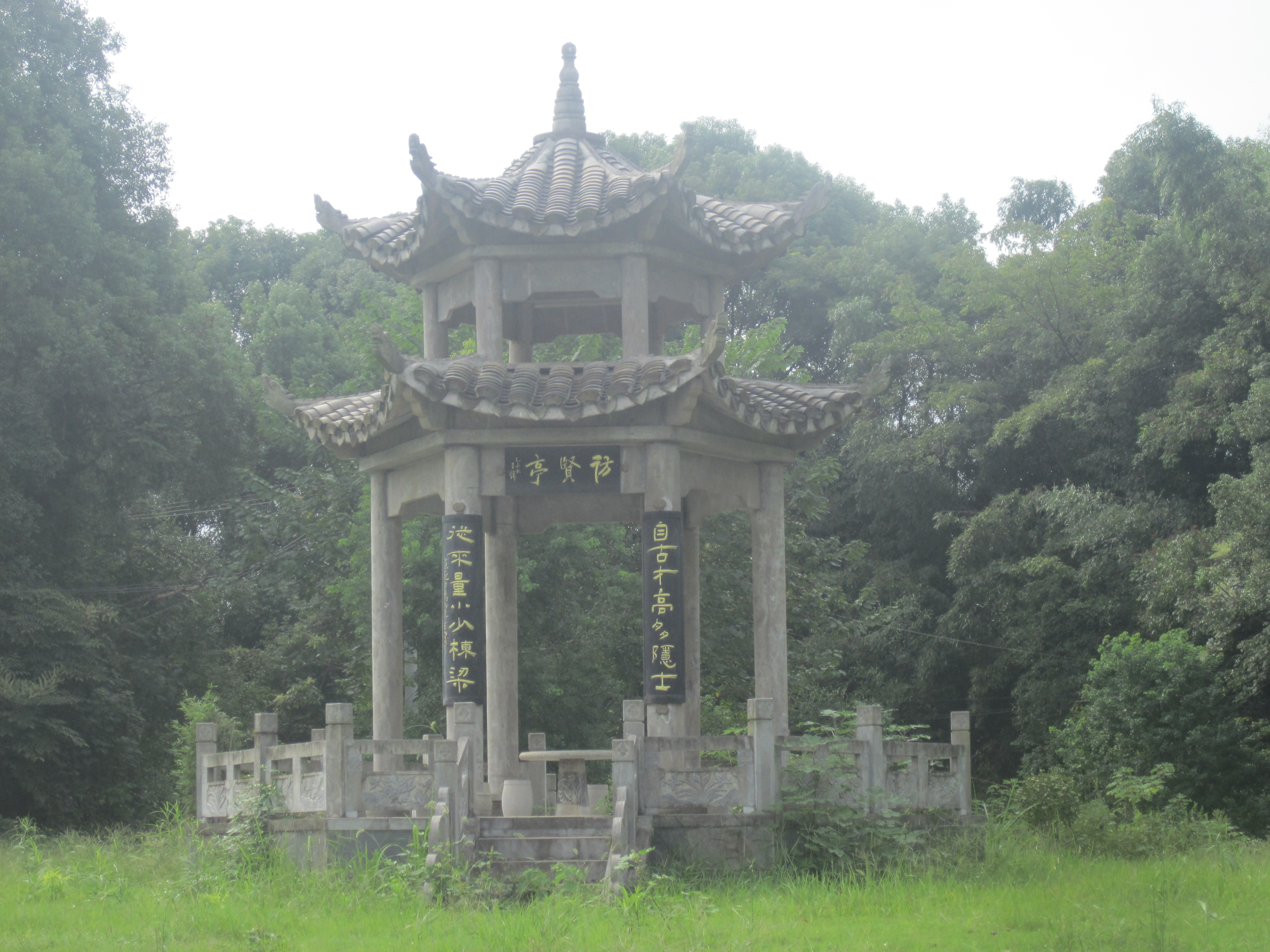
"Fangxian" (Visiting the Sage) Pavilion

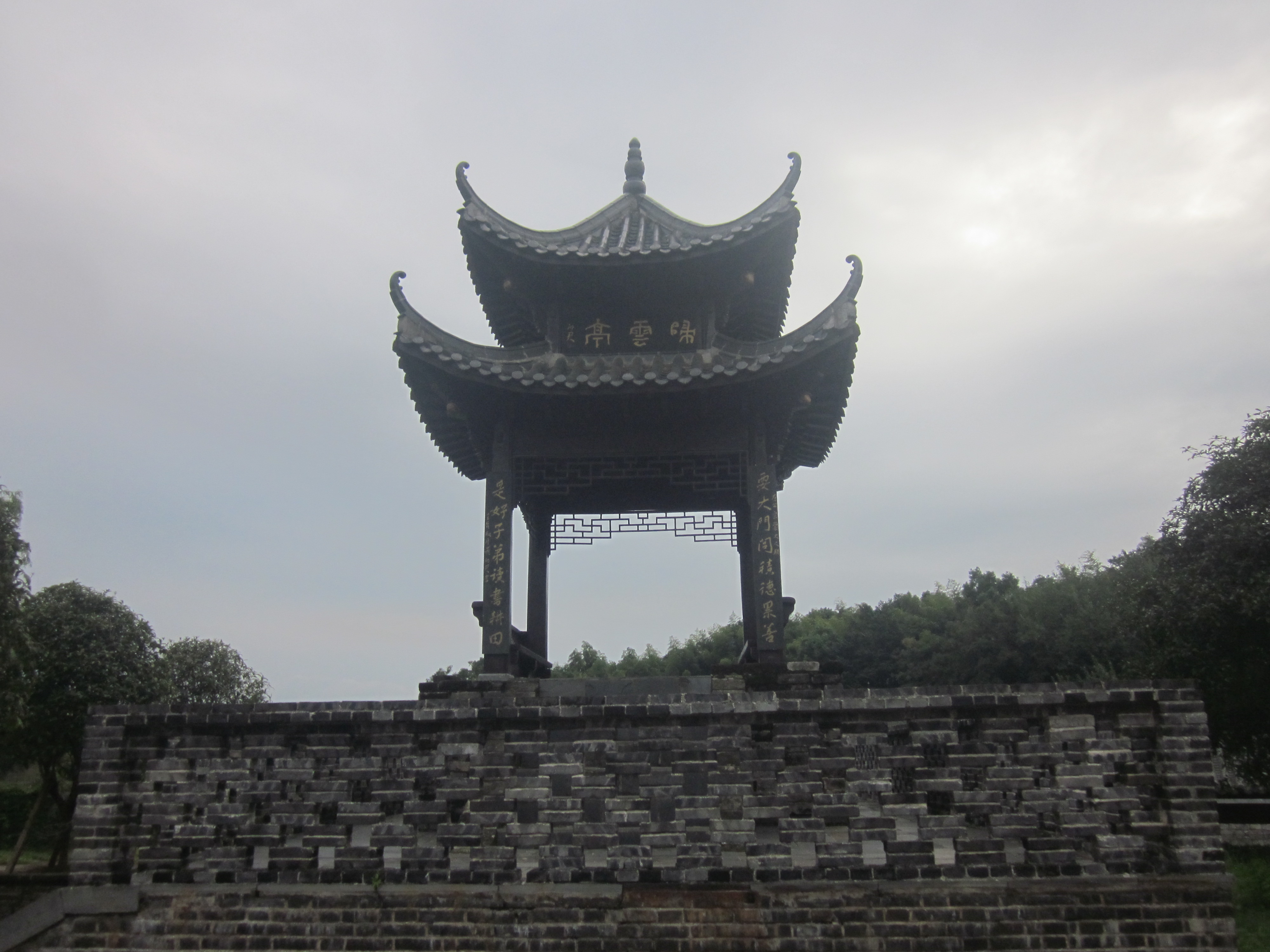
"Guiyun" (Clouds) Pavilion

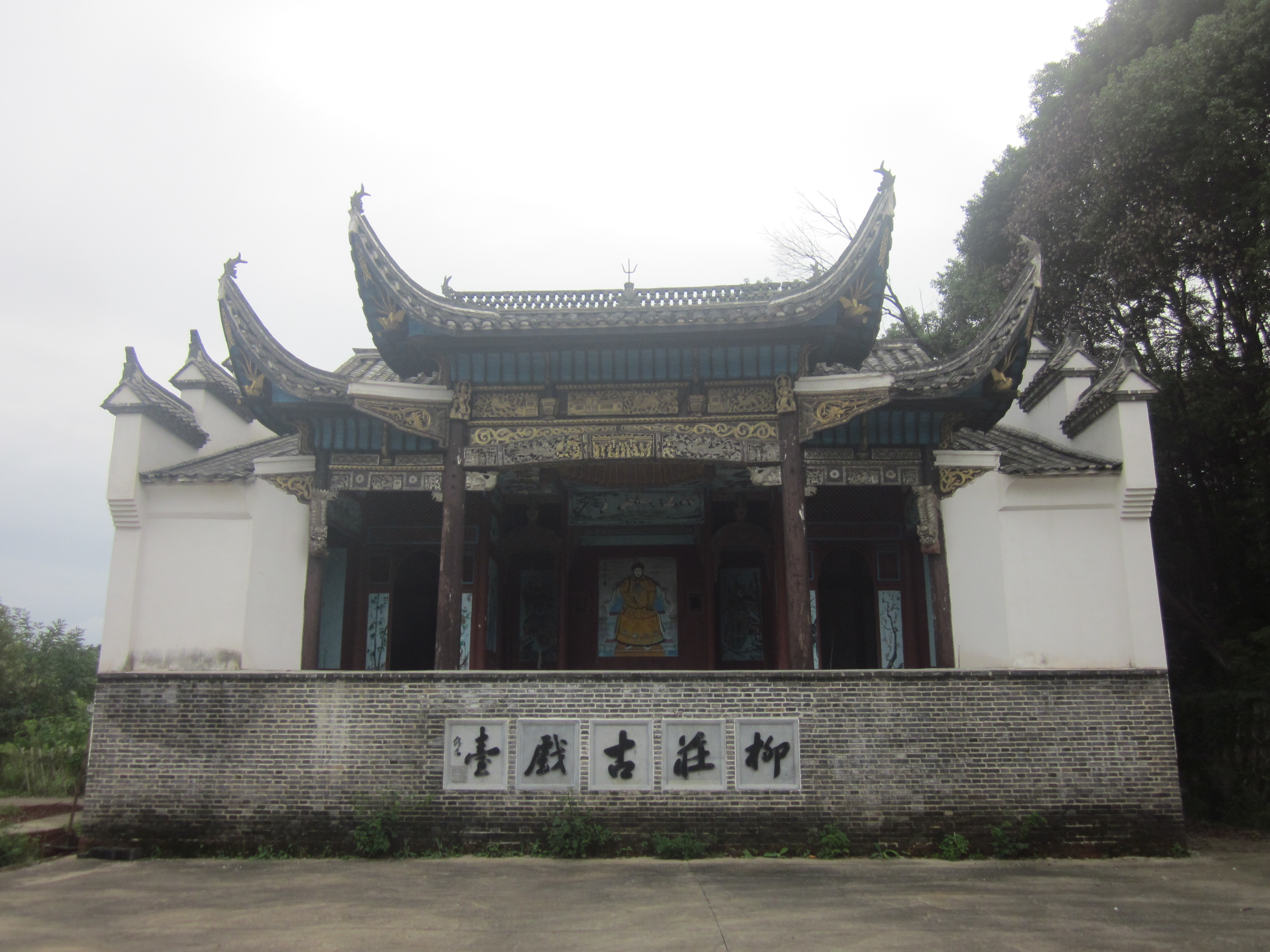
Stage

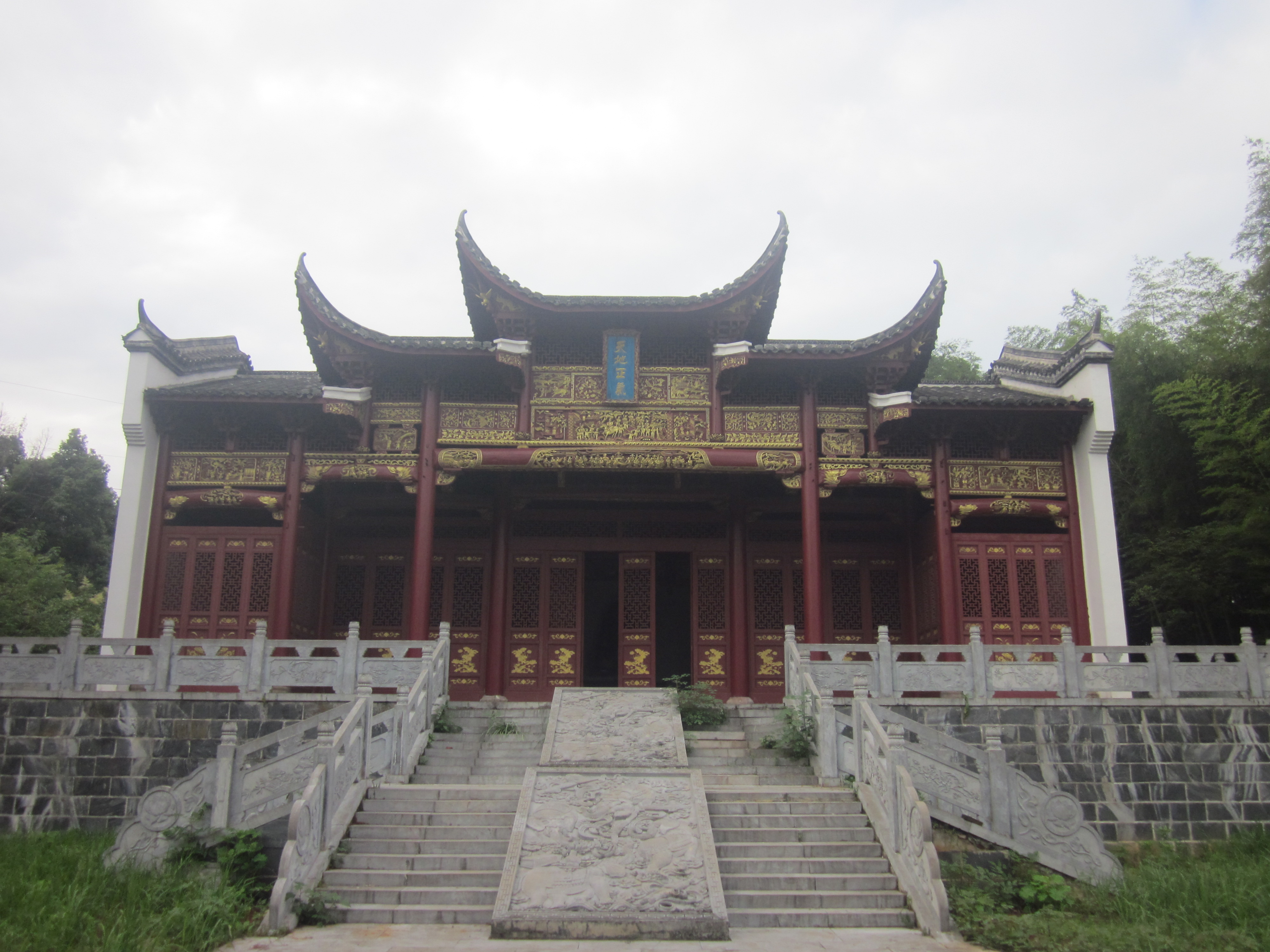
Zuo Zongtang Memorial Temple

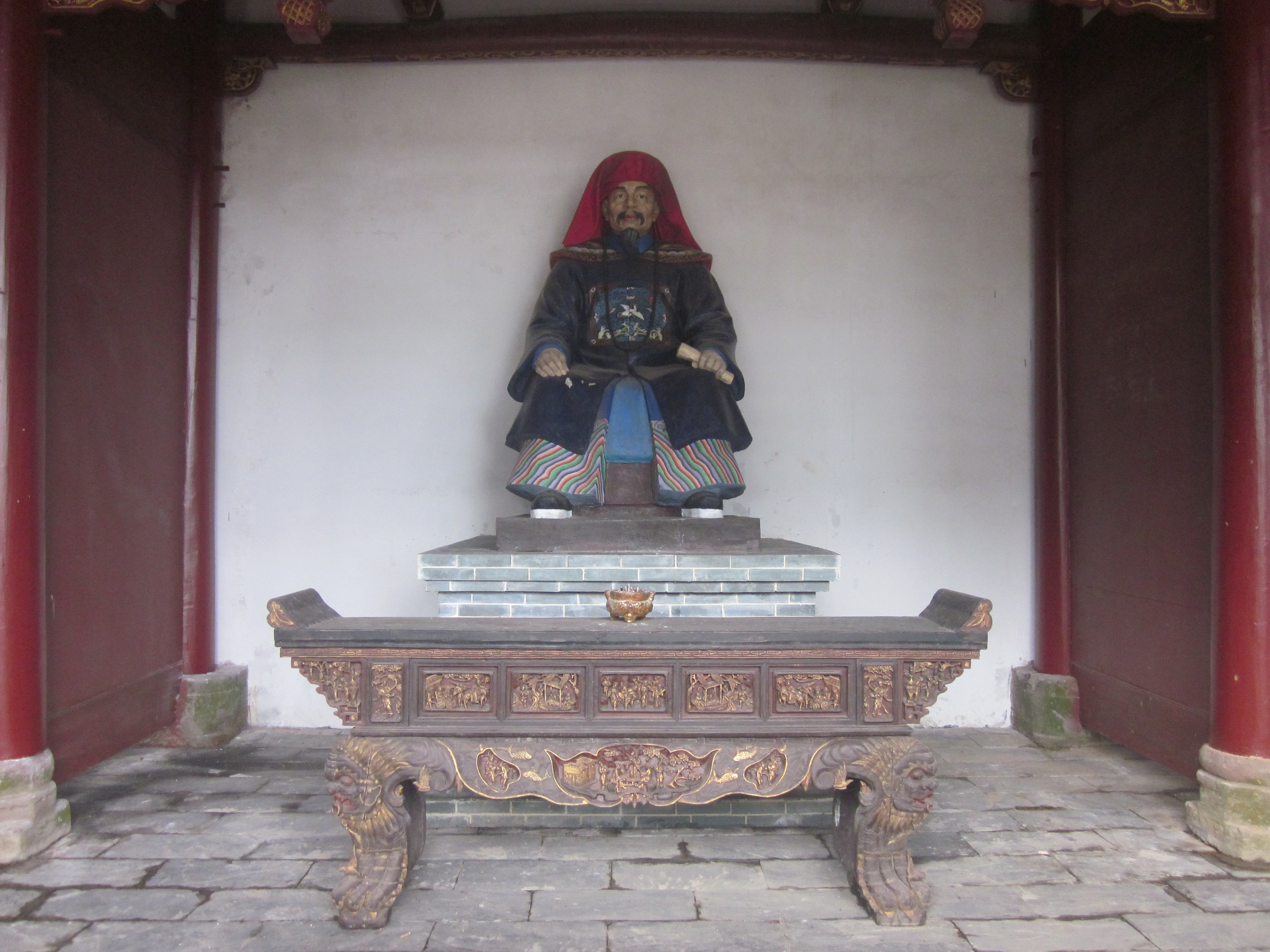
Statue of Zuo Zongtang

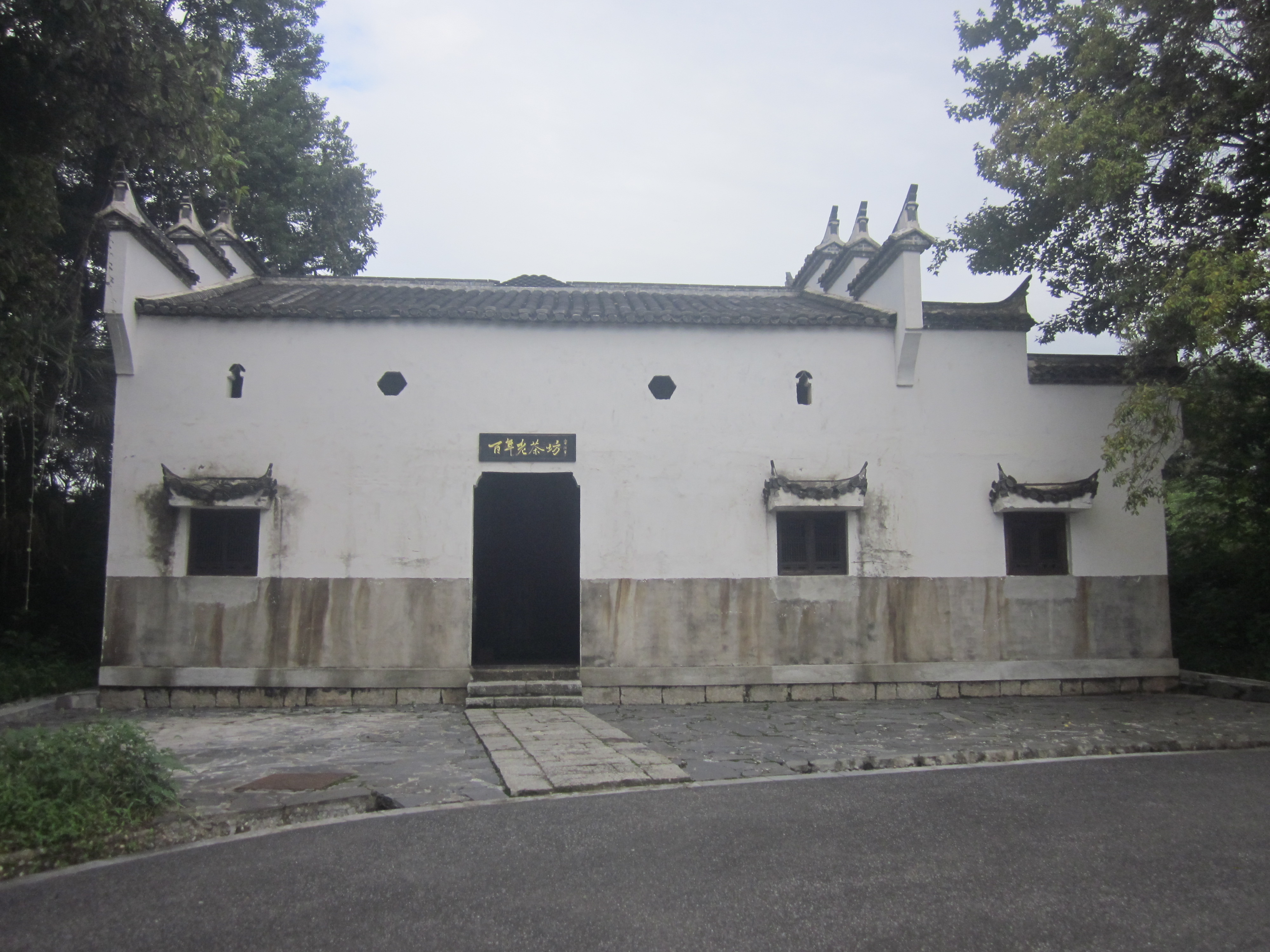
Teahouse
