= Zhangshu, Xiangyin County =

Zhangshu 樟树镇
- Town
- Location in Hunan
- Coordinates: 28.56306°N 112.81167°E
- Country: People's Republic of China
- Province: Hunan
- Prefecture-level city: Yueyang
- County: Xiangyin County
- Time zone: UTC+8 (China Standard)

Zhangshu (simplified Chinese: 樟树; traditional Chinese: 樟樹; pinyin: Zhāngshù) is a town under the administration of Xiangyin County, in northeastern Hunan, China. As of 2018, it has one residential community and seven villages under its administration.
