= Liu Zhiren =

Chinese politician

- 刘志仁

Director of the Environmental Resources Committee of Hunan Provincial People's Congress
- In office August 2024 – 28 December 2024
- Preceded by: Wen Zhiqiang
- Succeeded by: TBA

Communist Party Secretary of Xiangtan
- In office March 2022 – August 2024
- Preceded by: Zhang Yingchun
- Succeeded by: Hu Hebo

Communist Party Secretary of Chenzhou
- In office March2021 – March 2022
- Preceded by: Yi Pengfei
- Succeeded by: Wu Jupei

Mayor of Chenzhou
- In office January 2017 – May 2021
- Preceded by: Qu Hai
- Succeeded by: Wu Jupei

Personal details
- Born: September 1964 (age 62) Xinshao County, Hunan, China
- Party: Chinese Communist Party
- Education: Hunan Water Resources and Hydropower School; Central Party School of the Chinese Communist Party

Chinese name
- Simplified Chinese: 刘志仁
- Traditional Chinese: 劉志仁
Transcriptions
Standard Mandarin
- Hanyu Pinyin: Liú Zhìrén

Liu Zhiren (Chinese: 刘志仁; born September 1964) is a former Chinese executive and politician. He handed himself in to the anti-corruption agency of China in December 2024. He served as party secretary of Xiangtan from 2022 to 2024 and mayor and party secretary of Chenzhou from 2016 to 2022.

Liu was a representative of the 20th National Congress of the Chinese Communist Party and a delegate to the 13th National People's Congress.

== Early life and education ==
Liu was born in Xinshao County, Hunan, in September 1964. In 1983, he enrolled at Hunan Water Resources and Hydropower School, where he majored in water conservancy and hydropower engineering construction. He joined the Chinese Communist Party (CCP) in May 1986 before graduation.

== Career ==
After graduation in 1986, Liu became an official in Mayang Miao Autonomous County and five months later became a quality inspector at Liuduzhai Reservoir in Longhui County. In June 1987, he was assigned to the Hunan Provincial Water Resources and Hydropower Department, and served for over five years. In March 1993, he moved to the Comprehensive Investment Department of Hunan Provincial Economic Construction Investment Company, where he was deputy general manager in July 1994 and general manager in July 1996. In November 2002, he was made chairman of the Zhangjiajie Airport Industrial Co., Ltd., but having held the position for only six months. In June 2003, he became deputy general manager of Hunan Airport Management Group Co., Ltd., rising to general manager in August 2007. He also served as director of Hunan Provincial Airport Management Bureau from September 2012 to December 2016.

In December 2016, Liu was named acting mayor of Chenzhou, confirmed in January 2017. He rose to party secretary, the top political position in the city, in March 2021. In March 2022, he was transferred to Xiangtan and appointed party secretary. In August 2024, he was chosen as director of the Environmental Resources Committee of Hunan Provincial People's Congress.

== Downfall ==
On 28 December 2024, Liu surrendered himself to and is cooperating with the Central Commission for Discipline Inspection (CCDI) and National Supervisory Commission for investigation of "suspected violations of disciplines and laws". He is the fourth party secretary to be targeted by China's top anticorruption watchdog, after Dai Daojin, Xiang Lili, and Yi Pengfei. He is also the third party secretary to be disgraced by China's top anticorruption watchdog, after Chen Sanxin and Cao Jiongfang.

Government offices
Preceded by Qu Hai	Mayor of Chenzhou; 2017–2021	Succeeded by Wu Jupei
Party political offices
Preceded by Yi Pengfei	Communist Party Secretary of Chenzhou; 2021–2022	Succeeded by Wu Jupei
Preceded by Zhang Yingchun	Communist Party Secretary of Xiangtan; 2022–2024	Succeeded by Hu Hebo
Assembly seats
Preceded by Wen Zhiqiang (文志强)	Director of the Environmental Resources Committee of Hunan Provincial People's Congress; 2024	Succeeded by TBA
