= Zhao Yingyun =

Chinese politician

- 赵应云

Communist Party Secretary of Hunan Rural Credit Cooperatives
- In office February 2019 – January 2022
- Succeeded by: Zhang Shiping

Mayor of Yongzhou
- In office December 2017 – February 2019
- Party Secretary: Li Hui
- Preceded by: Yi Jialiang
- Succeeded by: He Luchun

Mayor of Huaihua
- In office June 2014 – December 2017
- Party Secretary: Peng Guofu
- Preceded by: Li Hui (born 1970)
- Succeeded by: Lei Shaoye

Personal details
- Born: June 1963 (age 63) Shaodong County, Hunan, China
- Party: Chinese Communist Party
- Education: Central China Normal University; Hunan Normal University

Chinese name
- Simplified Chinese: 赵应云
- Traditional Chinese: 趙應雲
Transcriptions
Standard Mandarin
- Hanyu Pinyin: Zhào Yìngyún

Zhao Yingyun (Chinese: 赵应云; born June 1963) is a former Chinese politician who spent his entire career in his home province Hunan. He was investigated by China's top anti-graft agency in July 2022. He served as mayor of Huaihua from 2014 to 2017, mayor of Yongzhou from 2017 to 2019, and Communist Party Secretary of Hunan Rural Credit Cooperatives from 2019 to 2022.

He was a delegate to the 13th National People's Congress.

== Biography ==
Zhao was born in Shaodong County (now Shaodong), Hunan, in June 1963. He received his master's degree in law from Central China Normal University in 1993 and a doctor's degree in philosophy from Hunan Normal University in 2003, respectively.

Zhao taught at Shaodong No. 6 High School from July 1983 to September 1990 and worked as an editor and journalist at Hunan Daily from June 1993 to January 1997.

Zhao joined the Chinese Communist Party (CCP) in March 1994, and got involved in politics in January 1997, when he was transferred to the Publicity Department of the CCP Hunan Provincial Committee. He was appointed party secretary of Zhongfang County in November 2008 and was admitted to the Standing Committee of the CCP Huaihua Municipal Committee, the city's top authority. In September 2011, he became a member of the Standing Committee of the CCP Changde Municipal Committee, in addition to serving as secretary of the Discipline Inspection Commission. In May 2013, he was named acting vice mayor of Changde, confirmed in the following month. In June 2014, he was transferred back to Huaihua and appointed deputy party secretary. He was made acting mayor in July 2014 and was installed in December of that same year. In December 2017, he was chosen as deputy party secretary and acting mayor of Yongzhou, confirmed in January 2018. He became party secretary of Hunan Rural Credit Cooperatives in February 2019, and served until January 2022.

=== Investigation ===
On 27 July 2022, he was placed under investigation for "serious violations of laws and regulations" by the Central Commission for Discipline Inspection (CCDI), the party's internal disciplinary body, and the National Supervisory Commission, the highest anti-corruption agency of China.

Government offices
Preceded by Li Hui	Mayor of Huaihua; 2014–2017	Succeeded by Lei Shaoye
Preceded by Yi Jialiang	Mayor of Yongzhou; 2017–2019	Succeeded by He Luchun
Party political offices
Preceded by ?	Communist Party Secretary of Hunan Rural Credit Cooperatives; 2019–2022	Succeeded by Zhang Shiping
