= Wang Qun =

Wang Qun is the name of:

- Wang Qun (actor) (1960–2008), Chinese actor
- Wang Qun (swimmer) (born 1991), Chinese swimmer
- Wang Qun (Go player) (王群)

== Politicians ==
- Wang Qun (politician, born 1926) (1926–2017), Chinese politician who served as Communist Party Secretary of Inner Mongolia
- Wang Qun (politician, born 1961), Chinese politician who served as mayor of Zhuzhou, Communist Party Secretary of Changde, chairman of Changde Municipal People's Congress.
