= Zhou Derui =

Chinese politician

- 周德睿

Vice Mayor of Tianjin
- In office March 2021 – November 2021
- Mayor: Liao Guoxun

Personal details
- Born: February 1966 (age 60) Qidong County, Hunan, China
- Party: Chinese Communist Party (1991–2025; expelled)
- Education: Hunan Normal University; Tsinghua University

Zhou Derui (Chinese: 周德睿; pinyin: Zhōu Déruì; born February 1966) is a former Chinese politician. As of March 2025 he was under investigation by China's top anti-graft watchdog.

He was a delegate to the 13th National People's Congress. He was a representative of the 20th National Congress of the Chinese Communist Party.

== Early life and education ==
Zhou was born in Qidong County, Hunan, in February 1966. In 1983, he enrolled at Hunan Normal University, where he majored in politics. In 1987 he went on to attend Tsinghua University, where he received his master's degree in law.

== Career in Hunan ==
Zhou began his political career in December 1989, and joined the Chinese Communist Party (CCP) in December 1991. He was an official in Lingling Prefecture from 1989 to 1992. Starting in July 1992, he served in several posts in Hunan Provincial Office of Economic and Technological Cooperation (later was reshuffled as the Economic Division of the General Office of Hunan Provincial People's Government), including deputy principal staff member and principal staff member. In September 2000, he moved to Hunan Provincial Land and Resources Department, where he successively served as director of General Office, director of Finance Division, and deputy inspector.

Zhou was appointed head of the Organization Department of the CCP Yongzhou Municipal Committee in October 2006 and was admitted to standing committee member of the CCP Yongzhou Municipal Committee, the city's top authority. He was made vice mayor in November 2010.

Zhou became deputy party secretary of Changde in March 2013, concurrently serving as mayor since May of the same year. He was party secretary, the top political position in the city, beginning in June 2017. He also served as chairman of the Changde Municipal People's Congress from December 2017 to March 2021.

== Career in Tianjin ==
In March 2021, Zhou was transferred to north China's Tianjin municipality and appointed vice mayor. Six months later, he concurrently served as head of the Publicity Department of the CCP Tianjin Municipal Committee and was admitted to standing committee member of the CCP Tianjin Municipal Committee, the municipality's top authority. In June 2022, he was chosen as head of the Organization Department of the CCP Tianjin Municipal Committee, and held that office until March 2025.

== Investigation ==
On 13 March 2025, Zhou was put under investigation for alleged "serious violations of discipline and laws" by the Central Commission for Discipline Inspection (CCDI), the party's internal disciplinary body, and the National Supervisory Commission, the highest anti-corruption agency of China. On September 4, he was expelled from the CCP and dismissed from public office.

On 13 July 2026, Zhou was sentenced to 14 years and fined 4 million yuan for bribery.

Government offices
Preceded by Chen Wenhao	Mayor of Changde; 2013–2017	Succeeded by Cao Lijun
Party political offices
Preceded by Wang Qun	Communist Party Secretary of Changde; 2017–2021	Succeeded by Yang Yiwen
Preceded by Chen Zhemin	Head of the Publicity Department of Tianjin Municipal Committee of the Chinese Communist Party; 2021–2022	Succeeded by Shen Lei
Preceded by Yu Yunlin	Head of the Organization Department of Tianjin Municipal Committee of the Chinese Communist Party; 2022–2025	Succeeded by Guo Yonghong
