= Tong Mingqian =

Chinese politician (born 1958)

- 童名谦

Vice Chairman of the Hunan Provincial Committee of the Chinese People's Political Consultative Conference
- In office January 2013 – December 2013
- Leader: Chen Qiufa (chairman)

Communist Party Secretary of Hengyang
- In office February 2012 – April 2013
- Preceded by: Zhang Wenxiong
- Succeeded by: Li Yilong

Communist Party Secretary of Shaoyang
- In office March 2008 – February 2012
- Preceded by: Huang Tianci
- Succeeded by: Guo Guangwen

Party Secretary of Xiangxi Tujia and Miao Autonomous Prefecture
- In office February 2003 – March 2008
- Preceded by: Peng Duixi
- Succeeded by: He Zezhong

Personal details
- Born: June 23, 1958 (age 68) Baoqing County, Heilongjiang, China
- Party: Chinese Communist Party (1979–2014; expelled)
- Relations: Tong Mingrang (sister)
- Education: Central Party School of the Chinese Communist Party; Hunan University

Chinese name
- Traditional Chinese: 童名謙
- Simplified Chinese: 童名谦
Transcriptions
Standard Mandarin
- Hanyu Pinyin: Tóng Míngqiān

Tong Mingqian (Chinese: 童名谦; pinyin: Tóng Míngqiān; born June 23, 1958) is a former Chinese politician. At the height of his political career he served as the Communist Party Secretary of the cities of Shaoyang and Hengyang, before becoming the vice-chairman of the Hunan Provincial Committee of the Chinese People's Political Consultative Conference, a largely ceremonial legislative consultation body. He was removed from office in December 2013 and placed under investigation by the Communist Party's anti-graft agency.

Tong, as party chief of Hengyang, was the top official in charge of the overseeing the elections of delegates to the provincial People's Congress from the city in late 2012 and early 2013. Local media reported that several dozen delegates attempted to exchange money for votes during the municipal People's Congress. Tong was deemed to have been negligent during the process, having "failed to conduct a thorough investigation on election abuses". Tong was dismissed from all his posts and expelled from the Communist Party in 2014. He was convicted on charges of dereliction of duty, and sentenced to five years to prison.

== Biography ==
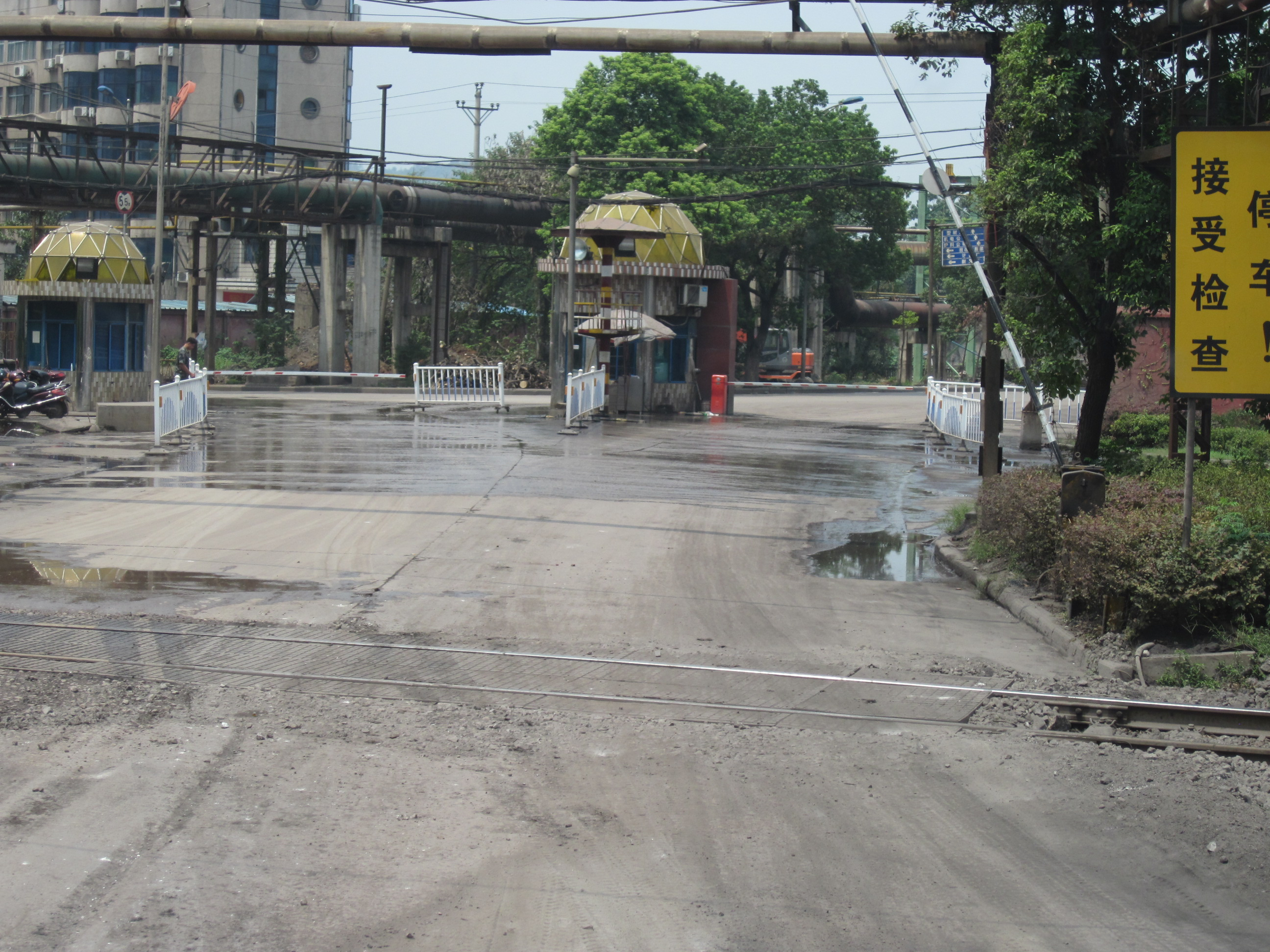
Lianyuan Steel.

Tong was born in Baoqing County, Heilongjiang on June 23, 1958, which traces his ancestry to Changsha, Hunan.

Tong became involved in politics in October 1975 and he joined the Chinese Communist Party in April 1979. During the Cultural Revolution, Tong worked at Bawuer Farm in Heilongjiang between October 1975 to October 1980. In November 1980, Tong was transferred to Lianyuan to work as an officer at Lianyuan Steel.

In December 1983, Tong was promoted to become the Deputy Party Secretary of Loudi, a position he held until December 1986.

In January 1987, he was appointed the Director of the Hunan provincial party Propaganda Department, he remained in that position until February 1988, when he was appointed the director of the General Office of the Hunan Party Committee. Tong received his Master of Engineering degree from Hunan University in December 1993.

Tong served as the head of Hunan provincial party Communications Department between November 1991 to July 1993, the Deputy Secretary of the Communist Youth League provincial organization between July 1993 to August 1997. In August 1997, Tong was transferred to Xiangxi Tujia and Miao Autonomous Prefecture as the a Standing Committee member of Xiangxi Tujia and Miao Autonomous Prefecture and the head of the Xiangxi Tujia and Miao Autonomous Prefecture Organization Department. In September 2000, Tong was appointed as the Deputy Secretary of Xiangxi Tujia and Miao Autonomous Prefecture; he then was promoted to Party Secretary in February 2003.

Tong served as the Party Secretary of Shaoyang between March 2008 to February 2012, and the Party Secretary of Hengyang between February 2012 to April 2013. In January 2013, Tong was elected as the vice-chairman of the Hunan Provincial Committee of the Chinese People's Political Consultative Conference, a largely ceremonial legislative consultation body.

=== Hengyang vote-buying scandal ===
In December 2012, the Hengyang Municipal People's Congress convened to elect 73 allotted delegates to the upcoming provincial People's Congress (legislature). According to Hunan provincial media, during the elections process, some 56 candidates attempted to buy votes from the municipal congress members, exchanging goods and cash worth a total monetary value of some 110 million yuan ($17.7 million). Tong, as Hengyang party chief, was the top official overseeing the election process. During the process, it was said that some 518 out of 527 delegates to the municipal congress and 68 congress staff members accepted or received cash or gifts. The scale of the vote-buying scheme earned the scandal significant notoriety nationally, and was said to have been the most serious vote buying scheme since the communist state was founded in 1949.

On December 18, 2013, Tong was placed under investigation by the Central Commission for Discipline Inspection for "serious violations of laws and regulations". Several days later, Tong was dismissed from his position as vice-chairman of the Hunan Provincial Committee of the Chinese People's Political Consultative Conference. On January 2, 2014, Tong was expelled from the Chinese Communist Party (CCP), then taken into custody for judicial proceedings. Tong's case is unique compared to other officials who have been accused of corruption since the 18th Party Congress in that the initial investigation did not explicitly state Tong was involved in the scandal itself, but only that he was negligent. This contrasted with other fallen officials who were accused of actively taking bribes or abuse of power. Nevertheless, after the CCDI's investigation concluded, Tong was said to have broken the law and his case was forwarded to prosecution authorities for further processing.

Tong's case sent a signal that "turning a blind eye" to abuses can result in just as severe of discipline as actively engaging in abuses. Tong was charged with dereliction of duty by the Beijing Intermediate Procuratorate in August 2014. Specifically, the prosecution asserted that Tong had been informed about the vote-buying scheme from four separate delegates at the municipal congress but consciously avoided conducting an investigation. The facts of the case mentioned, however, that Tong held several election preparatory committee meetings which paid lip service to following election laws and regulations generally, but did not discuss any specific abuses. On August 18, 2014, Tong was sentenced to five years in prison by the Second Intermediate People's Court in Beijing. Tong did not appeal the decision. The Court said that the sentence took into account Tong's cooperative attitude during judicial proceedings and his admission of guilt which presumably reduced the severity of his sentence.

On June 4, 2018, Tong was reduced penalty for 6 months, and he was released from prison on June 30. He became the first official of sub-provincial rank to be released following the ascension of Xi Jinping at the 18th National Congress of the Chinese Communist Party.

== Personal life ==
Tong Mingqian has a sister, Mingrang (童名让), who is a senior official of the Hunan Development and Reform Commission, an agency with broad powers over the provincial economy.

Party political offices
Preceded by Sun Zaitian	Head of Organization Department of Xiangxi Tujia and Miao Autonomous Prefecture Committee of the Chinese Communist Party; 1997–2000	Succeeded by Zhang Jianwen
Preceded by Peng Duixi (彭对喜)	Communist Party Secretary of Xiangxi Tujia and Miao Autonomous Prefecture; 2003–2008	Succeeded by He Zezhong (何泽中)
Preceded by Huang Tianci (黄天赐)	Communist Party Secretary of Shaoyang; 2008–2012	Succeeded by Guo Guangwen (郭光文)
Preceded by Zhang Wenxiong	Communist Party Secretary of Hengyang; 2012–2013	Succeeded by Li Yilong
