= Dai Daojin =

Chinese politician

- 戴道晋

Vice Chairman of the Hunan Provincial Committee of the Chinese People's Political Consultative Conference
- In office January 2017 – 28 January 2021
- Chairman: Li Weiwei

Vice Governor of Hunan
- In office November 2014 – May 2017
- Governor: Du Jiahao; Xu Dazhe

Personal details
- Born: February 1957 (age 69) Hanshou County, Hunan, China
- Party: Chinese Communist Party (1975–2024; expelled)
- Education: China Youth University of Political Studies; Hunan University

Chinese name
- Simplified Chinese: 戴道晋
- Traditional Chinese: 戴道晉
Transcriptions
Standard Mandarin
- Hanyu Pinyin: Dài Dàojìn

Dai Daojin (Chinese: 戴道晋; born February 1957) is a former Chinese politician who spent his entire career in his home-province Hunan. He joined the Chinese Communist Party (CCP) in December 1975, and began his political career in December 1977. He was investigated by China's top anti-graft agency in January 2024. Previously he served as vice chairman of the Hunan Provincial Committee of the Chinese People's Political Consultative Conference and before that, vice governor of Hunan.

== Early life and education ==
Dai was born in Hanshou County, Hunan, in February 1957. In August 1984, he was accepted to the China Youth University of Political Studies. He obtained his MBA from Hunan University in December 1998.

== Career ==
He became an official in Hantai People's Commune in December 1977, and soon in October 1978 was transferred to the Organization Department of the CCP Hanshou County Committee. In February 1983, he was elevated to deputy secretary of Hanshou County Committee of the Communist Youth League of China.

Starting in September 1986, he served in several posts in the Organization Department of the CCP Hunan Provincial Committee, including deputy department level organizer, chief department member, deputy director of the Office, and director of the Office.

In June 2000, he was transferred to Zixing, a county-level city under the administration of Chenzhou prefecture-level City. The region abounds with coal. He was appointed party secretary of Zixing and was admitted to member of the CCP Chenzhou Municipal Committee, the city's top authority. In June 2002, he became vice mayor of Chenzhou, rising to mayor in March 2004. In November 2008, he rose to become party secretary, the top political position in the city.

He was secretary-general and party branch secretary of the Hunan Provincial People's Government in March 2012, in addition to serving as director-general of the General Office. He was appointed vice governor in November 2014. He was chosen as vice chairman of the Hunan Provincial Committee of the Chinese People's Political Consultative Conference in January 2017, and held that office until January 2021.

== Downfall ==
In January 2024, Dai was put under investigation for alleged "serious violations of discipline and laws" by the Central Commission for Discipline Inspection (CCDI), the party's internal disciplinary body, and the National Supervisory Commission, the highest anti-corruption agency of China. His superior Li Dalun in Chenzhou was also sacked for graft in May 2006. And both his predecessor Zhou Zhengkun and successor Xiang Lili in Chenzhou had been investigated in May 2007 and in May 2019, respectively. The four of them and other subordinates all designed a coal mine corruption case. On July 31, he was expelled from the CCP.

On 26 March 2025, Dai stood trial at the Intermediate People's Court of Zhuhai on charges of taking bribes. The public prosecutors accused him of abusing his multiple positions between 2000 and 2024 in Hunan to seek favor on behalf of certain organizations and individuals in enterprise management, project contracting, job adjustment and promotion, in return, he illegally accepted money and goods worth over 107 million yuan ($13.92 million), directly or through his relatives. On June 24, he was sentenced to death with a two-year reprieve for bribery by the Intermediate People's Court of Zhuhai. He was deprived of his political rights for life, and all his personal assets were confiscated.

Government offices
Preceded by Zhou Zhengkun	Mayor of Chenzhou; 2004–2008	Succeeded by Xiang Lili
Preceded by Sheng Maolin	Director of the General Office of the Hunan Provincial People's Government; 2011–2014	Succeeded by Shi Moujun
Preceded by Sheng Maolin	Secretary-General of the Hunan Provincial People's Government; 2012–2015	Succeeded by Xiang Lili
Party political offices
Preceded by Sheng Maolin	Communist Party Secretary of Zixing; 2000–2002	Succeeded by Huang Xiang'e
Preceded by Ge Hongyuan	Communist Party Secretary of Chenzhou; 2008–2011	Succeeded by Xiang Lili
