= Zhang Wenxiong =

Chinese politician

- 张文雄

Head of Publicity Department of CCP Hunan Provincial Committee
- In office August 2015 – November 2016
- Preceded by: Xu Yousheng
- Succeeded by: Cai Zhenhong

Secretary of the Working Committee of "Two Oriented Society" in Changsha, Zhuzhou and Xiangtan
- In office December 2011 – August 2015
- Preceded by: Chen Zhaoxiong
- Succeeded by: Lin Wu

Communist Party Secretary of Hengyang
- In office March 2008 – March 2013
- Preceded by: Xu Minghua
- Succeeded by: Tong Mingqian

Director of the General Office of the CCP Hunan Provincial Committee
- In office April 2007 – March 2008
- Preceded by: Yu Laishan
- Succeeded by: Yang Taibo

Communist Party Secretary of Huaihua
- In office March 2006 – April 2007
- Preceded by: Ouyang Bin
- Succeeded by: Liu Lianyu

Personal details
- Born: April 4, 1962 (age 64) Yueyang, Hunan
- Party: Chinese Communist Party (1984–2017; expelled)
- Spouse: Tu Aifang
- Education: Hunan Institute of Science and Technology; Hunan Normal University; Central South University; Central Party School of the Chinese Communist Party

Chinese name
- Simplified Chinese: 张文雄
- Traditional Chinese: 張文雄
Transcriptions
Standard Mandarin
- Hanyu Pinyin: Zhāng Wénxióng

Zhang Wenxiong (Chinese: 张文雄; born 4 April 1962) is a former Chinese politician, and head of the Propaganda Department of the Hunan Provincial Committee of the Chinese Communist Party. He was dismissed from his position in November 2016 for investigation by the Central Commission for Discipline Inspection.

== Career ==
Zhang Wenxiong was born in Yueyang, Hunan on 4 April 1962, and he was entered to Hunan Institute of Science and Technology in 1980 and graduated in 1982. Then he became the officer in Yueyang Education Bureau. From 1985 to 1994, he served in Yueyang County CCP Committee. In 1994, he transferred to Office of Hunan CCP Committee until 2001. In 2006 he became the Chinese Communist Party Committee Secretary of Huaihua, and transferred to Hengyang in 2011. In 2011, he was elected as Member of the Hunan Provincial Committee of the Chinese Communist Party. Zhang became the head of the committee's Propaganda Department in August 2015.

== Downfall ==
On November 8, 2016, Chen Shulong was placed under investigation by the CCP's Central Commission for Discipline Inspection, the party's internal disciplinary body, for "serious violations of regulations". Zhang was expelled from the CCP on February 27, 2017.

On August 16, 2018, Zhang was sentenced to 15 years in prison for taking bribes worth 23.35 million yuan and unidentified 51.58 million yuan property in Guilin People's Intermediate Court.

== Personal life ==
Zhang married Tu Aifang (涂爱芳), a businesswoman who accompanied him from Huaihua to Hengyang and used Zhang's power to undertake projects all the way. In Zhang's hometown of Yueyang, a company without sand mining qualification in which Tu held a stake had a sand mining sales amount of nearly 1 billion yuan ($156 million) in nine months, while Tu and her partners had a total profit of more than 300 million yuan ($46.8 million).

Party political offices
Preceded by Yuan Jianyao	Director of Policy Research Office of CCP Hunan Provincial Committee; 2003–2006	Succeeded by Duan Linyi
Preceded by Ouyang Bin	Communist Party Secretary of Huaihua; 2006–2007	Succeeded by Liu Lianyu
Previous: Xu Minghua	Communist Party Secretary of Hengyang; 2008–2013	Next: Tong Mingqian
Preceded by Chen Zhaoxiong	Secretary of the Working Committee of "Two Oriented Society" in Changsha, Zhuzhou and Xiangtan; 2011–2015	Succeeded by Lin Wu
Preceded by Xu Yousheng	Head of Publicity Department of CCP Hunan Provincial Committee; 2015–2016	Succeeded by Cai Zhenhong
