= Yin Yuying =

Yin Yuying may refer to:

- Yin Yuying or Empress Yin (Liu Song)
- Yin Yuying (politician)
