= 5th Golden Eagle Awards =

Chinese TV awards ceremony in 1987

The 5th Golden Eagle Awards were held April 25, 1987, in Xi'an, Shanxi province. Nominees and winners are listed below, winners are in bold.

== Best Television Series ==
not awarded this year

- Triumph in Midnight 凯旋在子夜
- Dream in Red Mansions 红楼梦
- Begonia 秋海棠

== Best Mini-series ==
not awarded this year

- Afloat in Changjiang 长江第一飘
- Understanding 理解万岁
- One Foot Champion 独脚冠军
- Under the Tree 大树底下

== Best Lead Actor in a Television Series ==
- Shi Zhaoqi for Triumph in Midnight

== Best Lead Actress in a Television Series ==
- Zhu Lin for Triumph in Midnight

== Best Supporting Actor in a Television Series ==
- Wang Qun for Zhen San

== Best Supporting Actress in a Television Series ==
- Deng Jie for Dream in Red Mansions

== Best Dubbing Actor ==
- Zheng Jun for Sergeant Paris

== Best Dubbing Actress ==
- Liu Guangning for Rage of Angels
