= Weightlifting at the 1959 National Games of China =

Weightlifting was part of the first National Games of China held in Beijing. Only men competed in seven bodyweight categories which mostly mirrored the international standard at the time. In 1959 the Chinese Weightlifting Association was not yet a member federation of the IWF.

The competition program at the National Games mirrors that of the Olympic Games as only medals for the total achieved are awarded, but not for individual lifts in either the snatch or clean and jerk. Likewise an athlete failing to register a snatch result cannot advance to the clean and jerk.

== Medal summary ==
=== Men ===
| Event | Gold | | Silver | | Bronze | |
|---|---|---|---|---|---|---|
| 56 kg | Chen Jingkai; Guangdong | 320 kg | Li Jiyuan; PLA | 302.5 kg | Xue Deming; Shanghai | 300 kg |
| 60 kg | You Jiadong; Inner Mongolia | 317.5 kg | Yang Zhaoquan; PLA | 315 kg | Yu Zhuquan; Guangdong | 305 kg |
| 67.5 kg | Huang Qianghui; Heilongjiang | 370 kg | Xu Honglin; Jiangsu | 357.5 kg | Huang Huicheng; Shanghai | 342.5 kg |
| 75 kg | Shu Gang; Guangdong | 375 kg | Peng Guofu; PLA | 372.5 kg | Zhu Hongquan; Shanghai | 372.5 kg |
| 82.5 kg | Zhao Qingkui; Hebei | 415 kg | Jiang Guanghong; Anhui | 375 kg | Qu Bingyu; Shanghai | 365 kg |
| 90 kg | Li Baiyu; Sichuan | 437.5 kg | Xie Yanfa; PLA | 390 kg | Wu Shaoliang; Guangdong | 365 kg |
| 100 kg | Chang Guanqun; Shanghai | 395 kg | Han Laixiang; PLA | 390 kg | Wang Lijun; Hebei | 375 kg |

== Medal table ==
| Rank | Delegation | Gold | Silver | Bronze | Total |
|---|---|---|---|---|---|
| 1 | Guangdong | 2 | 0 | 2 | 4 |
| 2 | Shanghai | 1 | 0 | 4 | 5 |
| 3 | Hebei | 1 | 0 | 1 | 2 |
| 4 | Heilongjiang | 1 | 0 | 0 | 1 |
| 4 | Inner Mongolia | 1 | 0 | 0 | 1 |
| 4 | Sichuan | 1 | 0 | 0 | 1 |
| 7 | People's Liberation Army | 0 | 5 | 0 | 5 |
| 8 | Anhui | 0 | 1 | 0 | 1 |
| 8 | Jiangsu | 0 | 1 | 0 | 1 |
| Totals (9 entries) | | 7 | 7 | 7 | 21 |
