= Xiang Lili =

Chinese politician

- 向力力

Vice-Chairman of the Standing Committee of Hunan Provincial People's Congress
- In office January 2018 – July 2019
- Chairman: Du Jiahao

Vice-Governor of Hunan
- In office May 2016 – January 2018
- Governor: Du Jiahao→Xu Dazhe

Secretary-General of Hunan
- In office April 2015 – December 2016
- Preceded by: Dai Daojin
- Succeeded by: Yang Guangrong

Communist Party Secretary of Chenzhou
- In office December 2011 – April 2015
- Preceded by: Dai Daojin
- Succeeded by: Yi Pengfei

Mayor of Chenzhou
- In office August 2008 – December 2011
- Preceded by: Dai Daojin
- Succeeded by: Qu Hai

Personal details
- Born: September 1962 (age 63) Hengdong County, Hunan, China
- Party: Chinese Communist Party (expelled; November 1984-September 2019)
- Education: Xiangtan University; Hunan University

Xiang Lili (Chinese: 向力力; pinyin: Xiàng Lìlì; born September 1962) is a former Chinese politician who spent his entire career in his home-province Hunan. As of May 2019 he was under investigation by China's top anti-corruption agency. Previously he served as vice-chairman of the Standing Committee of Hunan Provincial People's Congress. Prior to that, he was vice-governor of Hunan (2016–2018), secretary general of Hunan (2015–2016), mayor and Chinese Communist Party Committee Secretary of Chenzhou (2008–2015), head of Hunan Provincial Commerce Department (2008-2008), and vice-mayor and executive vice-mayor of Changsha (1998–2007).

== Education ==
Xiang was born in Hengdong County, Hunan, in September 1962. His father once served as magistrate of Hedong County. After the resumption of college entrance examination, in September 1979, he was accepted to Xiangtan University, where he majored in history.

== Career ==
After graduating in July 1983, he was dispatched to the government of his home-county. In May 1986, he was transferred to Shenzhen, a newly established special economic zone, and appointed director of the Shenzhen Office of Hunan Provincial People's Government. In December 1988, he was transferred to Changsha, capital of Hunan province, and appointed secretary of Secretariat of General Office of the Hunan Provincial Committee of the Chinese Communist Party. He was Chinese Communist Party Deputy Committee Secretary of Lengshuitan in July 1997, but having held the position for only two years. In September 1993, he was transferred to Changsha again and appointed secretary general of CCP Changsha Municipal Committee. After a year as party chief of the West District of Changsha, he was appointed party chief of newly established Yuelu District in July 1996. In June 1998 he became vice-mayor of Changsha, and then executive vice-mayor, in September 2006. In November 2007 he became the deputy head of Hunan Provincial Commerce Department, rising to the head position the next year. He served as deputy party chief of Chenzhou in August 2008, and three years later promoted to the party chief position. He became secretary general of Hunan in April 2015, and concurrently served as vice-governor in May 2016. He was vice-chairman of the Standing Committee of Hunan Provincial People's Congress in January 2018, a position he held for only a year.

== Investigation ==
On May 17, 2019, he was put under investigation for alleged "serious violations of discipline and laws" by the Central Commission for Discipline Inspection (CCDI), the party's internal disciplinary body, and the National Supervisory Commission, the highest anti-corruption agency of China. He expelled from the CCP and removed from public office on 7 September. He was detained on 23 September. On June 12, 2020, the court found Xiang guilty on all counts, including consorting with some private enterprise owners and using his power and influence to seek benefits for them, trading power for money unscrupulously, accepting a huge amount of money and gifts, and sentenced him to 15 years in prison. The court also confiscated six million yuan of his personal assets and ordered him to hand in money gained from bribes.

Xiang had a long-term working relationship with Qin Guangrong beginning in 1991, sharing stints in Lingling and Changsha. Just a week before Xiang Lili's stepped down, Qin Guangrong, former party chief of Yunnan, turned himself in to the government and was placed under investigation.

== Personal life ==
Xiang has a younger brother named Xiang Mingming (向明明), who is a businessman.

Government offices
Preceded by Mao Xubao (毛叙保)	Head of Hunan Provincial Commerce Department; 2008-2008	Succeeded by Liu Jie (刘捷)
Preceded by Dai Daojin	Mayor of Chenzhou; 2008-2011	Succeeded by Qu Hai (瞿海)
Preceded by Dai Daojin	Secretary General of Hunan; 2015-2016	Succeeded by Yang Guangrong (杨光荣)
Party political offices
Preceded by Position established	Communist Party Secretary of Yuelu District; 1995-1998	Succeeded by Xie Jianhui (谢建辉)
Preceded by Dai Daojin	Communist Party Secretary of Chenzhou; 2011-2015	Succeeded by Yi Pengfei
