= Mao Tengfei =

Chinese politician

- 毛腾飞

Head of Hunan Provincial Department of Industry and Information Technology
- In office May 2021 – May 2022
- Preceded by: Cao Huiquan
- Succeeded by: Lei Shaoye

Personal details
- Born: October 1962 (age 63–64) Wugang, Hunan, China
- Party: Chinese Communist Party (1991–2022; expelled)
- Education: Hunan Normal University; Central South University

Chinese name
- Simplified Chinese: 毛腾飞
- Traditional Chinese: 毛騰飛
Transcriptions
Standard Mandarin
- Hanyu Pinyin: Máo Téngfēi

Mao Tengfei (Chinese: 毛腾飞; born October 1962) is a former Chinese politician who his entire career in his home-province Hunan. He turned himself in and is cooperating with the Central Commission for Discipline Inspection (CCDI) and National Commission of Supervision for investigation of "suspected violations of disciplines and laws" in November 2022. Previously he served as vice chairperson of the Economic Science and Technology Committee of the Hunan Provincial Committee of the Chinese People's Political Consultative Conference and before that, head of the Hunan Provincial Department of Industry and Information Technology.

== Early life and education ==
Mao was born in Wugang, Hunan, in October 1962. After resuming the college entrance examination, in 1979, he was accepted to Hunan Normal University, where he majored in mathematics. After University, he taught at Wugang No. 2 High School. He did his postgraduate work at Changsha Railway University (now Central South University Railway Campus) from 1985 to 1987. He also studied at Old Dominion University between October 2006 and April 2007.

== Political career ==
Mao got involved in politics in July 1987, when he became an official in the Shaoyang Municipal Planning Commission. He joined the Chinese Communist Party (CCP) in November 1991. In March 1993, he was transferred to Changsha, capital of Hunan province. He served in various posts in Hunan Provincial Planning Commission before serving as chief economist of the Hunan Provincial Development and Reform Commission in April 2004. He rose to become deputy director in November 2005.

Mao was appointed executive vice mayor of Xiangtan in November 2007 and was admitted to member of the Standing Committee of the CCP Xiangtan Municipal Committee, the city's top authority.

In November 2010, Mao was transferred to southeast Hunan's Chenzhou city and appointed deputy party secretary.

Mao was deputy party secretary of Zhuzhou in March 2013, in addition to serving as mayor since May that same year. In March 2016, he was made party secretary, his first foray into a prefectural leadership role. He concurrently served as chairman of Zhuzhou Municipal People's Congress since January 2017.

Mao was appointed party branch secretary of the Hunan Provincial Department of Industry and Information Technology on 18 April 2021, concurrently serving as head since May 25.

In May 2022, Mao took office as was chosen as vice chairperson of the Economic Science and Technology Committee of the Hunan Provincial Committee of the Chinese People's Political Consultative Conference.

== Investigation ==
On 12 November 2022, Mao surrendered himself to the Central Commission for Discipline Inspection (CCDI) and National Commission of Supervision for investigation of "suspected violations of disciplines and laws". He was expelled from the CCP and downgraded to fourth level chief staff member (四级主任科员).

Government offices
Preceded by Wang Qun	Mayor of Zhuzhou; 2013–2016	Succeeded by Yang Weiguo
Preceded by Cao Huiquan	Head of Hunan Provincial Department of Industry and Information Technology; 2021–2022	Succeeded by Lei Shaoye
Party political offices
Preceded by He Anjie	Communistparty secretary of Zhuzhou; 2016–2021	Succeeded by Cao Huiquan
Assembly seats
Preceded by Liu Liliang (刘力量)	Chairman of Zhuzhou Municipal People's Congress; 2017–2021	Succeeded by Cao Huiquan
