= Yang Yiwen =

Chinese politician

- 杨懿文

Communist Party Secretary of Changde
- In office April 2021 – November 2021
- Preceded by: Zhou Derui
- Succeeded by: Cao Zhiqiang

Mayor of Loudi
- In office April 2016 – April 2021
- Preceded by: Li Jianguo
- Succeeded by: Zeng Chaoqun

Personal details
- Born: July 1966 (age 60) Miluo County, Yueyang, China
- Party: Chinese Communist Party (1991–2022)
- Spouse: Li Xiangjiang
- Relations: Yang Wenli
- Education: Changsha University; Wuhan University

Chinese name
- Simplified Chinese: 杨懿文
- Traditional Chinese: 楊懿文
Transcriptions
Standard Mandarin
- Hanyu Pinyin: Yáng Yìwén

Yang Yiwen (Chinese: 杨懿文; born July 1966) is a former Chinese politician who spent most of his career in his home-province Hunan. He was investigated by Chinese Communist Party's Central Commission for Discipline Inspection in November 2021. Previously he served as CCP committee secretary of Changde. He is a delegate to the 13th National People's Congress.

== Biography ==
Yang was born in Miluo County, Yueyang, in July 1966. In 1984, he was admitted to Changsha University, where he met his wife Li Xiangjiang. After graduation in 1987, he became an officer in Changsha Public Security Bureau. Since June 1990, he successively worked in the General Office of CCP Changsha Municipal Committee, Changsha Investment Promotion Bureau, Changsha Foreign Trade Bureau, and Changsha Commerce Bureau. He joined the Chinese Communist Party (CCP) in June 1991. He became magistrate of Changsha County, a county under the jurisdiction of Changsha, in October 2007, and then party secretary, the top political position in the county, beginning in January 2009. In April 2016, he was named acting mayor of Loudi, replacing Li Jianguo. He was installed as mayor in the following month. In April 2021, he was transferred to Changde and rose to become party secretary, a position he held for only seven months.

=== Downfall ===
On 18 November 2021, he has been placed under investigation for "serious violations of discipline and laws" by the Central Commission for Discipline Inspection (CCDI), the party's internal disciplinary body, and the National Supervisory Commission, the highest anti-corruption agency of China.

On 12 May 2022, he was expelled from the CCP and dismissed from public office. He was taken away by the Hunan Provincial People's Procuratorate on June 2.

On 23 March 2023, he received a sentence of 16 years and 6 months in prison and fine of 3.5 million yuan for taking bribes by the Zhuzhou Intermediate People's Court. Yang's illegal gains will be confiscated and his case transferred to the judiciary.

== Personal life ==
His wife Li Xiangjiang (李湘江), deputy party secretary and deputy director of Changsha Public Security Bureau, has come under investigation on the same day. His younger sister Yang Wenli (杨文利), former director of Human Resources Department of Changsha Radio and Television Station, was put under investigation the next day.

Government offices
Preceded by Li Jianguo	Mayor of Loudi; 2016–2021	Succeeded by Zeng Chaoqun
Party political offices
Preceded by Zhou Derui	Communist Party Secretary of Changde; 2021	Succeeded by Cao Zhiqiang
