= Wang Qun (politician, born 1961) =

Chinese politician

- 王群

Secretary-General of Hunan Provincial People's Government
- In office March 2017 – July 2021
- Governor: Xu Dazhe
- Preceded by: Yang Guangrong
- Succeeded by: Deng Qunce

Personal details
- Born: June 1961 (age 65) Yuanjiang County, Hunan, China
- Party: Chinese Communist Party
- Education: Central Party School of the Chinese Communist Party

Wang Qun (Chinese: 王群; pinyin: Wáng Qún; born June 1961) is a former Chinese politician who spent his entire career in central China's Hunan province. He was investigated by China's top anti-graft agency in April 2023. Previously, he served as a counsellor of Hunan Provincial People's Government. He was a delegate to the 12th National People's Congress.

== Early life and education ==
Wang was born in Yuanjiang County (now Yuanjiang), Hunan, in June 1961. After resuming the college entrance examination, in 1979, he entered Tianxin Railway Technical School, where he majored in machine manufacturing.

== Career ==
After graduating in 1981, Wang was despatched as a technician to Zhuzhou Electric Locomotive Works, where he was promoted to deputy director of the Office in January 1988 and to director in September 1985. He joined the Chinese Communist Party (CCP) in October 1987.

Wang began his political career in February 1996, when he was appointed deputy secretary-general of Zhuzhou Municipal People's Government and director and deputy party branch secretary of the Government Office. He was appointed party secretary of Shifeng District in February 2000, and seven months later was admitted as a member of the CCP Zhuzhou Municipal Committee, the city's top authority. He was party secretary of Tianyuan District in November 2000, in addition to serving as secretary of the Party Working Committee of Zhuzhou High-tech Zone. He was secretary of Zhuzhou Municipal Commission for Discipline Inspection in July 2005 and subsequently executive vice mayor in December 2006. In May 2008, he was named acting mayor of Zhuzhou, confirmed in January 2009. He also served as deputy party secretary.

Wang was appointed party secretary of Changde in March 2013, concurrently serving as chairman of Changde Municipal People's Congress since January 2017.

In March 2017, Wang was transferred to the capital city Changsha and appointed secretary-general of Hunan Provincial People's Government and also party branch secretary of the Government Office, serving in the posts until his retirement in July 2021. Then he was recruited as a counselor of Hunan Provincial People's Government.

== Downfall ==
On 2 April 2023, Wang was put under investigation for alleged "serious violations of discipline and laws" by the Central Commission for Discipline Inspection (CCDI), the party's internal disciplinary body, and the National Supervisory Commission, the highest anti-corruption agency of China.

Government offices
| Preceded by Chen Junwen | Mayor of Zhuzhou; 2008–2013 | Succeeded by Mao Tengfei |
| Preceded by Yang Guangrong | Secretary-General of Hunan Provincial People's Government; 2017–2021 | Succeeded by Deng Qunce |
Party political offices
| Preceded by Qing Jianwei | Communist Party Secretary of Changde; 2013–2017 | Succeeded by Zhou Derui |
