= Ye Hongzhuan =

Chinese politician

- 叶红专

Vice Chairperson of the Standing Committee of the Hunan Provincial People's Congress
- In office January 2018 – January 2022
- Chairperson: Du Jiahao

Communist Party Secretary of Xiangxi Tujia and Miao Autonomous Prefecture
- In office January 2013 – March 2021
- Deputy: Guo Jianqun → Long Xiaohua (Governor)
- Preceded by: He Zezhong
- Succeeded by: Guo Zhenggui

Governor of Xiangxi Tujia and Miao Autonomous Prefecture
- In office December 2008 – February 2013
- Leader: He Zezhong (Party Secretary)
- Preceded by: Xu Keqin
- Succeeded by: Guo Jianqun

Personal details
- Born: June 1958 (age 68) Longshan County, Hunan, China
- Party: Chinese Communist Party (1976-2026, expelled)
- Education: Hunan Open University

Chinese name
- Simplified Chinese: 叶红专
- Traditional Chinese: 葉紅專
Transcriptions
Standard Mandarin
- Hanyu Pinyin: Yè Hóngzhuān

Ye Hongzhuan (Chinese: 叶红专; born June 1958) is a retired Chinese politician of Tujia ethnicity who spent his entire career in his home-province Hunan. As of December 2025 he was under investigation by China's top anti-graft watchdog. Previously he served as vice chairperson of the Standing Committee of the Hunan Provincial People's Congress.

Ye was an alternate member of the 18th Central Committee of the Chinese Communist Party.

== Early life and education ==
Ye was born in June 1958 in Longshan County, Hunan. He graduated from Xiangxi Branch of Hunan Radio and Television University (now Hunan Open University) in 1987.

== Career ==
During the late Cultural Revolution, he was a sent-down youth in Xinglong People's Commune between March 1975 and October 1977. During that period, he joined the Chinese Communist Party (CCP) in December 1976. Then he became a staff member at the Longshan County Supply and Marketing Cooperative, and worked until February 1987.

Ye got involved in politics in February 1987, when he was appointed an official in the Longshan County Planning Committee, and was promoted to deputy director level section member in September 1988. He was deputy section chief of the Capital Construction Planning Section of the Xiangxi Tujia and Miao Autonomous Prefectural Planning Committee in May 1990, rising to section chief in August 1992. In September 1994, he became general manager of the Xiangxi Tujia and Miao Autonomous Prefectural Economic Construction Investment Company. A year later, in September 1995, he was transferred back to Xiangxi Prefectural Planning Committee (now Xiangxi Tujia and Miao Autonomous Prefectural Development and Planning Committee) as deputy director, and was promoted to director in May 2001. In April 2006, Ye was made party secretary of Fenghuang County. In November 2017, he was admitted to standing committee member of the CCP Xiangxi Tujia and Miao Autonomous Prefectural Committee, the prefecture's top authority. In May 2008, he was transferred to Jishou and appointed party secretary, the top political position in the city. In December 2008, he was named deputy party secretary and acting governor of Xiangxi Tujia and Miao Autonomous Prefecture, confirmed in March 2009. In January 2013, he was promoted again to party secretary, in addition to serving as vice chairperson of the Standing Committee of the Hunan Provincial People's Congress since January 2018. He retired in January 2022.

== Investigation ==
On 3 December 2025, Ye was suspected of "serious violations of laws and regulations" by the Central Commission for Discipline Inspection (CCDI), the party's internal disciplinary body, and the National Supervisory Commission, the highest anti-corruption agency of China. Ye was expelled from the party on 5 June 2026.

Party political offices
Preceded by Liu Changgang (刘昌刚)	Communist Party Secretary of Fenghuang County; 2006–2007	Succeeded by Zhang Yongzhong (张永忠)
Preceded by Peng Wuchang (彭武长)	Communist Party Secretary of Jishou; 2007–2008	Succeeded by Qin Guowen
Preceded by He Zezhong	Communist Party Secretary of Xiangxi Tujia and Miao Autonomous Prefecture; 2013–2021	Succeeded by Guo Zhenggui
Government offices
Preceded by Xu Keqin	Governor of Xiangxi Tujia and Miao Autonomous Prefecture; 2008–2013	Succeeded by Guo Jianqun
