= Politics of Huaihua =

Siasa za Huaihua mkoani Hunan nchini Uchina zaendelezwa kwa vyama viwili

The Politics of Huaihua in Hunan province in the People's Republic of China is structured in a dual party-government system like all other governing institutions in mainland China.

The Mayor of Huaihua is the highest-ranking official in the People's Government of Huaihua or Huaihua Municipal Government. However, in the city's dual party-government governing system, the Mayor has less power than the Huaihua Municipal Chinese Communist Party Committee Secretary, colloquially termed the "CCP Party Chief of Huaihua" or "Communist Party Secretary of Huaihua".

== History ==
In March 2016, Li Yilong was investigated by the Central Commission for Discipline Inspection.

== List of mayors of Huaihua ==
No.	English name	Chinese name	Took office	Left office	Notes
1	Wu Zongyuan	吴宗源	May 1998	April 2000	
2	Chen Zhiqiang	陈志强	May 2000	February 2001	Acting
3	Chen Zhiqiang	陈志强	February 2001	September 2006	
4	Li Yilong	李亿龙	September 2006	January 2007	Acting
5	Li Yilong	李亿龙	January 2007	July 2008	
6	Yi Pengfei	易鹏飞	July 2008	January 2009	Acting
7	Yi Pengfei	易鹏飞	January 2009	June 2011	
8	Li Hui	李晖	June 2011	January 2012	Acting
9	Li Hui	李晖	January 2012	June 2014	
10	Zhao Yingyun	赵应云	July 2014	December 2014	Acting
11	Zhao Yingyun	赵应云	December 2014	December 2017	
12	Lei Shaoye	雷绍业	December 2017	January 2018	Acting
12	Lei Shaoye	雷绍业	January 2018	March 2021	
13	Li Chunqiu	黎春秋	April 2021		

== List of CCP committee secretaries of Huaihua ==
No.	English name	Chinese name	Took office	Left office	Notes
1	Yang Taibo	杨泰波	April 1998	April 2000	
2	Ouyang Bin	欧阳斌	April 2000	March 2006	
3	Zhang Wenxiong	张文雄	March 2006	April 2007	
4	Liu Lianyu	刘莲玉	April 2007	March 2008	
5	Li Yilong	李亿龙	July 2008	March 2013	
6	Zhang Ziyin	张自银	March 2013	April 2014	
7	Peng Guofu	彭国甫	June 2014	March 2021	
8	Lei Shaoye	雷绍业	March 2021	April 2022	
9	Xu Zhongjian	许忠建	April 2022		

== See also ==
- Party Secretary of Hunan
