= Hunan University Press =

Chinese academic publisher

- Company type: National Key university press
- Founded: 1985; 41 years ago
- Headquarters: Hunan University, Yuelu District, Changsha, Hunan Province, China
- Products: Books, periodicals, audio-visual, digital products
- Website: press.hnu.edu.cn

Hunan University Press (simplified Chinese: 湖南大学出版社; traditional Chinese: 湖南大學出版社; pinyin: Húnán Dàxué Chūbǎnshè) is an academic publisher in Hunan Province of China. Founded in 1985, it is supervised by the Ministry of Education of the People's Republic of China and sponsored by Hunan University.

== History ==
In 1985, Hunan University Press was established on the campus by Hunan University.

In December 1989, it was discontinued.

In April 1995, it was restored and rebuilt.

In 2011, it was restructured into Hunan University Press Co., Ltd.

== Publication ==
Hunan University Press produces more than 1,200 book types each year, of which over 600 are new types and 70% are university textbooks and academic works. In addition, there are general reading materials and books of other categories.

== International cooperation ==
In November 2016, Hunan University Press and Japan Overseas Chinese News Agency entered into strategic cooperation.

The products of Hunan University Press are available both domestically and internationally.

== Honours ==
The company has won the "China Book Award", "China Excellent Publications Award", "Hunan Publishing Government Award", "National-level High-quality Textbooks for General Higher Education", "the First National Excellent Textbook Award", etc.

== See also ==
- Hunan University
- Hunan Normal University Press
