= Peng Guofu =

Chinese politician

- 彭国甫

Vice Chairperson of Hunan Provincial People's Congress
- In office January 2021 – January 2024
- Chairperson: Xu Dazhe; Zhang Qingwei; Shen Xiaoming

Vice Chairman of the Hunan Provincial Committee of the Chinese People's Political Consultative Conference
- In office January 2018 – 28 January 2021
- Chairperson: Li Weiwei

Personal details
- Born: January 1963 (age 63) Xiangxiang County, Hunan, China
- Party: Chinese Communist Party (1984–2024; expelled)
- Education: Xiangtan University; Hunan University

Chinese name
- Simplified Chinese: 彭国甫
- Traditional Chinese: 彭國甫
Transcriptions
Standard Mandarin
- Hanyu Pinyin: Péng Guófǔ

Peng Guofu (Chinese: 彭国甫; born January 1963) is a former Chinese university administrator and politician who spent his entire career in his home-province Hunan. As of January 2024 he was under investigation by China's top anti-corruption agency. Previously he served as vice chairperson of Hunan Provincial People's Congress and before that, vice chairman of the Hunan Provincial Committee of the Chinese People's Political Consultative Conference.

== Early life and education ==
Peng was born in Xiangxiang County (now Xiangxiang), Hunan, in January 1963. In 1980, he entered Xiangtan University, where he majored in philosophy.

After graduating in 1984, he stayed for teaching. He was appointed assistant president of Xiangtan University, in January 1996, becoming deputy party secretary in May 1998 and party secretary in April 2002. During his term in office, he obtained his PHD from Hunan University in January 2005.

== Political career ==
Peng joined the Chinese Communist Party (CCP) in June 1984, and got involved in politics in November 2008, when he was made deputy party secretary of Yueyang and party secretary of Yueyang County.

In September 2011 he succeeded Wang Kemin as head of the Hunan Provincial Science and Technology Department, serving in that position until 2014.

He was chosen as party secretary of Huaihua in June 2014, concurrently serving as chairperson of its People's Congress since December 2015. He concurrently served as vice chairman of the Hunan Provincial Committee of the Chinese People's Political Consultative Conference in January 2018 and vice chairperson of Hunan Provincial People's Congress in January 2021.

== Downfall ==
On 10 January 2024, Peng has been placed under investigation for "serious violations of laws and regulations" by the Central Commission for Discipline Inspection (CCDI), the party's internal disciplinary body, and the National Supervisory Commission, the highest anti-corruption agency of China. His subordinate Yao Shumin (姚述铭), head of the United Front Work Department of the CCP Huaihua Municipal and member of the CCP Huaihua Municipal Committee, was targeted after 20 days. On July 8, he was expelled from the CCP and dismissed from public office.

On 21 February 2025, Peng stood trial at the 1st Intermediate People's Court of Hainan on charges of taking bribes. Prosecutors accused him of taking advantage of his different positions in Hunan between 2004 and 2023 to seek profits for various companies and individuals in project contracting, enterprise management, job promotion. In return, he received bribes worth more than 134 million yuan. On May 27, he was sentenced to death with a two-year reprieve for bribery by the 1st Intermediate People's Court of Hainan. He was deprived of his political rights for life, and all his personal assets were confiscated.

Party political offices
Preceded by Shi Yaokun (石耀焜)	Communist Party Secretary of Xiangtan University; 2002–2008	Succeeded by Xiao Guo'an (肖国安)
Preceded by Tong Kangning (童康宁)	Communist Party Secretary of Yueyang County; 2008–2011	Succeeded by Li Siqing (黎四清)
Preceded by Zhang Ziyin	Communist Party Secretary of Huaihua; 2014–2021	Succeeded by Lei Shaoye
Government offices
Preceded by Wang Kemin	Head of the Hunan Provincial Science and Technology Department; 2011–2014	Succeeded by Tong Xudong (童旭东)
