= Zhou Benshun =

Chinese politician (born 1953)

- 周本顺

Party Secretary of Hebei
- In office 20 March 2013 – 31 July 2015
- Deputy: Zhang Qingwei (Governor); Zhao Yong (Deputy Secretary)
- Preceded by: Zhang Qingli
- Succeeded by: Zhao Kezhi

Secretary-General of the Central Political and Legal Affairs Commission
- In office 2007–2012
- Preceded by: Wang Shengjun
- Succeeded by: Wang Yongqing

Party Secretary of Shaoyang
- In office August 1995 – November 2000
- Preceded by: Sun Zaifu
- Succeeded by: Jiang Jianguo

Personal details
- Born: February 1953 (age 73) Xupu County, Hunan, China
- Party: Chinese Communist Party (expelled)
- Education: Changchun Institute of Geology; Hunan University; Wuhan University

Chinese name
- Traditional Chinese: 周本順
- Simplified Chinese: 周本顺
Transcriptions
Standard Mandarin
- Hanyu Pinyin: Zhōu Běnshùn

Zhou Benshun (Chinese: 周本顺; born February 1953) is a former Chinese politician. Between 2013 and 2015, he served as the Chinese Communist Party Committee Secretary and the top official of Hebei Province. Prior to his post in Hebei, Zhou Benshun was the Secretary-General of the Central Political and Legal Affairs Commission, serving under disgraced domestic security chief Zhou Yongkang.

On July 24, 2015, he was detained for investigation by the Central Commission for Discipline Inspection, then expelled from the party several months later. Zhou was the first incumbent provincial party secretary to be targeted by the Chinese government's anti-graft campaign since 2012.

== Career ==
Zhou Benshun was born in 1953 in Xupu County, Hunan province. He joined the Chinese Communist Party in September 1971.

From 1972 to 1975 Zhou attended Changchun Institute of Geology (now part of Jilin University) in Jilin province. After finishing university in December 1975, he taught at the Hunan School of Geology until 1985.

In January 1985, Zhou Benshun began working at the Policy Research Office of Hunan province, becoming its director in 1994. At the end of 1994 he was appointed Chinese Communist Party Deputy Committee Secretary of the prefecture-level city of Shaoyang, Hunan, rising to Chinese Communist Party Committee Secretary the following year. From 2000 to 2003 he was the Director of Public Security of Hunan province, i.e., the provincial police chief. A year later, Zhou entered the Hunan provincial Party Standing Committee as the head of the provincial Political and Legal Affairs Commission (Zhengfawei).

In November 2003 Zhou was transferred to the central government in Beijing to become the Deputy Secretary General of the Central Political and Legal Affairs Commission, working under Secretary General Wang Shengjun. In March 2008, Wang was promoted to President of the Supreme Court, and Zhou succeeded Wang as secretary general. For the next five years Zhou Benshun worked essentially as chief of staff to Zhou Yongkang (no relation), one of China's top leader (a member of the Politburo Standing Committee) who was then the head of the commission. During his Zhengfawei stint, Zhou served in a series of other roles, including leading the office of Xinjiang affairs, and deputy director of the Central Public Security Comprehensive Management Commission; he was seen as one of the leading figures of the Zhengfawei world and a trusted lieutenant of Zhou Yongkang.

In 2012, the son of Ling Jihua crashed in a Ferrari on one of Beijing's ring roads, unleashing highly unanticipated political consequences. Some overseas Chinese media reported that Zhou Benshun was dispatched to handle the fallout from the crash.

In March 2013, Zhou Benshun was appointed the party chief of Hebei province, replacing Zhang Qingli, who became Vice Chairman of the Chinese People's Political Consultative Conference. He was a member of the 18th Central Committee of the Chinese Communist Party.

== Investigation ==
As Zhou Benshun has been associated with Zhou Yongkang for much of his career, rumours swirled about Zhou Benshun's fate since the senior Zhou was investigated for corruption in 2014. Zhou reportedly became meek and low-profile, and deferred many decisions to Zhang Qingwei, governor of Hebei and his deputy, even for routine matters such as making closing statements at meetings.

Xi Jinping visited the Hebei party leadership in September 2013 to personally oversee a democratic life meeting where senior officials criticized each other and engaged in self-criticism. Footage of the event was shown on national television. That Xi would himself preside over a provincial-level meeting, put immense pressure on Zhou. At the September 2013 "life meeting", Zhou was criticized by his colleagues as lacking in competence, and as "too tolerant, too soft."

Over a year later, in December 2014, the Hebei party committee again held a democratic life meeting, in which Zhou lamented his own inability to realize the goals of the anti-corruption campaign in Hebei province, because he was afraid of upsetting the balance of organizations he oversaw. Fellow provincial standing committee member Jing Chunhua commented, "comrade Benshun needs to practice more democracy when making policy decisions." Liang Bin said that "comrade Benshun needs to pay more attention to issues concerning officials." Jing Chunhua and Liang Bin both eventually fell under the axe of the anti-corruption campaign.

On July 24, 2015, the Central Commission for Discipline Inspection, the Communist Party's top anti-corruption body, placed Zhou under investigation. Zhou was the first sitting provincial party leader to be placed under investigation since the anti-corruption campaign began after the 18th Party Congress. Earlier that day, Zhou attended a Beijing-Tianjin-Hebei integration conference hosted by Vice Premier Zhang Gaoli; he was detained shortly after the meeting ended. Zhou's downfall was extremely abrupt. Several days earlier Zhou had visited Beidaihe District, ostensibly to make preparations for the annual Beidaihe Conference of top Communist leaders.

Zhou's downfall was a significant political event; prior to Zhou, the removal of provincial-level party chiefs had only happened three times in post-Cultural Revolution history: Beijing party chief Chen Xitong in 1995, Shanghai party chief Chen Liangyu in 2006, and Chongqing party chief Bo Xilai in 2012. Former Hebei party chief Cheng Weigao (term 1993–1998) had also been disgraced, but not during his term as party chief.

On October 16, 2015, Zhou was expelled from the Communist Party. The investigation concluded that Zhou had voiced opinions contrary to the spirit of the policies of the party center, frequented private clubs, accepted bribes and leaked state secrets.

On February 15, 2017, Zhou was sentenced on 15 years in prison for taking bribes worth 40.01 million yuan (~$5.83 million) by the Intermediate People's Court in Xiamen.

== Political views ==
Zhou is known for his hard-line political views, generally expressing views that the law must be seen primarily as a means to keep society in order rather than as a means for citizens to seek fairness and justice. In a 2011 article published in Qiushi, Zhou described the concept of civil society as a "trap" being sold by Western countries. Zhou also said that China would never adopt "separation of powers". He said that the law must achieve a mix of "legal, social, and political results."

Party political offices
Previous: Sun Zaifu (孙载夫)	Party Secretary of Shaoyang; 1995-2000	Next: Jiang Jianguo (蒋建国)
Preceded by Zhang Qingli	Party Secretary of Hebei; 2013–2015	Succeeded by Zhao Kezhi
Preceded by Wang Shengjun	Secretary-General of the Central Political and Legal Affairs Commission; 2007–2012	Succeeded by Wang Yongqing
