= Yi Pengfei =

Chinese politician

- 易鹏飞

Vice Chairman of the Hunan Provincial Committee of the Chinese People's Political Consultative Conference
- In office January 2018 – February 2023
- Chairman: Li Weiwei; Mao Wanchun

Personal details
- Born: May 1962 (age 64) Yiyang, Hunan, China
- Party: Chinese Communist Party (expelled; 1987–2023)
- Education: Hunan University

Chinese name
- Simplified Chinese: 易鹏飞
- Traditional Chinese: 易鵬飛
Transcriptions
Standard Mandarin
- Hanyu Pinyin: Yì Péngfēi

Yi Pengfei (Chinese: 易鹏飞; born May 1962) is a former Chinese politician who spent his entire career in his home-province Hunan. He was investigated by China's top anti-graft agency in February 2023. Previously he served as vice chairman of the Hunan Provincial Committee of the Chinese People's Political Consultative Conference.

He was a representative of the 19th National Congress of the Chinese Communist Party.

== Early life and education ==
Yi was born in Yiyang, Hunan, in May 1962. After resuming the college entrance examination, in 1979, he was accepted to Hunan College of Finance and Economics (now Hunan University), where he majored in business economy.

== Political career ==
Yi entered politics in 1983, after college. He worked at the Finance and Trade Division of Hunan Provincial Planning Commission (later renamed Hunan Provincial Development Planning Commission) and over a period of 16 years worked his way up to the position of vice director in April 2000. He joined the Chinese Communist Party (CCP) in June 1987.

In June 2008, he was named acting mayor of Huaihua, confirmed in January 2009. He also served as deputy party secretary of the city.

In June 2011, he was assigned to the similar position in Loudi.

In March 2015, he was transferred to Chenzhou and appointed party secretary, the top political position in the city. He also served as chairman of the Chenzhou Municipal People's Congress from January 2017 to April 2021.

He was chosen as vice chairman of the Hunan Provincial Committee of the Chinese People's Political Consultative Conference in January 2018.

== Investigation ==
On 5 February 2023, he was put under investigation for alleged "serious violations of discipline and laws" by the Central Commission for Discipline Inspection (CCDI), the party's internal disciplinary body, and the National Supervisory Commission, the highest anti-corruption agency of China. In July 2023, he was expelled from the CCP and dismissed from public office. In August, he was arrested for suspected bribe taking by the Supreme People's Procuratorate. In October, he was indicted on charges of bribery and abuse of power.

On 25 March 2024, he stood trial at the Intermediate People's Court of Liuzhou on charges of taking bribes and abuse of power. The public prosecutors accused Yi of abusing his multiple positions between 2003 and 2023 in 2023 to seek favor on behalf of certain organizations and individuals to offer help to others in terms of project contracting, business operation and personnel promotion, and accepted money and property worth more than 81.4 million yuan ($11.5 million) in return. He was sentenced to life. He was also deprived of political rights for life, and all of his personal property will be confiscated.

Government offices
Preceded by Li Yilong	Mayor of Huaihua; 2008–2011	Succeeded by Li Hui
Preceded by Zhang Shuofu	Mayor of Loudi; 2011–2015	Succeeded by Li Jianguo
Party political offices
Preceded by Xiang Lili	Communist Party Secretary of Chenzhou; 2015–2021	Succeeded by Liu Zhiren
