= Lei Shaoye =

Chinese politician

- 雷绍业

Head of the Hunan Provincial Industry and Information Technology Department
- In office April 2022 – April 2024
- Preceded by: Mao Tengfei
- Succeeded by: Wang Wei'an

Communist Party Secretary of Huaihua
- In office March 2021 – April 2022
- Preceded by: Peng Guofu
- Succeeded by: Xu Zhongjian

Mayor of Huaihua
- In office January 2018 – March 2021
- Preceded by: Zhao Yingyun
- Succeeded by: Li Chunqiu

Personal details
- Born: October 1968 (age 57–58) Guiyang County, Hunan, China
- Party: Chinese Communist Party (1990–2025; expelled)
- Education: Hunan Normal University

Chinese name
- Simplified Chinese: 雷绍业
- Traditional Chinese: 雷紹業
Transcriptions
Standard Mandarin
- Hanyu Pinyin: Léi Shàoyè

Lei Shaoye (Chinese: 雷绍业; born October 1968) is a former Chinese university administrator and politician who spent his entire career in his home province Hunan. As of April 2024, he was under investigation by China's top anti-graft watchdog. Previously he served as head of the Hunan Provincial Industry and Information Technology Department.

== Early life and education ==
Lei was born in Guiyang County, Hunan, in October 1968. He obtained a Bachelor of Science degree in 1992, a Master of Philosophy degree in 2001, and a Doctor of Philosophy degree in 2005, all from Hunan Normal University.

== Career ==
After graduating from Hunan Normal University in 1992, Lei stayed at the university and worked successively as an official and deputy director of the Personnel Division, deputy director and director of the Student Affairs Office, director of the Quality Education Office, deputy director of the President's Office, vice dean of the School of Journalism and Communication, deputy party secretary of the School of Foreign Languages, and director of Enrollment and Employment Guidance Service Center.

Lei joined the Chinese Communist Party (CCP) in May 1990 and got involved in politics in July 2005, when he was appointed deputy director of the Hunan Provincial Administration of Work Safety.

Lei was chosen as vice mayor of Loudi in November 2008 and was admitted to member of the CCP Loudi Municipal Committee, the city's top authority. He became head of the Organization Department of the CCP Loudi Municipal Committee and head of the United Front Work Department of the CCP Loudi Municipal Committee in September 2011 before being assigned to the similar position in Changde in August 2014.

Lei was deputy party secretary of Zhuzhou in September 2016, in addition to serving as president of the Zhuzhou Municipal Party School of the Chinese Communist Party.

In December 2017, Lei was named acting mayor of Huaihua, confirmed in January 2018. He also served as deputy party secretary. He rose to become party secretary, the top political position in the city, in March 2021.

In April 2022, Lei was transferred back to Changsha and appointed head of the Hunan Provincial Industry and Information Technology Department.

== Downfall ==
On 13 April 2024, Lei was suspected of "serious violations of laws and regulations" by the Central Commission for Discipline Inspection (CCDI), the party's internal disciplinary body, and the National Supervisory Commission, the highest anti-corruption agency of China. His three predecessors: Zhao Yingyun, Peng Guofu, and Mao Tengfei, have all been disgraced by China's top anticorruption watchdog.

On 7 January 2025, Lei was expelled from the CCP and removed from public office.

Government offices
Preceded by Zhao Yingyun	Mayor of Huaihua; 2018–2021	Succeeded by Li Chunqiu
Preceded by Mao Tengfei	Head of the Hunan Provincial Industry and Information Technology Department; 2022–2024	Succeeded by Wang Wei'an (王卫安)
Party political offices
Preceded by Peng Guofu	Communist Party Secretary of Huaihua; 2021–2022	Succeeded by Xu Zhongjian
