= Wang Yongqing =

Chinese politician

- 汪永清
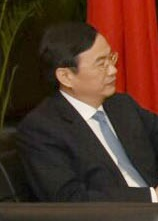
- Wang in 2016

Secretary-General of the Central Political and Legal Affairs Commission
- In office April 2013 – March 2018
- Preceded by: Zhou Benshun
- Succeeded by: Chen Yixin

Personal details
- Born: September 1959 (age 67) Guixi County, Jiangxi, China
- Party: Chinese Communist Party
- Education: Jilin University

Wang Yongqing (Chinese: 汪永清; pinyin: Wāng Yǒngqīng; born September 1959) is a Chinese politician. From 2013 until March 2018, he served as the Secretary-General of the Central Political and Legal Affairs Commission of the Chinese Communist Party (minister-rank), and since 2008, as a Deputy Secretary-General of the State Council. Between 2012 and 2013, he served as the General Office chief of the Central Institutional Organization Commission. Wang spent most of his post-Cultural Revolution career in the State Council's Rule of Law Office.

== Career ==
Wang was born in Guixi County, Jiangxi province. He worked in a local crafts factory as a labourer, then an elementary school teacher; he completed high school after the Cultural Revolution. He joined the Chinese Communist Party in June 1985, then he attended law school at Jilin University. He earned a graduate law degree at Peking University in 1987.

Thereafter he entered the State Council's research office of the Rule of Law Department (国务院法制办公室), and was promoted through its ranks until he was made chief of the office in 1998. He studied at the Central Party School between 1999 and 2001. In 2001 he became the head of the administrative department of the Rule of Law office. He then became the deputy director of the Rule of Law Office, a ministry-level office, in 2003. In 2008 he obtained a doctorate in law at Jilin University. Between September and December 2006 he went to study at the John F. Kennedy School of Government.

In January 2008, he became Deputy Secretary-General of the State Council, in charge mainly of legal and policing affairs; since 2013, he has served as the chief of staff to State Councilor and Public Security Minister Guo Shengkun. In June 2012, Wang was named deputy director of the Working Committee for State Organs, and in November 2012, the chief of the Office of the Central Institutional Organization Commission, entering minister-level ranks for the first time.

In April 2013, Wang succeeded Zhou Benshun as the Secretary-General of the Central Political and Legal Affairs Commission.

Wang is a full member of the 18th Central Committee of the Chinese Communist Party.

Party political offices
Preceded by Wang Dongming	Chief of the General Office of the Central Institutional Organization Commission; 2012 – 2013	Succeeded by Zhang Jinan
Preceded by Zhou Benshun	Secretary-General of the Central Political and Legal Affairs Commission; 2013 – 2018	Succeeded by Chen Yixin
