= Hunan Normal University Press =

Chinese publishing company

- Company type: National first-class press
- Founded: 1989-04-20
- Headquarters: Yuelu District, Changsha, Hunan Province, China
- Products: Books, periodicals, audio-visual, digital products
- Number of employees: 57 (year 2020)
- Website: press.hunnu.edu.cn

Hunan Normal University Press (HNUP; simplified Chinese: 湖南师范大学出版社; traditional Chinese: 湖南師範大學出版社; pinyin: Húnán Shīfàn Dàxué Chūbǎnshè) is a publishing company located in Changsha, Hunan Province, People's Republic of China. It was founded in 1989 and is under the supervision of the Hunan Provincial Department of Education and sponsored by Hunan Normal University. HNUP is a national first-class publishing house, and has the qualifications to publish books, periodicals, as well as all kinds of teaching materials for primary and secondary schools.

== History ==
On April 20, 1989, Hunan Normal University Press was founded on the campus of the University in Yuelu District of Changsha.

In 1996, the Science Enlightenment (科学启蒙) magazine was founded to popularize natural science knowledge to young people. It later won the awards of Third National Journal 100 Key Journals, and China's Top 100 Science and Technology Journals.

On August 11, 2009, HNUP was rated as a national first-class publishing house (one of the top 100 book publishing units in the country) by the State Administration of Press, Publication, Radio, Film and Television.

In 2017, the Journal of Foreign Languages and Cultures (JFLC) was founded. It is indexed in Scopus, MLA International Bibliography, ERIH PLUS, and NSSD.

== Publications ==
Hunan Normal University Press has published more than 3,800 books and two periodicals, including:

=== Books ===
- Textbooks for primary and secondary schools: Ideology and Morality (later changed to Morality and the Rule of Law), Physical Education and Health, Junior Middle School Information Technology, Writing, Primary School Computers, etc.
- University textbooks: English Reading Skills and Practice, Chinese language and literature series textbooks, high-quality tutorials for animation majors in colleges and universities, physical education, etc.
- Supporting teaching materials and teaching guidance books for primary, secondary and universities.
- Works on Hunan culture: Hunan Literature Collection, Hunan Dialects Research and other series.
- Books awarded at the national or provincial and ministerial levels: Dongting Lake Vertebrate Monitoring and Bird Resources, Black Hole Physics, Appreciating the Charm of Traditional Academics, 60 Years of China's Elementary Education, the National Anthem, etc.
- Others: Diplomatic Materials of the Qing Dynasty, Illustrated Guide to Large Fungi in Hunan, Modern Notes and Translations of the Records of the Three Kingdoms, Wisdom Stories of Three Thousand Years of People, Special Topic Research on Olympic Mathematics, etc.

=== Periodicals ===
- Journal of Foreign Languages and Cultures,
- The Science Enlightenment Magazine (《科学启蒙》杂志, in Chinese)

== See also ==
- Hunan Normal University
- Hunan University Press
