= Yang Weiguo =

Chinese politician

- 阳卫国

Mayor of Zhuzhou
- In office April 2016 – August 2021
- Party Secretary: Mao Tengfei
- Preceded by: Mao Tengfei
- Succeeded by: Chen Huiqing

Personal details
- Born: July 1967 (age 59) Hengdong County, Hunan, China
- Party: Chinese Communist Party (1993–2022; expelled)
- Education: Wuhan University; Hunan University

Chinese name
- Simplified Chinese: 阳卫国
- Traditional Chinese: 陽衛國
Transcriptions
Standard Mandarin
- Hanyu Pinyin: Yáng Wèiguó

Yang Weiguo (Chinese: 阳卫国; born July 1967) is a former Chinese politician who spent his entire career in his home-province Hunan. He was investigated by China's top anti-graft agency in January 2022. Previously he served as director of Taiwan Affairs Office of the CCP Hunan Provincial Committee and before that, mayor of Zhuzhou. He was a delegate to the 13th National People's Congress.

== Biography ==
Yang was born in Hengdong County, Hunan, in July 1967. In 1986, he was accepted to Wuhan University, majoring in Chinese language and literature. He also earned his master's degree in history from Hunan University in 2006. He joined the Chinese Communist Party (CCP) in December 1993.

After graduating in 1990, he was despatched to the Comprehensive Research Office of the General Office of the CCP Hunan Provincial Committee, serving in the post until he was transferred to the Organization Department of CCP Hunan Provincial Committee in July 2002. He was promoted to be party secretary of Chaling County in February 2003, concurrently serving as head of Publicity Department of CCP Zhuzhou Municipal Committee since August 2006. He was also admitted to member of the standing committee of the CCP Zhuzhou Municipal Committee, the city's top authority. In August 2010, he became deputy party secretary of Zhuzhou, concurrently holding the mayor position since April 2016. In July 2021, he was appointed director of Taiwan Affairs Office of the CCP Hunan Provincial Committee.

=== Downfall ===
On 7 January 2021, he has been placed under investigation for "serious violations of discipline and laws" by the Central Commission for Discipline Inspection (CCDI), the party's internal disciplinary body, and the National Supervisory Commission, the highest anti-corruption agency of China. His deputy Gu Feng (顾峰), vice mayor of Zhuzhou, was sacked for graft in April 2021.

On 23 June 2022, he was expelled from the CCP and removed from public office.

Government offices
Preceded by Mao Tengfei	Mayor of Zhuzhou; 2016–2021	Succeeded by Chen Huiqing
Party political offices
Preceded by Xiao Xiangqing	Director of Taiwan Affairs Office of the CCP Hunan Provincial Committee; 2021	Succeeded by Zeng Zhifu
