= Gong Wusheng =

Chinese politician

- 龚武生

Communist Party Secretary of Loudi
- In office December 2011 – March 2016
- Preceded by: Lin Wu
- Succeeded by: Li Jianguo

Mayor of Yongzhou
- In office December 2005 – December 2011
- Preceded by: Liu Aicai
- Succeeded by: Wei Xuanjun

Communist Party Secretary of Dao County
- In office August 1992 – March 1997
- Preceded by: Li Bendao
- Succeeded by: Jiang Zhengping

Personal details
- Born: August 1956 (age 69) Xintian County, Hunan, China
- Party: Chinese Communist Party (1981–2020; expelled)

Chinese name
- Simplified Chinese: 龚武生
- Traditional Chinese: 龔武生
Transcriptions
Standard Mandarin
- Hanyu Pinyin: Gōng Wǔshēng

Gong Wusheng (Chinese: 龚武生; born August 1956) is a former Chinese politician who served as party secretary of Loudi from 2011 to 2016, and mayor of Yongzhou from 2005 to 2011. As of May 2020, he was under investigation by China's top anti-corruption agency. Gong crossed paths with and was known to be a close ally of Qin Guangrong. He was a delegate to the 11th National People's Congress.

== Biography ==
Gong was born in Xintian County, Hunan, in August 1956. During the late Cultural Revolution, in April 1975, he became a sent-down youth in his home-county. After graduating from Lingling Normal School (now Hunan University of Science and Engineering) in 1980, he stayed at the school and worked in its Communist Youth League.

He joined the Chinese Communist Party (CCP) in March 1981. In 1983, he was appointed deputy secretary of Lingling (now Yongzhou) Prefectural Party Committee of the Communist Youth League, working as a deputy to Qin Guangrong. In December 1987, he was despatched to Shuangpai County and made secretary of Commission for Discipline Inspection, the party's agency in charge of anti-corruption efforts. He was admitted to member of the standing committee of the CCP Shuangpai County Committee, the county's top authority. He was assigned to the similar position in Dao County in December 1989. In August 1992, Qin Guangrong, the then CCP Committee Secretary of Lingling, promoted him to become party secretary of Dao County, the top political position in the county. In March 1997, he became secretary-general of CCP Yongzhou Municipal Committee. In December 2005, he was named acting mayor of Yongzhou, succeeding Liu Aicai. He was installed as mayor in February 2006, his first foray into a regional leadership role. In December 2011, he was reassigned to Loudi and rose to become party secretary. It would be his first job as "first-in-charge" of a prefecture-level city. In March 2016, he took office of deputy secretary-general of Hunan Provincial Committee of the CCP and vice chairperson of the Hunan People's Congress Agriculture and Rural Affairs Committee, and served until his retirement in January 2018.

=== Downfall ===
On 9 May 2020, he was put under investigation for alleged "serious violations of discipline and laws" by the Central Commission for Discipline Inspection (CCDI), the party's internal disciplinary body, and the National Supervisory Commission, the highest anti-corruption agency of China. One month later, his successor Li Jianguo was also placed under investigation for "serious violations of discipline and laws". Four consecutive party secretaries of Dao County, Gong Wusheng, Gao Jianhua (高建华), Yi Guangming (易光明) and Tang Xianglin (唐湘林), were sacked for graft one after another. On November 2, he was expelled from the CCP. On November 18, he was detained by the Henan Provincial People's Procuratorate. On December 18, he was indicted on suspicion of accepting bribes.

Party political offices
Preceded by Li Bendao	Communist Party Secretary of Dao County; 1992–1997	Succeeded by Jiang Zhengping
Preceded by Lin Wu	Communist Party Secretary of Loudi; 2011–2016	Succeeded by Li Jianguo
Government offices
Preceded by Liu Aicai	Mayor of Yongzhou; 2005–2011	Succeeded by Wei Xuanjun
