= Politics of Shaoyang =

The Politics of Shaoyang in Hunan province in the People's Republic of China is structured in a dual party-government system like all other governing institutions in mainland China.

The mayor of Shaoyang is the highest-ranking official in the People's Government of Shaoyang or Shaoyang Municipal Government. However, in the city's dual party-government governing system, the mayor has less power than the Chinese Communist Party Committee Secretary of Shaoyang, colloquially termed the "CCP Party Chief of Shaoyang" or "Communist Party Secretary of Shaoyang".

== History ==
On December 18, 2013, Tong Mingqian was placed under investigation by the Chinese Communist Party's Central Commission for Discipline Inspection (CCDI) for "serious violations of laws and regulations".

On July 24, 2015, the CCDI placed Zhou Benshun under investigation.

== List of mayors of Shaoyang ==
No.	English name	Chinese name	Took office	Left office	Notes
1	Lang Yizhu	郎艺珠	March 1986	June 1988	
2	Chen Maozhi	陈茂志	June 1988	May 1989	
3	Peng Maowu	彭茂吾	May 1989	December 1994	
4	Kong Lingzhi	孔令志	December 1994	May 2000	
5	Luo Yuelin	罗月林	May 2000	October 2002	
6	Huang Tianci	黄天锡	October 2002	April 2007	
7	Guo Wenguang	郭光文	April 2007	January 2008	Acting
8	Guo Wenguang	郭光文	January 2008	February 2012	
9	Gong Wenmi	龚文密	February 2012	January 2013	
10	Gong Wenmi	龚文密	January 2013	April 2016	
11	Liu Shiqing	刘事青	April 2016		

== List of CCP Party secretaries of Shaoyang ==
No.	English name	Chinese name	Took office	Left office	Notes
1	Liu Yangchun	刘阳春	March 1986	February 1991	
2	Wu Xiangdong	吴向东	February 1991	September 1992	
3	Sun Zaifu	孙载夫	September 1992	August 1995	
4	Zhou Benshun	周本顺	August 1995	November 2000	
5	Jiang Jianguo	蒋建国	November 2000	May 2004	
6	Sheng Maolin	盛茂林	May 2004	April 2007	
7	Huang Tianci	黄天锡	April 2007	March 2008	
8	Tong Mingqian	童名谦	March 2008	February 2012	
9	Guo Guangwen	郭光文	February 2012		
10	Gong Congmi	龚从密	April 2016		
