= Long Xiaohua =

Chinese politician (born 1963)

- 龙晓华

Governor of Xiangxi Tujia and Miao Autonomous Prefecture
- In office December 2016 – December 2022
- Party Secretary: Ye Hongzhuan; Guo Zhenggui
- Preceded by: Guo Jianqun
- Succeeded by: Chen Hua

Personal details
- Born: December 1963 (age 62) Huayuan County, Hunan, China
- Party: Chinese Communist Party
- Education: Xiangxi Tujia and Miao Autonomous Prefecture Agricultural School; Jishou University; Hunan University of Technology and Business; Hunan University; Central Party School of the Chinese Communist Party

Chinese name
- Simplified Chinese: 龙晓华
- Traditional Chinese: 龍曉華
Transcriptions
Standard Mandarin
- Hanyu Pinyin: Lóng Xiǎohuá

Long Xiaohua (Chinese: 龙晓华; born December 1963) is a former Chinese politician of Miao ethnicity who spent her entire career in her home province Hunan. As of February 2023 she was under investigation by China's top anti-corruption agency. Previously she served as governor of Xiangxi Tujia and Miao Autonomous Prefecture.

She was a delegate to the 13th National People's Congress.

== Early life and education ==
Long was born in Huayuan County, Hunan, in December 1963. After taking the college entrance examination in 1978, Long entered Xiangxi Tujia and Miao Autonomous Prefecture Agricultural School, where she majored in tea and fruits. Long also graduated from Jishou University, Hunan University of Technology and Business, Hunan University, and the Central Party School of the Chinese Communist Party.

== Career ==
After graduating in 1981, Long was assigned as a technician and assistant agronomist at Jishou Municipal Agricultural Bureau, and became an office cadre of Jishou Municipal Agricultural Committee in August 1984. She joined the Chinese Communist Party (CCP) in June 1985.

In July 1989, Long was reassigned as director of the Office of the People's Government of Xiangxi Tujia and Miao Autonomous Prefecture, and became a secretary for its Secretary Section in June of the following year.

Long was a secretary for the General Office of Hunan Provincial Committee of the Chinese People's Political Consultative Conference in April 1993 and subsequently the Office of Hunan Provincial Ethnic Affairs Commission four months later. In September 1994, she became deputy director of the Office, rising to director in October 2000.

Long served as deputy director of Hunan Provincial Office Affairs Administration in January 2002, and eight years later she was promoted to the director position.

In December 2016, Long was named acting governor and deputy party secretary of Xiangxi Tujia and Miao Autonomous Prefecture, confirmed in January 2017.

In January 2023, Long was chosen as chairperson of the Economic and Technological Committee of Hunan Provincial Committee of the Chinese People's Political Consultative Conference.

== Downfall ==
On 19 February 2023, Long has been placed under investigation for "serious violations of laws and regulations" by the Central Commission for Discipline Inspection (CCDI), the party's internal disciplinary body, and the National Supervisory Commission, the highest anti-corruption agency of China. On 24 July 2023, the Standing Committee of the 13th Hunan Provincial Committee of the Chinese People's Political Consultative Conference (CPPCC) revoked her membership. In September 2023, the Hunan Provincial People's Procuratorate made a decision to arrest Long on suspicion of bribery. In December 2023, she was formally expelled from the Chinese Communist Party.

Government offices
Preceded by ?	Director of Hunan Provincial Office Affairs Administration; 2010–2016	Succeeded by Song Dongchun (宋冬春)
Preceded by Guo Jianqun	Governor of Xiangxi Tujia and Miao Autonomous Prefecture; 2016–2022	Succeeded by Chen Hua (陈华)
