= Yin Yuying (politician) =

Chinese politician

- 印宇鹰

Chairman of the Huaihua Municipal Committee of the Chinese People's Political Consultative Conference
- In office January 2022 – April 2024
- Preceded by: Pu Xuelian
- Succeeded by: TBA

Personal details
- Born: November 1970 (age 55) Yuanling County, Hunan, China
- Party: Chinese Communist Party
- Education: Central Party School of the Chinese Communist Party

Chinese name
- Simplified Chinese: 印宇鹰
- Traditional Chinese: 印宇鷹
Transcriptions
Standard Mandarin
- Hanyu Pinyin: Yìn Yǔyīng

Yin Yuying (Chinese: 印宇鹰; born November 1970) is a former Chinese politician who spent his entire career in his home province Hunan. He was investigated by China's top anti-graft agency in April 2024. Previously he served as chairman of the Huaihua Municipal Committee of the Chinese People's Political Consultative Conference.

== Biography ==
Yin was born in Yuanling County, Hunan, in November 1970, and graduated from the Central Party School of the Chinese Communist Party.

He worked in the Organization Department of the CCP Huaihua Municipal Committee for a long time. He was deputy party secretary of Hecheng District in June 2008, in addition to serving as president of the District Party School. In June 2011, he was named acting governor of the district, confirmed in September of the same year. He was appointed party secretary of Tongdao Dong Autonomous County in August 2013 and three years later was admitted as a member of the CCP Huaihua Municipal Committee, the prefecture-level city's top authority. In April 2021, he became secretary of the Political and Legal Affairs Commission of the CCP Huaihua Municipal Committee, a position he held until January 2022, when he was chosen as chairman of the Huaihua Municipal Committee of the Chinese People's Political Consultative Conference.

=== Downfall ===
On 14 April 2024, he was put under investigation for alleged "serious violations of discipline and laws" by the Central Commission for Discipline Inspection (CCDI), the party's internal disciplinary body, and the National Supervisory Commission, the highest anti-corruption agency of China. His deputy Xie Shangcheng (谢商成) was disgraced by China's top anticorruption watchdog on the same day. His colleague Lei Shaoye, party secretary of Huaihua, was sacked for graft on the previous day.

Assembly seats
Preceded by Pu Xuelian (蒲学联)	Chairman of the Huaihua Municipal Committee of the Chinese People's Political Consultative Conference; 2022–2024	Succeeded by TBA
