= Li Jianguo (politician, born 1963) =

Chinese politician

- 李荐国

President of Hunan Academy of Social Sciences
- In office December 2019 – September 2020
- Preceded by: Liu Jianwu
- Succeeded by: Cao Puhua

Chairman of the Standing Committee of Loudi Municipal People's Congress
- In office January 2017 – December 2019
- Preceded by: Yi Chunyang
- Succeeded by: Liu Fei

Communist Party Secretary of Loudi
- In office March 2016 – December 2019
- Preceded by: Gong Wusheng
- Succeeded by: Liu Fei

Mayor of Loudi
- In office May 2015 – March 2016
- Preceded by: Yi Pengfei
- Succeeded by: Yang Yiwen

Personal details
- Born: March 1963 (age 63) Hengdong County, Hunan, China
- Party: Chinese Communist Party (1983–2021; expelled)
- Education: Hengyang Normal University

Chinese name
- Simplified Chinese: 李荐国
- Traditional Chinese: 李荐國
Transcriptions
Standard Mandarin
- Hanyu Pinyin: Lǐ Jiànguó

Li Jianguo (Chinese: 李荐国; born March 1963) is a former Chinese politician who served as mayor and party secretary of Loudi, and chairman of the Standing Committee of Loudi Municipal People's Congress. He was investigated by China's top anti-graft agency in June 2020 and was sentenced to 13 years for bribery in October 2021.

== Biography ==
Li was born in Hengdong County, Hunan, in March 1963. He joined the Chinese Communist Party in January 1983. In 1983, he enrolled in Hengyang Normal College (now Hengyang Normal University), majoring in Chinese language and literature. After college in 1984, he worked in the Communist Youth League of the college. From August 1985 to June 1996, he worked in the Hengyang Municipal Committee of the Communist Youth League. He was eventually promoted to the top position of secretary in November 1995. In June 1996, he was transferred to Chengbei District as its governor and deputy party secretary. He became magistrate of Hengnan County, a county under the jurisdiction of Hengyang, in February 2002, and then party secretary, the top political position in the city, beginning in August of that same year.

He became a member of the Standing Committee of the CPC Chenzhou Committee in September 2006 before being assigned to the similar position in Shaoyang in September 2011.

In March 2013, he became deputy secretary-general of Hunan Provincial People's Government, concurrently serving as director of the Beijing Office of Hunan Provincial People's Government.

In March 2015, he was named acting mayor of Loudi, and was installed in May 2015. After this office was terminated in March 2016, he moved up the ranks to become party secretary, and chairman of the Standing Committee of its Municipal People's Congress, serving until December 2019.

In December 2019, he was transferred to Changsha, a major city and capital of Hunan province, as president of Hunan Academy of Social Sciences. He was a representative of the 19th National Congress of the Chinese Communist Party.

=== Downfall ===
On 10 June 2020, he has been placed under investigation for "serious violations of laws and regulations" by the Central Commission for Discipline Inspection (CCDI), the party's internal disciplinary body, and the National Supervisory Commission, the highest anti-corruption agency of China. On September 9, he was dismissed from public office. He was detained by the Hunan Provincial People's Procuratorate on December 22.

In January 2021, he was indicted on suspicion of accepting bribes. On April 2, he stood trial at the Intermediate People's Court of Yiyang on charges of taking bribes. He was accused of illegally accepting money and gifts amounting to over 27 million yuan ($4.22 million) either by himself or through some of his close relatives while holding various government positions between 2008 and 2020 in both Shaoyang and Loudi, abusing his positions of power to help others in medical sales, project contracting, project payment, and job promotion. On May 31, he was expelled from the Chinese Communist Party. On October 22, he received a sentence of 13 years in prison and fine of three million yuan for corruption. The money and property that Li had received in the form of bribes, as well as any interest arising from them, will be turned over to the national treasury.

Government offices
Preceded by Yi Pengfei	Mayor of Loudi; 2015–2016	Succeeded by Yang Yiwen
Party political offices
Preceded by Gong Wusheng	Communist Party Secretary of Loudi; 2016–2019	Succeeded by Liu Fei
Assembly seats
Preceded by Yi Chunyang	Chairman of the Standing Committee of Loudi Municipal People's Congress; 2017–2019	Succeeded by Liu Fei
