= Politics of Xiangxi Tujia and Miao Autonomous Prefecture =

The Politics of Xiangxi Tujia and Miao Autonomous Prefecture in Hunan province in the People's Republic of China is structured in a dual party-government system like all other governing institutions in mainland China.

The Mayor of Xiangxi Tujia and Miao Autonomous Prefecture is the highest-ranking official in the People's Government of Xiangxi Tujia and Miao Autonomous Prefecture or Xiangxi Tujia and Miao Autonomous Prefecture Municipal Government. However, in the prefecture's dual party-government governing system, the Mayor has less power than the Communist Party of Xiangxi Tujia and Miao Autonomous Prefecture Municipal Committee Secretary, colloquially termed the "CPC Party Chief of Xiangxi Tujia and Miao Autonomous Prefecture" or "Communist Party Secretary of Xiangxi Tujia and Miao Autonomous Prefecture".

== History ==
During the 1950s, debate arose within government institutions of Hunan about what sort of designation to bestow upon present-day Xiangxi, resulting from a wider debate about Tujia identity. In the early portion of the decade, a number of ethnic Tujia in the region and beyond protested initial classifications which labelled them as part of the Miao people. This classification resulted in Xiangxi being designated as a Miao Autonomous Prefecture during this period. Provincial officials remained quite hesitant about officially recognizing the Tujia people as their own ethnic group, with one protesting during a meeting that "If the Tujia are an ethnic minority, all of China is [made up of] ethnic minorities, and I am an ethnic minority too". In February 1954, a team from the national government concluded that the Tujia were a distinct ethnic minority, which Hunan provincials again rejected. Hunan officials, opposed to create a Tujia Autonomous Prefecture due in part to the affirmative action policies which the region would receive, even claimed that the Tujia language was simply a local dialect. Finally, on January 3, 1957, the central government recognized the Tujia people as a distinct ethnicity.

This decision shifted the debate over whether the Tujia of Hunan should be awarded their own Autonomous Prefecture, or whether it would be shared with the local Miao people. Many Tujia in the region supported a distinctly Tujia Autonomous Prefecture, while officials in the Hunan provincial government largely favored a joint Tujia and Miao Autonomous Prefecture. During this time, the national Anti-Rightist Campaign began to intensify, resulting in a number of people in the area being listed as "rightists". Shortly before a provincial meeting regarding the status of the Autonomous Prefecture, a prominent activist for a solely Tujia Autonomous Prefecture was condemned for being a rightist, influencing the meeting participants to recommend a joint Tujia and Miao Autonomous Prefecture.

Following this recommendation, the Xiangxi Tujia and Miao Autonomous Prefecture was established in the summer in 1957. However, the Anti-Rightist Campaign began to intensify shortly after the Autonomous Prefecture's founding, and began to include ethnic issues among its "rightist" offenses. Throughout Hunan, over 300 people were labelled as "ethnic problems" (Chinese: 民族问题; pinyin: mínzú wèntí), and 41 Tujia people were labelled as "ethnic rightists" (Chinese: 民族右派分子; pinyin: mínzú yòupài fènzi). However, the Hunan provincial government's past unwillingness to classify and identify Tujia people prevented any wider targeting within the region. These problems regarding the Tujia people appear to be isolated to Hunan, with few instances of anti-Tujia targeting being reported among the Tujia population in neighboring Enshi Tujia and Miao Autonomous Prefecture, in Hubei province.

Following the death of Mao Zedong, and the end of the Cultural Revolution, the Eleventh Congress of the Chinese Communist Party reintroduced policies meant to empower and aid ethnic minorities. However, many in Hunan remained fearful of ethnic persecution, and the provincial government failed to restart these policies for multiple years. During the mid-1980s, government authorities within the Xiangxi Tujia and Miao Autonomous Prefecture began to survey the Autonomous Prefecture's population in order to identify ethnic minorities, often using self-reports to classify people.

One report from 1996 found that the one-child policy, which ethnic minorities were supposed to be exempt from, was loosely enforced among the Tujia people of the Autonomous Prefecture.

On August 14, 2009, Li Dalun was sentenced to life imprisonment for accepting bribes, holding a huge amount of property from an unidentified source and abusing his power by the Higher People's Court in Hunan.

On December 18, 2013, Tong Mingqian was placed under investigation by the Central Commission for Discipline Inspection of the Chinese Communist Party for "serious violations of laws and regulations".

== List of governors of Xiangxi Tujia and Miao Autonomous Prefecture ==
No.	English name	Chinese name	Took office	Left office	Notes
1	Ning Sheng	宁生	April 1977	1978	
2	Wu Yunchang	吴运昌	1978	1981	Director of Revolutionary Committee
3	Wu Yunchang	吴运昌	1981	1988	
4	Shi Yuzhen	石玉珍	January 1988	December 1992	
5	Xiang Shilin	向世林	December 1992	October 1997	
6	Wu Jihai	武吉海	October 1997	January 1998	Acting
7	Wu Jihai	武吉海	January 1998	March 2003	
8	Du Chongyan	杜崇烟	April 2003	February 2004	Acting
9	Du Chongyan	杜崇烟	February 2004	December 2007	
10	Xu Keqin	徐克勤	January 2008	December 2008	
11	Ye Hongzhuan	叶红专	December 2008	February 2013	
12	Guo Jianqun	郭建群	February 2013	May 2013	Acting
13	Guo Jianqun	郭建群	May 2013	13 October 2016	She died
14	Long Xiaohua	龙晓华	October 2016	January 2017	Acting
15	Long Xiaohua	龙晓华	January 2017	December 2022	
16	Chen Hua	陈华	December 2022	June 2026	
17	Shang Shenglong	尚生龙	June 2026		

== List of CPC Party secretaries of Xiangxi Tujia and Miao Autonomous Prefecture ==
No.	English name	Chinese name	Took office	Left office	Notes
1	Ning Sheng	宁生	April 1977	May 1983	
2	Yang Zhengwu	杨正午	June 1983	February 1990	
3	Zheng Peimin	郑培民	May 1990	1994	
4	Shi Changlu	石昌禄	1994	April 1995	
5	Li Dalun	李大伦	April 1995	1998	
6	Peng Duixi	彭对喜	January 1997	February 2003	
7	Tong Mingqian	童名谦	February 2003	March 2008	
8	He Zezhong	何泽中	March 2008	January 2013	
9	Ye Hongzhuan	叶红专	January 2013	March 2021	
10	Guo Zhenggui	虢正贵	March 2021	October 2024	
11	Liu Tao	刘涛	October 2024		
