= Wang Zhijun =

Chinese politician

- 王志军

Party Secretary of Hunan
- Incumbent
- Assumed office 24 October 2026
- Deputy: Xie Weijiang; Jin Wei
- Preceded by: Shen Xiaoming

Executive Deputy Secretary-General of the State Council
- In office 4 July 2023 – 3 November 2026
- Secretary-General: Wu Zhenglong
- Preceded by: Ding Xuedong

Specifically-designated Deputy Communist Party Secretary of Heilongjiang
- In office April 2022 – July 2023
- Party Secretary: Xu Qin
- Preceded by: Chen Haibo
- Succeeded by: Vacant

Personal details
- Born: September 1965 (age 61) Hohhot, Inner Mongolia, China
- Party: Chinese Communist Party (CCP)

Chinese name
- Simplified Chinese: 王志军
- Traditional Chinese: 王志軍
Transcriptions
Standard Mandarin
- Hanyu Pinyin: Wáng Zhìjūn

Wang Zhijun (Chinese: 王志军; born September 1965) is a Chinese politician, currently serving as the Party Secretary of Hunan since October 2026. Previously, he was served as the Executive Deputy Secretary-General of the State Council (minister-level).

He is a representative of the 20th National Congress of the Chinese Communist Party and a member of the 20th Central Committee of the Chinese Communist Party.

== Biography ==
Wang was born in Hohhot, Inner Mongolia, in September 1965.

Wang served in the National Development and Reform Commission, the State Energy Office and the Central Finance and Economic Affairs Commission.

Wang was promoted to vice minister of Industry and Information Technology in January 2019.

In April 2022, Wang was transferred to northeast China's Heilongjiang province and appointed deputy party secretary, and was admitted to member of the Standing Committee of the CCP Heilongjiang Provincial Committee, the province's top authority.

In October 2026, Wang was served as the Party Secretary of Hunan.

Party political offices
Preceded by Chen Haibo	Specifically-designated Deputy Communist Party Secretary of Heilongjiang; 2022–2023	Succeeded by Zhang Anshun
Preceded by Shen Xiaoming	Party Secretary of Hunan; 2026–	Incumbent
Government offices
Preceded by Ding Xuedong	Executive Deputy Secretary-General of the State Council; 2023–2026	Vacant
