= Politics of Loudi =

The Politics of Loudi in Hunan province in the People's Republic of China is structured in a dual party-government system like all other governing institutions in mainland China.

The mayor of Loudi is the highest-ranking official in the People's Government of Loudi or Loudi Municipal Government. However, in the city's dual party-government governing system, the Mayor has less power than the municipal Chinese Communist Party Committee Secretary, colloquially termed the "CCP Party Chief of Loudi" or "Communist Party Secretary of Loudi".

== History ==
On May 9, 2020, former party chief Gong Wusheng (龚武生) was placed under investigation for "serious violations of laws and regulations" by the Central Commission for Discipline Inspection (CCDI), the Chinese Communist Party's internal disciplinary body, and the National Supervisory Commission, the highest anti-corruption agency of China. On November 2, he was expelled from the Chinese Communist Party.

== List of mayors of Loudi ==
No.	English name	Chinese name	Took office	Left office	Notes
1	Zhang Jiangong	张建功	January 1991	July 1999	
2	Liu Yunzhu	刘云柱	April 2000	June 2005	
3	Lin Wu	林武	June 2005	November 2006	Acting
4	Lin Wu	林武	November 2006	March 2008	
5	Zhang Shuofu	张硕辅	April 2008	January 2009	Acting
6	Zhang Shuofu	张硕辅	January 2009	June 2011	
7	Yi Pengfei	易鹏飞	June 2011	January 2012	Acting
8	Yi Pengfei	易鹏飞	January 2012	March 2015	
9	Li Jianguo	李荐国	April 2015	May 2015	Acting
10	Li Jianguo	李荐国	May 2015	March 2016	
11	Yang Yiwen	杨懿文	April 2016	May 2016	Acting
12	Yang Yiwen	杨懿文	May 2016	April 2021	
12	Zeng Chaoqun	曾超群	April 2021		

== List of CCP Party secretaries of Loudi ==
No.	English name	Chinese name	Took office	Left office	Notes
1	Yu Yingsheng	余英生	1999	April 2000	
2	Zhang Jiangong	张建功	April 2000	February 2003	
3	Cai Lifeng	蔡力峰	February 2003	January 2008	
4	Lin Wu	林武	March 2008	December 2012	
5	Gong Wusheng	龚武生	December 2012	March 2016	
6	Li Jianguo	李荐国	March 2016	January 2017	
7	Li Jianguo	李荐国	January 2017	December 2019	
8	liu Fei	刘非	December 2019	October 2021	
9	Zou Wenhui	邹文辉	October 2021		
