= Li Yilong =

Chinese politician

- 李亿龙

Communist Party Secretary of Hengyang
- In office March 2013 – March 2016
- Preceded by: Zhang Wenxiong
- Succeeded by: Zhou Nong

Communist Party Secretary of Huaihua
- In office March 2008 – March 2013
- Preceded by: Liu Lianyu
- Succeeded by: Zhang Ziyin

Mayor of Huaihua
- In office January 2007 – June 2008
- Preceded by: Chen Zhiqiang
- Succeeded by: Yi Pengfei

Communist Party Secretary of Liuyang
- In office September 2002 – April 2006
- Preceded by: Yuan Guanqing
- Succeeded by: Yi Jialiang

Personal details
- Born: June 1956 (age 70) Wangcheng County, Hunan, China
- Party: Chinese Communist Party (1986–2016; expelled)
- Education: Zhongnan University of Economics and Law

Chinese name
- Traditional Chinese: 李億龍
- Simplified Chinese: 李亿龙
Transcriptions
Standard Mandarin
- Hanyu Pinyin: Lǐ Yìlóng

Li Yilong (Chinese: 李亿龙; born June 1956) is a former Chinese politician who spent his entire career in central China's Hunan province. He was investigated by the Chinese Communist Party's Central Commission for Discipline Inspection in April 2016. Previously he served as the deputy director of Hunan Provincial Rural Work Leading Group.

Li Yilong is nicknamed "Mayor of Constructing Cities" (造城市长) for vigorously develop urban construction during his term in office.

== Career ==
Born in Wangcheng County of Changsha, Hunan in June 1956, Li Yilong graduated from Zhongnan University of Economics and Law in 1988. He was a sent-down youth during the Down to the Countryside Movement.

He served in various posts in Changsha People's Government before serving as Chinese Communist Party Committee Secretary of Liuyang, a county-level city under the jurisdiction of Changsha, in 2002. He was mayor of Huaihua from January 2007 to June 2008, and Communist Party Secretary, the top political position in the city, from March 2008 to March 2013. Then he was transferred to Hengyang and appointed the Communist Party Secretary there. In March 2016, he was named deputy director of Hunan Provincial Rural Work Leading Group, but having held the position for only one month, while he was placed under investigation by the Central Commission for Discipline Inspection.

== Downfall ==
On September 23, 2016, he was detained by the Hunan Provincial People's Procuratorate. On November 23, he was expelled from the Chinese Communist Party and dismissed from public office.

On August 11, 2017, he was indicted on suspicion of accepting bribes, corruption, abusing his powers, and holding a huge amount of property with unidentified sources.

On January 15, 2018, he was sentenced to 18 years for accepting bribes, holding a huge amount of property from an unidentified source and abusing his power by the Loudi Intermediate People's Court. His wife Yang Lan was sentenced to 3 years for accepting bribes.

== Personal life ==
Li married Yang Lan (杨岚; born 12 April 1968), who served as a section member in Changsha Municipal Government before detaining by the Central Commission for Discipline Inspection (CCDI).

Government offices
Preceded by Hu Jin'an	Magistrate of Furong District; 1998–2000	Succeeded by Shi Changsong
Preceded by Chen Zhiqiang (陈志强)	Mayor of Huaihua; 2007–2008	Succeeded by Yi Pengfei (易鹏飞)
Party political offices
Preceded by Dong Xuesheng	Communist Party Secretary of Furong District; 2000–2002	Succeeded by Zhang Yinglong
Preceded by Yuan Guanqing (袁观清)	Communist Party Secretary of Liuyang; 2002–2006	Succeeded by Yi Jialiang (易佳良)
Preceded by Liu Lianyu (刘莲玉)	Communist Party Secretary of Huaihua; 2008–2013	Succeeded by Zhang Ziyin (张自银)
Preceded by Zhang Wenxiong (张文雄)	Communist Party Secretary of Hengyang; 2013–2016	Succeeded by Zhou Nong (周农)
