= Politics of Yongzhou =

The Politics of Yongzhou in Hunan province in the People's Republic of China is structured in a dual party-government system like all other governing institutions in mainland China.

The Mayor of Yongzhou is the highest-ranking official in the People's Government of Yongzhou or Yongzhou Municipal Government. However, in the city's dual party-government governing system, the Mayor has less power than the Communist Party of Yongzhou Municipal Committee Secretary, colloquially termed the "CPC Party Chief of Yongzhou" or "Communist Party Secretary of Yongzhou".

== List of mayors of Yongzhou ==
No.	English name	Chinese name	Took office	Left office	Notes
1	Bian Cuiping	卞翠屏	1996	1997	
2	Wang Daosheng	王道生	1997	September 1999	
3	Liu Aicai	刘爱才	September 1999	December 2005	
4	Gong Wusheng	龚武生	December 2005	February 2006	Acting
5	Gong Wusheng	龚武生	February 2006	December 2011	
6	Wei Xuanjun	魏旋君	December 2011	January 2012	Acting
7	Yan Zhihui	严志辉	April 2013	May 2013	Acting
8	Yan Zhihui	严志辉	May 2013	June 2014	
9	Xiang Shuguang	向曙光	May 2014	June 2014	
10	Xiang Shuguang	向曙光	June 2014	June 2015	
11	Yi Jialiang	易佳良	August 2015	December 2017	
12	Zhao Yingyun	赵应云	December 2017	January 2018	
13	Zhao Yingyun	赵应云	January 2018	January 2020	
14	Zhu Hongwu	朱洪武	8 January 2020	August 2021	
15	Chen Ailin	陈爱林	August 2021		

== List of CPC Party secretaries of Yongzhou ==
No.	English name	Chinese name	Took office	Left office	Notes
1	Zhou Jinzhuo	邹金鷟	June 1993	December 2000	
2	Zeng Qingyan	曾庆炎	December 2000	March 2008	
3	Huang Tianci	黄天锡	March 2008	June 2011	
4	Zhang Shuofu	张硕辅	June 2011	March 2013	
5	Chen Wenhao	陈文浩	April 2013	December 2016	
6	Li Hui	李晖	December 2016	January 2017	
7	Li Hui	李晖	January 2017	February 2019	
8	Yan Hua	严华	February 2019	August 2021	
9	Zhu Hongwu	朱洪武	August 2021		
