= Zhang Qingwei =

Chinese politician, business executive and aerospace engineer

- 张庆伟
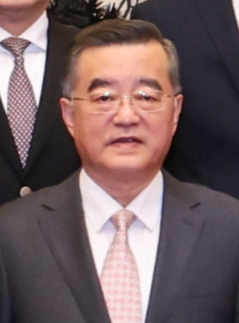
- Zhang in 2025

Vice Chairman of the Standing Committee of the National People's Congress
- Incumbent
- Assumed office 10 March 2023
- Chairman: Zhao Leji

Party Secretary of Hunan
- In office 18 October 2021 – 14 March 2023
- Deputy: Mao Weiming (governor)
- Preceded by: Xu Dazhe
- Succeeded by: Shen Xiaoming

Chairman of Hunan Provincial People's Congress
- In office 19 January 2022 – 28 March 2023
- Preceded by: Xu Dazhe

Party Secretary of Heilongjiang
- In office 1 April 2017 – 18 October 2021
- Deputy: Lu Hao→Wang Wentao (governor)
- Preceded by: Wang Xiankui
- Succeeded by: Xu Qin

Governor of Hebei
- In office 10 January 2012 – 1 April 2017
- Party Secretary: Zhou Benshun; Zhao Kezhi
- Preceded by: Chen Quanguo
- Succeeded by: Xu Qin

Chairperson of Commission for Science, Technology and Industry for National Defense
- In office 30 August 2007 – 15 March 2008
- Premier: Wen Jiabao
- Preceded by: Zhang Yunchuan
- Succeeded by: Chen Qiufa

Personal details
- Born: 7 November 1961 (age 64) Jilin City, Jilin, China
- Party: Chinese Communist Party
- Education: Northwestern Polytechnical University

Chinese name
- Simplified Chinese: 张庆伟
- Traditional Chinese: 張慶偉
Transcriptions
Standard Mandarin
- Hanyu Pinyin: Zhāng Qìngwěi

Zhang Qingwei (Chinese: 张庆伟; born 7 November 1961) is a Chinese politician, business executive, and aerospace engineer, who is a vice chairperson of the Standing Committee of the National People's Congress. He was formerly the Party Secretary of Hunan, the Party Secretary of Heilongjiang, Governor of Hebei, and chairperson of the Commission for Science, Technology and Industry for National Defense (COSTIND). Prior to his government career he was president of China Aerospace Science and Technology Corporation (CASC) and chairman of Comac, an aerospace manufacturer.

Zhang was well known for his work for military contractors, and headed the team that designed and constructed the Xian JH-7 "flying leopard" combat aircraft. He was also the deputy leader of the project to send a Chinese man into space, and the leader of the Chinese Lunar Exploration Program, Chang'e 1. In 2009, Zhang was named one of China's 40 most powerful people by BusinessWeek.

== Early life and education ==
Zhang was born in Jilin City, Jilin Province on 7 November 1961, but is considered a native of his ancestral home of Laoting County, Hebei province by Chinese convention. His family later moved to Tangshan, Hebei.

Zhang studied at the aircraft department of Northwestern Polytechnical University (NPU) in Xi'an from September 1978 to August 1982, majoring in aircraft design. After graduation, he was assigned to No. 603 Research Institute of the Ministry of Aerospace Industry, designing aircraft tails. Within three years he became the leader of a team that developed the FBC-1 fighter-bomber that is still in use by the People's Liberation Army Air Force.

In 1985, Zhang returned to NPU to continue his studies, and received a Master of Engineering degree in aircraft control in 1988.

== Aerospace industry ==
In 1988 Zhang returned to work for the Ministry of Aerospace Industry and later joined China Academy of Launch Vehicle Technology (CALT), the birthplace of China's Long March rocket. He showed exceptional talent at CALT and was credited with the 1990 launch of the AsiaSat 1 satellite for the American company Hughes Satellite Systems. It marked the first time for the Long March rocket to successfully launch a foreign satellite.

After the success with AsiaSat 1, Zhang was tasked with developing the Long March 2 rocket for China's human spaceflight program (later called the Shenzhou program). He became the deputy director of CALT in 1996, and the vice-manager of the newly established China Aerospace Science and Technology Corporation (CASC) in 1999. In 2001 he was appointed president of CASC, and starting in February 2002 he concurrently served as deputy chief commander of the Shenzhou program. In October 2003 Shenzhou 5 completed China's first ever human spaceflight mission, and two years later two more astronauts safely returned to earth after a five-day spaceflight on Shenzhou 6.

In August 2007 Zhang was appointed chairperson of the Commission for Science, Technology and Industry for National Defense (COSTIND), becoming one of the youngest persons to hold a minister-level post in China. He guided the merger of COSTIND with the Ministry of Industry and Information Technology in 2008. He also concurrently served as head of the Chinese Lunar Exploration Program.

In 2008 Zhang was appointed chairman of the Commercial Aircraft Corporation of China (Comac), a state-owned enterprise that was newly established to develop China's own jumbo jets. In 2009, he drew international attention after being named one of China's 40 most powerful people by BusinessWeek.

== Political career ==
Zhang joined the Chinese Communist Party (CCP) in December 1992. In 2002, less than ten years after he joined the party, he was appointed to the 16th Central Committee of the CCP, the party's top authority. At age 41 he was the youngest full member of the committee. He has subsequently been elected to full memberships of the 17th and 18th Central Committees.

In August 2011 Zhang left Comac and was appointed acting governor of Hebei Province, replacing Chen Quanguo, who had been promoted to Party Secretary of Tibet Autonomous Region. In January 2012 he was officially elected by the Hebei Provincial Congress as governor, and reelected in January 2013. Zhang was one of the earliest examples of rocket scientists taking on major political posts in China, a trend that intensified following Xi Jinping's ascension to the General Secretary of the Chinese Communist Party in 2012, with many "space alumni" joining government ranks thereafter. Zhang was transferred to Heilongjiang to serve as party secretary in April 2017, becoming the fourth official born after 1960 to assume a provincial party secretary post.

On 18 October 2021, he was transferred to central China's Hunan province and appointed Party Secretary, the top political position in the province. On March 10, 2023, during the 14th National People's Congress, he was appointed Vice Chairman of the Standing Committee of the National People's Congress.

== Awards ==
- Top ten young scientists in the space industry (1991)
- Top ten outstanding young people in China (1999)
- CCTV business figure of the year (2003)

Business positions
Preceded by Wang Liheng	General Manager of China Aerospace Science and Industry Corporation; 2001–2007	Succeeded by Ma Xingrui
New title	Chairman of the Commercial Aircraft Corporation of China, Ltd. 2008–2011	Succeeded by Jin Zhuanglong
Government offices
Preceded by Zhang Yunchuan	Chairperson of Commission for Science, Technology and Industry for National Defense; 2007–2008	Succeeded by Chen Qiufa
Preceded by Chen Quanguo	Governor of Hebei; 2011–2017	Succeeded by Xu Qin
Party political offices
Preceded by Wang Xiankui	Party Secretary of Heilongjiang; 2017–2021	Succeeded by Xu Qin
Preceded by Xu Dazhe	Party Secretary of Hunan; 2021–present	Incumbent
Assembly seats
Preceded by Wang Xiankui	Chairman of Heilongjiang People's Congress; 2017–2022	Succeeded by Xu Qin
Preceded by Xu Dazhe	Chairman of Hunan People's Congress; 2022–present	Incumbent
