= Party Secretary of Hunan =

Provincial government position in China

Secretary of the Hunan Provincial Committee of the Chinese Communist Party
- 中国共产党湖南省委员会书记
- Emblem of the Chinese Communist Party

- Flag of the Chinese Communist Party
- Incumbent; Wang Zhijun since 24 October 2026
- Hunan Provincial Committee of the Chinese Communist Party
- Type: Party Committee Secretary
- Status: Provincial and ministerial-level official
- Member of: Hunan Provincial Standing Committee
- Nominator: Central Committee
- Appointer: Hunan Provincial Committee Central Committee
- Inaugural holder: Huang Kecheng
- Formation: August 1949
- Deputy: Deputy Secretary; Secretary-General

The secretary of the Hunan Provincial Committee of the Chinese Communist Party is the leader of the Hunan Provincial Committee of the Chinese Communist Party (CCP). As the CCP is the sole ruling party of the People's Republic of China (PRC), the secretary is the highest ranking post in Hunan.

The secretary is officially appointed by the CCP Central Committee based on the recommendation of the CCP Organization Department, which is then approved by the Politburo and its Standing Committee. The secretary can be also appointed by a plenary meeting of the Hunan Provincial Committee, but the candidate must be the same as the one approved by the central government. The secretary leads the Standing Committee of the Hunan Provincial Committee, and is usually a member of the CCP Central Committee. The secretary leads the work of the Provincial Committee and its Standing Committee. The secretary is outranks the governor, who is generally the deputy secretary of the committee.

The current secretary is Wang Zhijun, who took office on 24 October 2026.

== List of party secretaries ==
Image	Name (English)	Name (Chinese)	Term start	Term end	Ref.
	Huang Kecheng	黄克诚	August 1949	October 1952	
	Jin Ming	金明	October 1952	October 1953	
	Zhou Xiaozhou	周小舟	October 1953	March 1960	
	Zhang Pinghua	张平化	March 1960	October 1970	
	Hua Guofeng	华国锋	October 1970	September 1977	
	Mao Zhiyong	毛致用	September 1977	May 1988	
	Xiong Qingquan	熊清泉	May 1988	September 1993	
	Wang Maolin	王茂林	September 1993	October 1998	
	Yang Zhengwu	杨正午	October 1998	December 2005	
	Zhang Chunxian	张春贤	December 2005	April 2010	
	Zhou Qiang	周强	April 2010	March 2013	
	Xu Shousheng	徐守盛	March 2013	August 2016	
	Du Jiahao	杜家豪	August 2016	November 2020	
	Xu Dazhe	许达哲	November 2020	October 2021	
	Zhang Qingwei	张庆伟	October 2021	March 2023	
	Shen Xiaoming	沈晓明	March 2023	October 2026	
	Wang Zhijun	王志军	October 2026	Incumbent	
