= Politics of Chenzhou =

The Politics of Chenzhou in Hunan province in the People's Republic of China is structured in a dual party-government system like all other governing institutions in mainland China.

The Mayor of Chenzhou is the highest-ranking official in the People's Government of Chenzhou or Chenzhou Municipal Government. However, in the city's dual party-government governing system, the Mayor has less power than the Communist Party of Chenzhou Municipal Committee Secretary, colloquially termed the "CPC Party Chief of Chenzhou" or "Communist Party Secretary of Chenzhou".

== History ==
On August 14, 2009, Li Dalun was sentenced to life imprisonment for accepting bribes, holding a huge amount of property from an unidentified source and abusing his power by the Higher People's Court in Hunan.

== List of mayors of Chenzhou ==
No.	English name	Chinese name	Took office	Left office	Notes
1	Long Dingding	龙定鼎	May 1995	March 2000	
2	Zhou Zhengkun	周政坤	March 2000	December 2003	On November 11, 2008, he was sentenced to life in prison.
3	Dai Daojin	戴道晋	March 2004	November 2008	Executive vice chairman of the 12th CPPCC since 2018.
4	Xiang Lili	向力力	November 2008	February 2009	Acting
5	Xiang Lili	向力力	February 2009	December 2011	Vice chairman of the 13th People's Congress since 2018.
6	Qu hai	瞿海	December 2011	December 2011	Acting
7	Qu hai	瞿海	December 2011	December 2016	
8	Liu Zhiren	刘志仁	December 2016	January 2017	Acting
9	Liu Zhiren	刘志仁	January 2017		

== List of CPC Party secretaries of Chenzhou ==
No.	English name	Chinese name	Took office	Left office	Notes
1	Mei Kebao	梅克保	April 1995	February 1999	
2	Li Dalun	李大伦	February 1999	May 2006	
3	Ge Hongyuan	葛洪元	June 2006	November 2008	
4	Dai Daojin	戴道晋	November 2008	December 2011	
5	Xiang Lili	向力力	December 2011	March 2015	
6	Yi Pengfei	易鹏飞	March 2015	January 2017	
7	Yi Pengfei	易鹏飞	January 2017	March 2021	
8	Liu Zhiren	刘志仁	March 2021	March 2022	
9	Wu Jupei	吴巨培	March 2022		
