= Politics of Changde =

The Politics of Changde in Hunan province in the People's Republic of China is structured in a dual party-government system like all other governing institutions in mainland China.

The Mayor of Changde is the highest-ranking official in the People's Government of Changde or Changde Municipal Government. However, in the city's dual party-government governing system, the Mayor has less power than the Changde Municipal Committee Secretary of the Chinese Communist Party (CCP), colloquially termed the "CCP Party Chief of Changde" or "Communist Party Secretary of Changde".

== History ==
On December 15, 2011, Cheng Haibo was sentenced to life imprisonment, deprived of political rights for life, and confiscated personal property, for accepting bribes.

== List of mayors of Changde ==
No.	English name	Chinese name	Took office	Left office	Notes
1	Yang Huiquan	杨汇泉	October 1980	January 1983	
2	Wang Xiaofeng	汪啸风	January 1983	April 1986	
3	Cheng Linyi	程林义	May 1986	July 1989	
4	Cai Changsong	蔡长松	July 1989	December 1992	
5	Wu Dingxian	吴定宪	January 1993	January 1995	
6	Zhang Changping	张昌平	March 1995	January 1998	
7	Cheng Haibo	程海波	February 1998	February 1999	Acting
8	Cheng Haibo	程海波	February 1999	March 2001	
9	Chen Junwen	陈君文	April 2001	January 2002	Acting
10	Chen Junwen	陈君文	January 2002	March 2007	
11	Qing Jianwei	卿渐伟	May 2007	January 2008	
12	Qing Jianwei	卿渐伟	January 2008	December 2008	
13	Chen Wenhao	陈文浩	December 2008	April 2013	
14	Zhou Derui	周德睿	April 2013	May 2013	Acting
15	Zhou Derui	周德睿	May 2013	September 2017	
16	Cao Lijun	曹立军	September 2017	December 2017	
17	Cao Lijun	曹立军	December 2017	July 2020	
18	Zou Wenhui	邹文辉	July 2021	November 2021	
19	Zhou Zhenyu	周振宇	November 2021		

== List of CPC Party secretaries of Changde ==
No.	English name	Chinese name	Took office	Left office	Notes
1	Guo Liangui	郭连贵	September 1977	October 1980	
2	Liu Jiashi	刘佳时	December 1980	July 1983	
3	Chen Zhangjia	陈彰嘉	June 1983	September 1990	
4	Pang Daomu	庞道沐	September 1990	January 1995	
5	Wu Dingxian	吴定宪	January 1995	April 2001	
6	Cheng Haibo	程海波	March 2001	March 2006	In 2009, he was sentenced to Death with a two-year reprieve for taking bribes.
7	Wu Jihai	武吉海	April 2006	December 2008	
8	Qing Jianwei	卿渐伟	December 2008	March 2013	
9	Wang Qun	王群	March 2013	June 2017	
10	Zhou Derui	周德睿	June 2017	March 2021	
11	Yang Yiwen	杨懿文	April 2021	November 2021	
12	Cao Zhiqiang	曹志强	November 2021		
