= Wang Qun (actor) =

Chinese actor

- Born: January 26, 1960; Beijing, China
- Died: January 3, 2008 (aged 47); Beijing, China
- Education: Beijing Film Academy
- Children: 2
- Awards: Golden Eagle Awards – Best Supporting Actor; 1987 Zhen San

Chinese name
Transcriptions
Standard Mandarin
- Hanyu Pinyin: Wáng Qún
Yue: Cantonese
- Jyutping: Wong^{4} Kwan^{4}

Wang Qun (王群, Pinyin: Wáng Qún; 26 January 1960 – 3 January 2008) was a Chinese actor, film director, action choreographer and martial artist. He is best known for starring in a number of martial arts films in the 1980s and 1990s.

Wang won the 1987 Golden Eagle Award for Best Supporting Actor for the 1986 TV series Zhen San. He died in 2008 from a heart attack.

== Filmography ==
=== Film ===
Year	English title	Original title	Role	Notes
1982	Cut-Throat Struggle for an Invaluable Treasure	塞外奪寶	Zhang	
1986	Revengence Superlady	俠女十三妹	Huo Biao	Also action choreographer
1987	The Magic Beggar	神丐	Yang Luchan	Also action choreographer
1987	Golden Dart Hero	金鏢黃天霸	Huang Tianba	Also action choreographer
1988	The Magic Legs	無敵鴛鴦腿	Wu Jiatai	Also action choreographer
1989	The King Gunner of His Times	一代槍王	Cheng Ziqing	Also action choreographer
1990	Five Heroes Go to Heaven Bridge	五虎闖天橋	Li Guangren	Also action choreographer
1993	Fist from Shaolin	黃飛鴻之男兒當報國	Wong Fei-hung	
1994	Laugh at Life	笑傲人生	Wang Xiaotian	Also co-director, co-writer, and action choreographer

=== TV series ===
Year	English title	Original title	Role	Notes
1986	Zhen San	甄三	Jin Er	Also action choreographer
1988	Escort Agency of Fengtian	奉天鏢局	Liu Zhenyuan	
1995	Operation Iron Eagle	铁鹰行动	Chen Lingyun	
1996	The Imperial Beggar	御花子	Ji Haizi	
1996	Hu Xueyan	胡雪巖	Ronglu	
1997	The Tai Chi Master	太極宗師	Chen Zhengzhou	
1998	Lifetime Love in the Storm	風雨一世情	Yan Ke	
1999	The New Shaolin Temple	新少林寺	Mingsong	
2000	Taiji Prodigy	少年張三豐	Zhang Tao	
2002	Metamorphosis of Heavenly Silkworm	金蠶絲雨	Yan Chongtian	
2004	Thirteen Sons of Heaven Bridge	天橋十三郎	Pang Tai	
2004	Hero	風雲爭霸	Ximen Ruoshui	
2008	Emperor Yang of Sui	隋煬帝	Zhuang Biao	
