= Du Jiahao =

Chinese politician

- 杜家毫

Party Secretary of Hunan
- In office 28 August 2016 – 20 November 2020
- Deputy: Xu Dazhe (Governor)
- Preceded by: Xu Shousheng
- Succeeded by: Xu Dazhe

Governor of Hunan
- In office April 2013 – September 2016
- Preceded by: Xu Shousheng
- Succeeded by: Xu Dazhe

Personal details
- Born: 31 July 1955 (age 71) Shanghai
- Party: Chinese Communist Party
- Education: East China Normal University; Central Party School of the Chinese Communist Party; China Europe International Business School

Du Jiahao (Chinese: 杜家毫; born 31 July 1955) is a Chinese politician, serving since 2016 as the Party Secretary of Hunan. He served between 2013 and 2016 as the Governor of Hunan. Before that, he served as Vice Governor of Heilongjiang province, and also held many positions in Shanghai, including party chief of the Pudong New Area.

== Career ==
Du Jiahao was born in Shanghai, but is considered a native of his ancestral home of Yin County, Zhejiang by Chinese convention. He entered the work force in March 1973, working at the farm tool factory of Yuejin Farm in rural Shanghai. He joined the Chinese Communist Party (CCP) in December that year.

Du worked in the farm administration system of Shanghai for most of the next two decades. In 1983 he enrolled at the Chinese department of East China Normal University on a part-time basis, earning a bachelor's degree in literature in 1988.

In March 1992 Du Jiahao became the CCP deputy committee secretary of Songjiang County (converted to an urban district in 1998) in suburban Shanghai, rising to CCP committee secretary the next year. From 1995 to 1998 he studied economics at the graduate school of the CCP Central Party School, also on a part-time basis.

From 1999 to 2003 Du was the party chief of the urban Yangpu District of Shanghai, and from 2004 to 2007 he was the party chief of the sub-provincial level Pudong New Area of eastern Shanghai. About the same time he enrolled at the China Europe International Business School, obtaining an MBA in 2007.

In December 2007 Du was transferred out of Shanghai for the first time of his career, to Heilongjiang province in Northeastern China where he was appointed Vice Governor, and later deputy party chief in April 2011.

In March 2013 Du was transferred again, to become the deputy party chief of Hunan province in south-central China. He was appointed Acting Governor of Hunan in April and Governor on 31 May 2013. Sometime in 2013, he was awarded a civil honor by the Austrian state of Burgenland. In August 2016, in anticipation of the 19th National Congress of the Chinese Communist Party, Du was elevated to the post of CCP committee secretary of Hunan. Many observers saw this as potentially preparing him for even further elevation.

Du is an alternate of the 18th Central Committee of the Chinese Communist Party. In the 14th National People's Congress, he became chairperson of the Agriculture and Rural Affairs Committee.

Political offices
Preceded by Xu Shousheng	Governor of Hunan; 2013–2016	Succeeded by Xu Dazhe
Party political offices
Preceded by Xu Shousheng	Party Secretary of Hunan; 2016–2020	Succeeded by Xu Dazhe
Preceded by Jiang Sixian	Party Secretary of Pudong; 2004–2007	Succeeded by Xu Lin
