= Xu Dazhe =

Chinese politician and aerospace engineer

- 许达哲
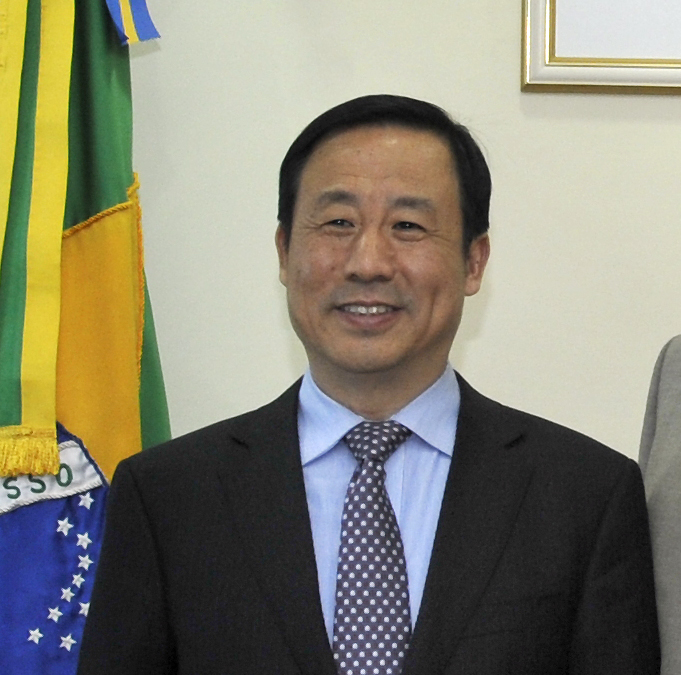
- Xu in 2015

Party Secretary of Hunan
- In office 20 November 2020 – 18 October 2021
- Preceded by: Du Jiahao
- Succeeded by: Zhang Qingwei

Chairman of Hunan People's Congress
- In office January 2021 – January 2022
- Preceded by: Du Jiahao
- Succeeded by: Zhang Qingwei

Governor of Hunan
- In office 5 September 2016 – 27 November 2020
- Preceded by: Du Jiahao
- Succeeded by: Mao Weiming

Director of the China National Space Administration
- In office December 2013 – September 2016
- Premier: Li Keqiang
- Preceded by: Ma Xingrui
- Succeeded by: Tang Dengjie

Personal details
- Born: September 1956 (age 70) Nanchang, Jiangxi, China
- Party: Chinese Communist Party
- Education: Harbin Institute of Technology

Chinese name
- Simplified Chinese: 许达哲
- Traditional Chinese: 許達哲
Transcriptions
Standard Mandarin
- Hanyu Pinyin: Xǔ Dázhé

Xu Dazhe (Chinese: 许达哲; born September 1956) is a Chinese politician and aerospace engineer. He was the Chinese Communist Party Secretary of Hunan. Previously, he was the Governor of Hunan.

== Biography ==
Born in Nanchang, Jiangxi province in 1956, he is a native of Liuyang, Hunan province. Xu obtained a bachelor's and a master's degree in engineering from the Harbin Institute of Technology. He joined the Communist Party in 1982. Xu began his career in the Ministry of Aerospace Industry in 1984 as a technical designer, then was promoted to lead individual projects. Xu also has experience as the head of a rocket construction team. The ministry was eventually spun off as a state-owned enterprise and governed as a corporation. In 2007, Xu was named chief executive and head of the party group of the China Aerospace Science & Industry Corporation, promoted in April 2013 to chairman of the board.

In 2013 he was named vice minister of Industry and Information Technology, chief administrator of the China National Space Administration, and the head of the State Administration for Science, Technology and Industry for National Defence. In September 2016, he was appointed the acting governor of his home province, Hunan. He was the 18th person since 1949 to serve as Governor of Hunan. Xu followed in the footsteps of prominent colleagues such as Ma Xingrui and Chen Qiufa in making the transition from aerospace to politics.

In November 2020, Xu was appointed as the Party Secretary of Hunan.

On 23 October 2021, he was appointed vice chairperson of the National People's Congress Education, Science, Culture and Public Health Committee.

Xu was a member of the 17th Central Commission for Discipline Inspection, and is a member of the 18th Central Committee of the Chinese Communist Party.

On 28 October 2025, Xu's qualification for delegates to the 14th National People's Congress was terminated and the position as vice chairperson of the Education, Science, Culture, and Health Committee of the National People's Congress was revoked.

Business positions
Preceded by Yin Xingliang	General Manager of China Aerospace Science and Industry Corporation; 2007–2013	Succeeded by Gao Hongwei
New title	Chairman of China Aerospace Science and Technology Corporation; 2013	Succeeded by Lei Fanpei
Government offices
Preceded by Ma Xingrui	Director of the China National Space Administration; 2013–2016	Succeeded by Tang Dengjie
Preceded by Du Jiahao	Governor of Hunan; 2016–2020	Succeeded by Mao Weiming
Party political offices
Preceded by Du Jiahao	Party Secretary of Hunan; 2020–2021	Succeeded by Zhang Qingwei
Assembly seats
Preceded by Du Jiahao	Chairman of Hunan People's Congress; 2021–2022	Succeeded by Zhang Qingwei
