= Hunan Normal University =

Provincial public university in Changsha, China

- 湖南师范大学
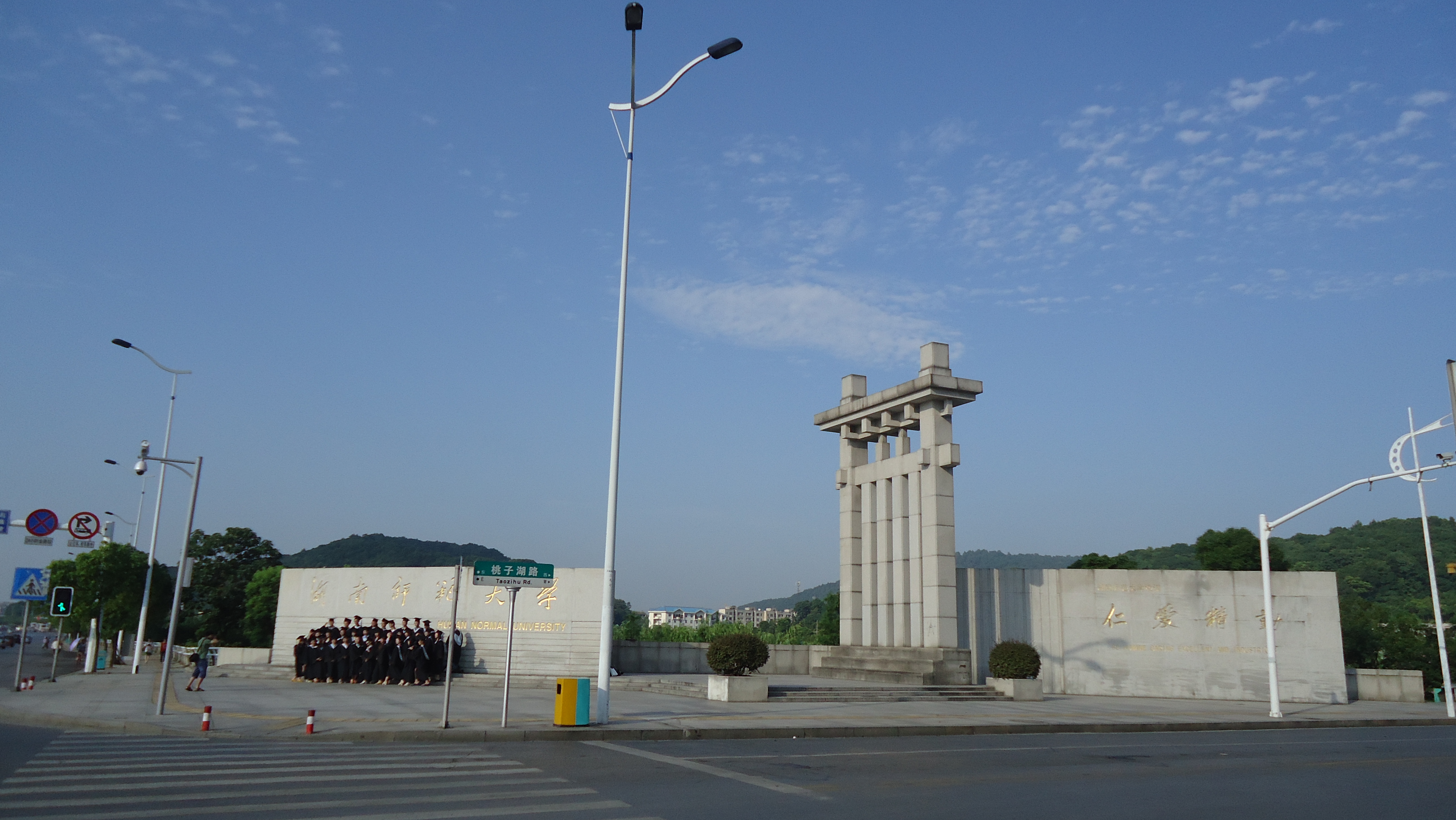
- Main gate of Hunan Normal University
- Motto: Benevolence, Love, Excellence, Diligence
- Type: Public
- Established: 1938; 88 years ago
- President: Liu Qijun (刘起军)
- Academic staff: 1,900 (November 2019)
- Students: 40,000 (November 2019)
- Postgraduates: 10,000 (November 2019)
- Location: Changsha, Hunan, China; 28°11′11″N 112°56′50″E
- Website: hunnu.edu.cn

Chinese name
- Simplified Chinese: 湖南师范大学
- Traditional Chinese: 湖南師範大學
Transcriptions
Standard Mandarin
- Hanyu Pinyin: Húnán Shīfàn Dàxué

Hunan Normal University (HunNU) is a provincial public university in Changsha, Hunan, China. It is affiliated with the Province of Hunan, and co-funded by the Hunan Provincial People's Government and the Ministry of Education. The university is part of Project 211 and the Double First-Class Construction.

== History ==
=== National Normal College ===
Hunan Normal University was built on the first independent teachers' college in China, named "National Normal College," established in 1938. Its historic origin can be traced back to Yuelu Academy in the Northern Song Dynasty, one of the four most prestigious academies over the last 1000 years in China. It was integrated into Hunan University in 1949.

== Structure and departments ==
Consisting of five campuses, the university covers a total area of 1.78 km^{2}, with one million square meters of floor space. Most of the campuses are located near the Yuelu Mountain.

The university is divided into 23 colleges, 3 teaching departments, 51 research institutions. The university offers 74 undergraduate programs, 147 master programs, and 55 Ph.D. programs. There are 10 postdoctoral scientific research stations, 13 State Training and Research Bases or Centers and 7 key laboratories, jointly constructed by the Ministry of Education and Hunan Province, on the campus.

Since its founding, the university has educated nearly 300,000 students, including about 4,000 international students and students from Hong Kong, Macau and Taiwan. Currently, over 24,000 undergraduates, 8,000 graduates and 300 international students are studying on campus.

There are 1091 professors and associate professors at the university; among them are one academician of the Chinese Academy of Sciences and one academician of the Chinese Academy of Engineering. The university has invited about 600 scholars and experts to give lectures or conduct scientific research on campus from more than 20 countries since 2000, and has established relations with over 80 foreign institutions of higher learning for academic exchanges.

== Rankings ==
University rankings

Global – Overall
- ARWU World: 501 (2023)
- CWUR World: 759 (2025)
- CWTS World: 467 (2025)

Regional – Overall
- CWTS Asia: 202 (2025)

National – Overall
- BCUR National: 87 (2023)

Hunan Normal University is consistently ranked among the top 3rd in Hunan province and the top 100th nationwide.

In 2023, Hunan Normal University was ranked # 501 globally by the Academic Ranking of World Universities (ARWU). The university was ranked 759th in the world by the Center for World University Rankings 2025. The university ranked # 623 in the world out of nearly 30,000 universities worldwide by the University Rankings by Academic Performance 2023-2024.

The 2025 CWTS Leiden Ranking ranked Hunan Normal University 467th in the world based on their publications for the period 2020–2023. The Nature Index 2025 Annual Tables by Nature Research ranked the university among the top 300 leading universities globally for the high quality of research publications in natural science.

== Library ==
The library of the university has a collection of 3.4 million volumes, including 200,000 volumes of traditional thread binding books, and subscribes 4,700 kinds of Chinese and foreign periodicals. There are 12 academic periodicals published and distributed by the university. The university has its own publishing house called Hunan Normal University Press.

== See also ==
- High School Attached to Hunan Normal University
