= Politics of Hunan =

The politics of Hunan Province in the People's Republic of China is structured in a dual party-government system like all other governing institutions in mainland China.

The Governor of Hunan is the highest-ranking official in the People's Government of Hunan. However, in the province's dual party-government governing system, the Governor has less power than the Hunan Chinese Communist Party (CCP) Provincial Committee Secretary, colloquially termed the "Hunan CCP Party Chief".

== List of secretaries of CCP Hunan Committee ==
Image	Name (English)	Name (Chinese)	Term start	Term end	Ref.
	Huang Kecheng	黄克诚	August 1949	October 1952	
	Jin Ming	金明	October 1952	October 1953	
	Zhou Xiaozhou	周小舟	October 1953	March 1960	
	Zhang Pinghua	张平化	March 1960	October 1970	
	Hua Guofeng	华国锋	October 1970	September 1977	
	Mao Zhiyong	毛致用	September 1977	May 1988	
	Xiong Qingquan	熊清泉	May 1988	September 1993	
	Wang Maolin	王茂林	September 1993	October 1998	
	Yang Zhengwu	杨正午	October 1998	December 2005	
	Zhang Chunxian	张春贤	December 2005	April 2010	
	Zhou Qiang	周强	April 2010	March 2013	
	Xu Shousheng	徐守盛	March 2013	August 2016	
	Du Jiahao	杜家豪	August 2016	November 2020	
	Xu Dazhe	许达哲	November 2020	October 2021	
	Zhang Qingwei	张庆伟	October 2021	March 2023	
	Shen Xiaoming	沈晓明	March 2023	October 2026	
	Wang Zhijun	王志军	October 2026	Incumbent	

== List of governors of Hunan ==
=== Qing dynasty ===
- Wu Dacheng (1895)

=== Pre-1949 ===
- Zhang Jingyao (1918–1920) - military governor
- Cheng Qian (1928)
- He Jian (1929–1937)
- Cheng Qian (1948)

=== People's Republic of China ===
1. Chen Mingren (陈明仁): 1949–1950
2. Wang Shoudao (王首道): 1950–1952
3. Cheng Qian (程潜): 1952–1967
4. Li Yuan (黎原): 1968–1970
5. Hua Guofeng (华国锋): 1970–1977
6. Mao Zhiyong (毛致用): 1977–1979
7. Sun Guozhi (孙国治): 1979–1983
8. Liu Zheng (刘正): 1983–1985
9. Xiong Qingquan (熊清泉): 1985–1989
10. Chen Bangzhu (陈邦柱):1989–1995
11. Yang Zhengwu (杨正午): 1995–1998
12. Chu Bo (储波): 1998–2001
13. Zhang Yunchuan (张云川): 2001–2003
14. Zhou Bohua (周伯华): 2003.03–2006
15. Zhou Qiang (周强): 2006–2010
16. Xu Shousheng (徐守盛): 2010–2013
17. Du Jiahao (杜家毫): 2013–2016
18. Xu Dazhe (许达哲): 2016–2020
19. Mao Weiming (毛伟明): 2020–2026
20. Xie Weijiang (谢卫江): 2026–

== List of chairmen of Hunan People's Congress ==
1. Wan Da (万达): 1979–1983
2. Sun Guozhi (孙国治): 1983–1985
3. Jiao Linyi (焦林义): 1985–1988
4. Liu Fusheng (刘夫生): 1988–1998
5. Wang Maolin (王茂林): 1998
6. Yang Zhengwu (杨正午): 1999–2006
7. Zhang Chunxian (张春贤): 2006–2010
8. Zhou Qiang (周强): 2010–2013
9. Xu Shousheng (徐守盛): 2013–2016
10. Du Jiahao (杜家毫): 2016–2020
11. Xu Dazhe (许达哲): 2020–2021
12. Zhang Qingwei (张庆伟): 2021–present

== List of chairmen of CPPCC Hunan Committee ==
1. Zhou Xiaozhou (周小舟): 1955–1959
2. Zhang Pinghua (张平化): 1959–1967
3. Mao Zhiyong (毛致用): 1977–1979
4. Zhou Li (周里): 1979–1983
5. Cheng Xingling (程星龄): 1983–1987
6. Liu Zheng (刘正): 1988–1998
7. Liu Fusheng (刘夫生): 1998–2001
8. Wang Keying (王克英): 2001–2003
9. Hu Biao (胡彪): 2003–2013
10. Chen Qiufa: 2013–2016
11. Li Weiwei: 2016–present
