= Standing Committee of the Hunan Provincial People's Congress =

Chairperson of the Hunan Provincial People's Congress
- 湖南省人民代表大会常务委员会主任
- National Emblem of the People's Republic of China

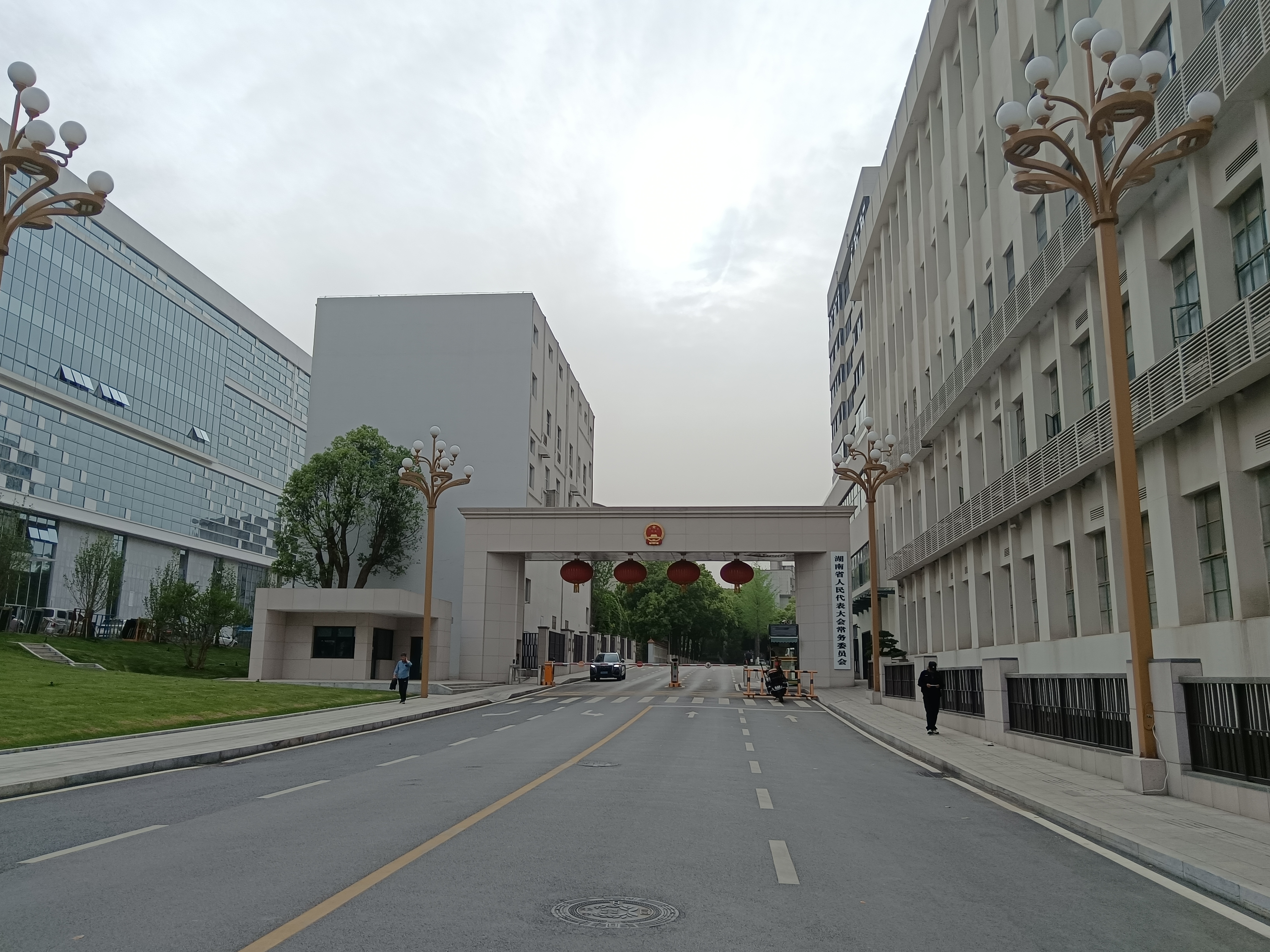
- Incumbent; Shen Xiaoming since January 2024
- Type: Chairperson
- Status: Provincial level official
- Appointer: Hunan Provincial People's Congress

Standing Committee of the Hunan Provincial People's Congress
- Simplified Chinese: 湖南省人民代表大会常务委员会
- Traditional Chinese: 湖南省人民代表大會常務委員會
Transcriptions
Standard Mandarin
- Hanyu Pinyin: Húnán Shěng Rénmín Dàibiǎo Dàhuì Chángwù Wěiyuánhuì

The Standing Committee of the Hunan Provincial People's Congress (Chinese: 湖南省人民代表大会常务委员会) is a permanent organ of the Hunan Provincial People's Congress, responsible to and reporting to the Hunan Provincial People's Congress. Its main functions are legislation, supervision, personnel appointment and removal, decision-making on major issues, theoretical research on people's congresses, etc.

== History ==
On December 29, 1979, the Standing Committee of Hunan Provincial People's Congress was officially established in accordance with the Organic Law of Local People's Congresses and Local People's Governments at All Levels of the People's Republic of China adopted at the 2nd session of the 5th National People's Congress.

== Leaderships of the Standing Committee ==
=== 5th Congress ===
- Term: December 1979 to April 1983
- Chairperson: Wan Da
- Deputy Chairpersons: Tan Yubao (died in January 1980), Guo Sen, Luo Qiuyue (female), Yin Ziming, Qi Shouliang, Wang Hanfu, Tao Zhiyue, Liu Shihong, Ling Xiaxin (died in July 1980), Kong Anmin, Shi Bangzhi (Miao ethnicity), Chen Xinmin (1912), Liu Chunqiao, Wu Zhiyuan (by election in December 1980))
- Secretary-General: Li Qiang

=== 6th Congress ===
- Term: April 1983 to January 1988
- Chairperson: Sun Guozhi (resigned in July 1985), Jiao Linyi (by election in July 1985)
- Deputy Chairpersons: Guo Sen (resigned in July 1985), Tao Zhiyue, Wu Zhiyuan (resigned in July 1985), Ji Zhaoqing, Luo Qiuyue (female), Qi Shouliang, Shi Bangzhi (Miao ethnicity), Kong Anmin, Chen Xinmin, Chen Yuntian, Xie Xinxin, Li Tiangeng, Huang Daoqi (by election in July 1985), Xu Tiangui (by election in July 1985)
- Secretary-General: Zhang Shijun

=== 7th Congress ===
- Term: January 1988 to January 1993
- Chairperson: Liu Fusheng
- Deputy Chairpersons: Huang Daoqi, Li Tiangeng, Luo Qiuyue (female), Chen Xinmin, Chen Yuntian (died in December 1989), Xie Xinxin, Cao Wenju, Liu Yu'e (female), Wu Yunchang (Miao ethnicity), Wang Xiangtian (by election in April 1991, died in 1992), Pan Jiji (by election in April 1991)
- Secretary-General: Zhao Shifang

=== 8th Congress ===
- Term: January 1993 to January 1998
- Chairperson: Liu Fusheng
- Deputy Chairpersons: Dong Zhiwen, Shen Ruiting, Yu Haichao, Liu Yu'e (female), Zhu Dongyang, Wu Yunchang (Miao ethnicity), Zhao Peiyi, Pan Jiji, Luo Haifan (by election in February 1996)
- Secretary-General: Shen Ruiting (February 1995), Guo Junxiu (appointed in February 1995)

=== 9th Congress ===
- Term: January 1998 to January 2003
- Chairpersons: Wang Maolin (resigned in October 1998), Wang Keying (acting from October 1998 to January 1999), Yang Zhengwu (by election in January 1999)
- Deputy Chairpersons: Wang Keying (resigned in January 2001), Luo Haifan, Wu Yunchang (Miao ethnicity), Xie Youqing, Luo Guiqiu, Yan Yongsheng, Gao Jinping (female), Guo Junxiu, Zheng Peimin (by election in January 2001, died in March 2002), Wu Xiangdong (by election in January 2001)
- Secretary-General: Guo Junxiu (January 1999), Liu Yongshou (appointed in January 1999)

=== 10th Congress ===
- Term: January 2003 to January 2008
- Chairperson: Yang Zhengwu (resigned in January 2006), Zhang Chunxian (by election in January 2006)
- Deputy Chairpersons: Wu Xiangdong (resigned in March 2007), Zhou Shichang, Tang Zhixiang, Xie Youqing, Pang Daomu, Yan Yongsheng, Guo Junxiu (died in June 2004), Wang Silian (female), Qi Heping (by election in January 2007), Xie Kangsheng (by election in January 2007)
- Secretary-General: Liu Yongshou

=== 11th Congress ===
- Term: January 2008 to January 2013
- Chairperson: Zhang Chunxian (resigned in September 2010), Zhou Qiang (by election in September 2010)
- Deputy Chairpersons: Qi Heping (resigned in March 2010), Xie Yong, Chen Shuhong, Cai Lifeng, Xiao Yayu, Liu Lianyu (female), Jiang Zuobin (by election in September 2010), Li Jiang (by election in January 2011), Yang Taibo (by election in January 2012)
- Secretary-General: Sun Zaitian

=== 12th Congress ===
- Term: January 2013 to January 2018
- Chairpersons: Zhou Qiang (resigned in May 2013), Xu Shousheng (by election in May 2013, resigned in January 2017), Du Jiahao (by election in January 2017)
- Deputy Chairpersons: Yu Laishan (resigned in March 2016), Xie Yong, Liu Lianyu (female), Xu Minghua (resigned in March 2016), Jiang Zuobin (resigned in March 2016), Chen Junwen, Han Yongwen (by election in February 2015), Li Youzhi (by election in January 2016), Wang Kemin (by election in January 2016), Xu Yousheng (by election in January 2017)
- Secretary-General: Peng Constitutional Law

=== 13th Congress ===
- Term: January 2018 to January 2023
- Chairpersons: Du Jiahao (resigned in January 2021), Xu Dazhe (elected in January 2021, resigned in January 2022), Zhang Qingwei (elected in January 2022)
- Deputy Chairpersons: Liu Lianyu (female), Yang Weigang, Wang Kemin (resigned in January 2021), Xiang Lili (resigned in July 2019), Ye Hongzhuan (resigned in January 2022), Zhou Nong, Huang Guanchun (by election in January 2019, died in March 2022), Peng Guofu (by election in January 2021), Xie Jianhui (by election in January 2022), Zhang Jianfei (by election in January 2022), Chen Wenhao (by election in January 2022)
- Secretary-General: Hu Bojun (resigned in July 2021), Cao Jiongfang (by election in January 2022, resigned in March 2022)

=== 14th Congress ===
- Term: January 2023–present
- Chairperson: Zhang Qingwei (resigned in March 2023 [9]), Shen Xiaoming (January 2024–present)
- Deputy Chairpersons: Ulan, Zhang Jianfei, Chen Fei, Hu Xusheng, Zhou Nong, Peng Guofu (January 2024), Yang Haodong (elected in January 2025) [10]
- Secretary-General: Wang Xiaoke
