= Ulan (politician) =

Chinese politician (born 1962)

- 乌兰

Vice Chairperson of the Standing Committee of the Hunan Provincial People's Congress
- In office 18 January 2023 – October 2025 Serving with Zhang Jianfei, Chen Fei, Hu Xucheng, Zhou Nong, Peng Guofu
- Chairperson: Zhang Qingwei; Shen Xiaoming

Vice Chairperson of the Hunan Provincial Committee of the Chinese People's Political Consultative Conference
- In office 19 January 2022 – 17 January 2021 Serving with Huang Lanxiang, Zhang Dafang, Lai Mingyong, Hu Xucheng, Zhang Jian, Yi Pengfei, Zhang Zhuohua, Hu Weilin, Li Min
- Chairperson: Li Weiwei

Specifically-designated Deputy Communist Party Secretary of Hunan
- In office October 2016 – November 2021 Serving with Xu Dazhe → Mao Weiming
- Party Secretary: Du Jiahao → Xu Dazhe → Zhang Qingwei
- Preceded by: Sun Jinlong
- Succeeded by: Zhu Guoxian

Personal details
- Born: November 1962 (age 63–64) Tongliao, Inner Mongolia, China
- Party: Chinese Communist Party (1984-2026, expelled)
- Education: Baotou Normal College; Central Party School of the Chinese Communist Party

Chinese name
- Simplified Chinese: 乌兰
- Traditional Chinese: 烏蘭
Transcriptions
Standard Mandarin
- Hanyu Pinyin: Wūlán

Ulan (Mongolian: ᠤᠯᠠᠭᠠᠨ; born November 1962), also romanized as Ulagan, or Wulan (Chinese: 乌兰; pinyin: Wūlán), is a Chinese politician of Mongol heritage, serving since 2016 as the Chinese Communist Party Deputy Committee Secretary of Hunan. She spent most of her career in her native Inner Mongolia and rose through the ranks of the Communist Youth League.

== Biography ==
Ulan was born to an ethnic Mongol family in Horqin Left Middle Banner of Jirem League (now Tongliao). She became involved in politics when she was a mere sixteen years old, when she began working for the Communist Youth League (CYL) office in Baotou. In September 1980, she graduated from Baotou Normal School, specializing in political instruction. She continued her involvement in the Youth League after, taking up a series of roles in its organization in Baotou. In June 1987 she was named deputy secretary of the Inner Mongolia CYL organization. In November 1996, the 34 year old Ulan was promoted to secretary.

In February 2000, she left the Youth League system to take up the post of deputy secretary of Ikh Juu League, then deputy party chief of Ordos. In March 2003 she was named governor of Bayannur League. In November 2003 she was named Vice Chairman of Inner Mongolia. In November 2006 she was promoted one step further to the Publicity Department head of the Inner Mongolia party organization and a member of the regional party standing committee.

In November 2016, Ulan broke convention and became CCP Deputy Committee Secretary of Hunan province in south-central China, becoming the first ethnic minority woman to take on a deputy party secretary-ship outside of her home region.

Ulan is an alternate of the 18th Central Committee of the Chinese Communist Party, and a deputy to the 12th National People's Congress.

== Downfall ==
On 9 October 2025, Ulan was put under investigation for alleged "serious violations of discipline and laws" by the Central Commission for Discipline Inspection (CCDI), the party's internal disciplinary body, and the National Supervisory Commission, the highest anti-corruption agency of China. Ulan was expelled from the party and dismissed from the public offices on 13 April 2026.

Civic offices
Preceded by Yang Jing	Secretary of the Inner Mongolia Autonomous Regional Committee of the Communist Youth League of China; 1996–2000	Succeeded by Bai Xiangqun
Government offices
Preceded by Hu Yifeng	Mayor of Bayannur League; 2003	Succeeded by Wang Suyi
Party political offices
Preceded by Mo Jiancheng	Head of the Publicity Department of Inner Mongolia Regional Committee of the Chinese Communist Party; 2006–2016	Succeeded by Bai Yugang
Preceded by Sun Jinlong	Specifically-designated Deputy Communist Party Secretary of Hunan; 2016–2021	Succeeded by Zhu Guoxian
