= Hunan Provincial Committee of the Chinese People's Political Consultative Conference =

Hunan Provincial Committee of the Chinese People's Political Consultative Conference 中国人民政治协商会议湖南省委员会
- 13th
- Emblem of the Chinese People's Political Consultative Conference

Type
- Type: United front organ Constitutional convention (Historical); Legislature (Historical) of Chinese People's Political Consultative Conference

History
- Founded: February 1955; 71 years ago
- Preceded by: Hunan Provincial People's Congress Consultative Committee

Leadership
- Chairperson: Mao Wanchun

Meeting place
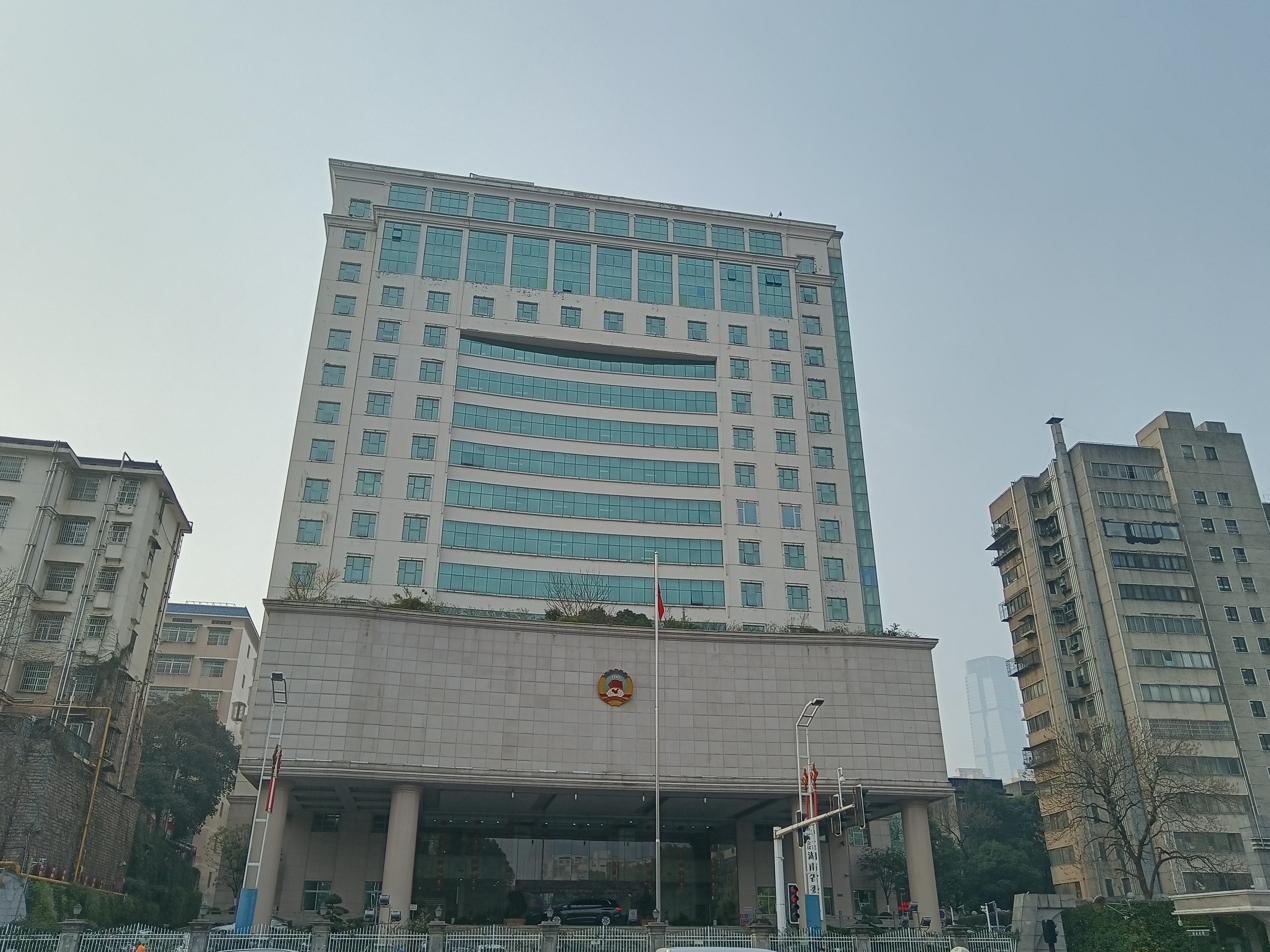

Website
- www.hunanzx.gov.cn/hnzx/index.html

Chinese name
- Simplified Chinese: 中国人民政治协商会议湖南省委员会
- Traditional Chinese: 中國人民政治協商會議湖南省委員會
Transcriptions
Standard Mandarin
- Hanyu Pinyin: Zhōngguó Rénmín Zhèngzhì Xiéshāng Huìyì Húnánshěng Wěiyuánhuì

Abbreviation
- Simplified Chinese: 湖南省政协
- Traditional Chinese: 湖南省政協
- Literal meaning: CPPCC Hunan Provincial Committee
Transcriptions
Standard Mandarin
- Hanyu Pinyin: Húnánshěng Zhèngxié

The Hunan Provincial Committee of the Chinese People's Political Consultative Conference (Chinese: 中国人民政治协商会议湖南省委员会) is the advisory body and a local organization of the Chinese People's Political Consultative Conference in Hunan, China. It is directly supervised by the Hunan Provincial Committee of the Chinese Communist Party.

== History ==
The Hunan Provincial Committee of the Chinese People's Political Consultative Conference traces its origins to the Hunan Provincial People's Congress Consultative Committee (湖南省各界人民代表会议协商委员会), founded in February 1955.

== Term ==
=== 1st ===
- Term: February 1955–December 1959
- Chairperson: Zhou Xiaozhou
- Vice Chairpersons: Zhou Li, Tang Shengzhi, Xie Jin (died in August 1956), Li Muan (died in September 1956), Xie Hua, Cao Bowen, Fang Dingying (May 1957–), Guo Sen, Tang Boqiu
- Secretary-General: Deng Yanru

=== 2nd ===
- Term: December 1959–September 1964
- Chairperson: Zhang Pinghua
- Vice Chairpersons: Zhou Li, Tang Shengzhi, Hua Guofeng, Xie Hua, Cao Bowen, Cao Chi, Fang Dingying, Guo Sen, Tang Boqiu (died in February 1960), Zhou Shizhao, He Binglin, Yuan Fuqing, Ling Xiaxin
- Secretary-General: Zhong Hua (–December 1960) → Xie Jiemei (December 1960–)

=== 3rd ===
- Term: September 1962–November 1977
- Chairperson: Zhang Pinghua (–June 1966)
- Vice Chairpersons: Zhou Li, Tang Shengzhi (died in April 1970), Hua Guofeng, Xie Hua, Cao Bowen (died in December 1971), Guan Jianping, Fang Dingying (died in June 1976), Guo Sen, Zhou Shizhao (died in April 1976), He Binglin (died in October 1966), Yuan Fuqing (died in April 1975), Ling Xiaxin, Wen Shizhen, Wu Shuji (died in November 1968)
- Secretary-General: Meng Xianguo

=== 4th ===
- Term: November 1977–April 1983
- Chairperson: Mao Zhiyong (–April 1979) → Zhou Li (April 1979–)
- Vice Chairpersons: Wan Da (–April 1979), Zhou Li (–April 1979), Shang Zijin, Ling Xiaxin (died in July 1980), Guo Sen (–December 1979), Xie Hua, Huang Yiou (died in 1981), Ding Weike, Gu Ziyuan, Lu Huilin, Zhou Ruhang, Cao Hesun, Yang Kaizhi (died in January 1982), Wang Yanchun (appointed in April 1979), Tao Zhiyue (April 1979–December 1979), He Dequan (April 1979, died in March 1983), Cheng Xingling (April 1979–), Luo Qinan (April 1979–), Weng Xuwen (April 1979, died in August 1981), Wen Shizhen (April 1979, died in November 1981), Yuan Xuezhi (April 1979–), Chen Xinmin (April 1979–December 1979), Chen Yufa (December 1979–), Liu Yaqiu (December 1979–), Huang Ligong (December 1979–), Xiang De (December 1979–), Rang Mingde (December 1980–), Yang Difu (December 1980–), Chen Yuntian (December 1980–), Ling Minyou (December 1980–)
- Secretary-General: Deng Yanru

=== 5th ===
- Term: April 1983–January 1988
- Chairperson: Cheng Xingling (died in October 1987)
- Vice Chairpersons: Yang Difu, Tong Ying, Liu Yaqiu (died in February 1984), Xiang De (died in January 1985), Rang Mingde, Ling Minyou, Lu Huilin, Yuan Xuezhi, Zhou Ruhang, Peng Mingding, Xu Junhu, Chen Xiachan, Cao Guozhi, Jiang Yaxun, Yin Changmin, Zhou Zheng, Chen Hongxin, Liu Guoan
- Secretary-General: Yin Hui (–July 1985) → Wu Limin (July 1985–)

=== 6th ===
- Term: January 1988–January 1993
- Chairperson: Liu Zheng
- Vice Chairpersons: Yin Changmin, Zhou Zheng (–May 1991), Tong Ying (–May 1991), Xu Junhu, Chen Xiachan, Liu Guoan (–May 1991), Yuan Longping, He Shaoxun, Zhang Deren, Han Ming, Zhuo Kangning (added in April 1991), Long Yuxian (added in April 1991), Deng Youzhi (added in April 1991), Yang Zhongshu (added in April 1991)
- Secretary-General: Zhou Zheng (–October 1988) → Li Yanju (acting in October 1988, April 1989–April 1991) → Zhuo Kangning (April 1991–)

=== 7th ===
- Term: January 1993–January 1998
- Chairperson: Liu Zheng
- Vice Chairpersons: Zhuo Kangning (–August 1996), Long Yuxian, Deng Youzhi, Shi Yuzhen, Yuan Longping, He Shaoxun, Han Ming, Yang Zhongshu, Xu Youheng, Yang Huiquan (added in February 1994), Xie Youqing (added in February 1994), Fang Yutang (added in February 1994), Chen Zhangjia (added in February 1996), Fan Duofu (added in February 1996)
- Secretary-General: Zhuo Kangning (–February 1994) → Zhou Jitai (February 1994–January 1995) → Chen Zhangjia (January 1995–)

=== 8th ===
- Term: January 1998–January 2003
- Chairperson: Liu Fusheng (–January 2001) → Wang Keying (January 2001–)
- Vice Chairpersons: Shi Yuzhen, Chen Zhangjia, Li Yiheng (added in January 2001), Yuan Longping, Yang Zhongshu, Fang Yutang, Fan Duofu, You Bizhu, Cai Zixing, Yao Shouzuo, Lin Ziliang, Lu Guangxiu
- Secretary-General: Chen Zhangjia (–January 1999) → Li Gangting (appointed in January 1999)

=== 9th ===
- Term: January 2003–January 2008
- Chairperson: Hu Biao
- Vice Chairpersons: Wen Xuande (January 2004–), Sun Zaifu (January 2007–), Shi Yuzhen (January 2007–), Li Yiheng, Yuan Longping, Yao Shouzuo, Lu Guangxiu, Zhang Ruifu, Yang Baohua, Wang Tingming, Liu Xiao, Long Guojian, Xie Yong
- Secretary-General: Li Gangting

=== 10th ===
- Term: January 2008–January 2013
- Chairperson: Hu Biao
- Vice Chairpersons: Shi Yuzhen (–January 2011), Yuan Longping, Yang Baohua (–January 2011), Liu Xiao, Long Guojian (–January 2011), Wei Wenbin, Tan Zhongchi, He Baoxiang (–January 2012), Gong Jianming, Wu Jihai (January 2011–), Wang Xiaoqin (January 2011–), Yang Weigang (January 2011–), Zhang Dafang (January 2012–)
- Secretary-General: Ouyang Bin

=== 11th ===
- Term: January 2013–January 2018
- Chairperson: Chen Qiufa (–May 2015) → Li Weiwei (January 2016–)
- Vice Chairpersons: Sun Jianguo (January 2015–), Wu Jihai (–January 2016), Yuan Longping (–January 2016), Liu Xiao (–January 2016), Wang Xiaoqin (–January 2016), Yang Weigang, Zhang Dafang, Ouyang Bin, Tong Mingqian (–December 2013), Lai Mingyong, Ge Hongyuan (February 2014–), Yuan Xinhua (January 2016–), Dai Daojin (January 2017–), Hu Xusheng (January 2017–)
- Secretary-General: Ouyang Bin (–February 2014) → Yuan Xinhua (February 2014–January 2017) → Qing Jianwei (January 2017–)

=== 12th ===
- Term: January 2018–January 2023
- Chairperson: Li Weiwei
- Vice Chairpersons: Dai Daojin (–January 2021), Zhang Dafang, Lai Mingyong, Hu Xusheng, Peng Guofu (–January 2021), He Anjie (–January 2022), Zhang Jian, Yi Pengfei, Zhang Zhuohua, Hu Weilin (January 2021–), Li Min (January 2021–), Ulan (January 2022–), Huang Lanxiang (January 2022–)
- Secretary-General: Qing Jianwei

=== 13th ===
- Term: January 2023–2028
- Chairperson: Mao Wanchun
- Vice Chairpersons: Lai Mingyong, Zhang Jian, Zhang Zhuohua, Hu Weilin, Li Min, Xiao Bailing, Guo Zhenggui, Pan Biling, He Jihua, Wang Yiguang (January 2025–), Li Jianzhong (January 2025–)
- Secretary-General: Deng Qunce
