= Yuan Longping =

Chinese agronomist (1930–2021)

- 袁隆平
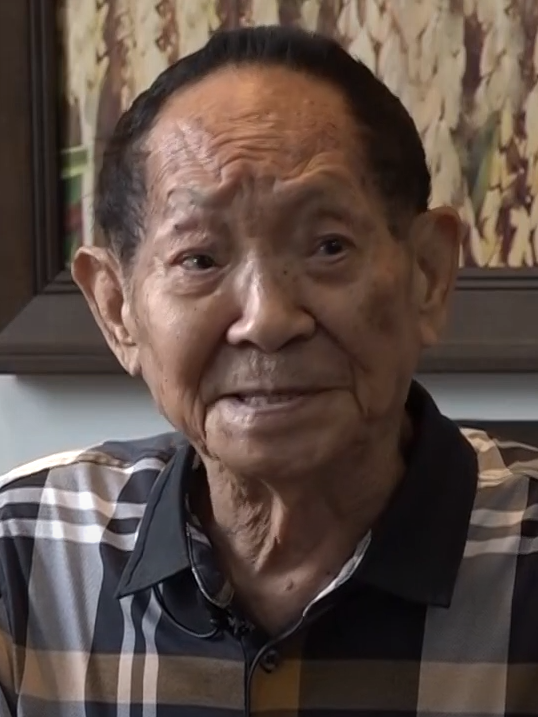
- Yuan Longping in 2019

Vice Chairman of the Hunan Provincial CPPCC Committee (6th, 7th, 8th, 9th, 10th, 11th)
- In office January 1988 – January 2016
- Chairman: Liu Zheng→Liu Fusheng→Wang Keying→Hu Biao→Chen Qiufa

Member of the Standing Committee of the CPPCC (6th, 7th, 8th, 9th, 10th, 11th, 12th)
- In office June 1983 – March 2018
- Chairman: Deng Yingchao → Li Xiannian → Li Ruihuan → Jia Qinglin → Yu Zhengsheng

Personal details
- Born: September 7, 1930 Peking Union Medical College Hospital, Beijing, China
- Died: May 22, 2021 (aged 90) Xiangya Hospital, Changsha, Hunan, China
- Spouse: Deng Ze (m. 1964–2021)
- Children: 2
- Education: High School Affiliated to Nanjing Normal University
- Alma mater: Southwest Agricultural College
- Occupation: Inventor
- Profession: Agronomist
- Known for: Hybrid rice
- Awards: State Preeminent Science and Technology Award (2001); Wolf Prize in Agriculture (2004); World Food Prize (2004); Confucius Peace Prize (2012); Order of the Republic (2019)

Chinese name
- Simplified Chinese: 袁隆平
- Traditional Chinese: 袁隆平
Transcriptions
Standard Mandarin
- Hanyu Pinyin: Yuán Lóngpíng
- Wade–Giles: Yuan Lung-p'ing
- IPA: [ɥɛ̌n lʊ̌ŋ pʰǐŋ]

Yuan Longping (Chinese: 袁隆平; pinyin: Yuán Lóngpíng; September 7, 1930 – May 22, 2021) was a Chinese agronomist and inventor. He was a member of the Chinese Academy of Engineering known for developing the first hybrid rice varieties in the 1970s, part of the Green Revolution in agriculture. For his contributions, Yuan is known as the "Father of Hybrid Rice". Yuan was bestowed the Medal of the Republic, the highest honorary medal of the People's Republic of China, in September 2019.

Hybrid rice has since been grown in dozens of countries in Africa, America, and Asia—boosting food security and providing a robust food source in areas with a high risk of famine. The technology allowed China to sustain 20% of the global population on 9% of global arable land, an achievement in food security for which he was awarded the 2004 World Food Prize and the 2004 Wolf Prize in Agriculture respectively.

== Early life and education ==
Yuan was born at Peking Union Medical College Hospital in Beijing, China on September 7, 1930, to Yuan Xinglie and Hua Jing. He was the second of six siblings. His ancestral home is in De'an County, Jiujiang, Jiangxi Province in Southern China. During the Second Sino-Japanese War and the Chinese Civil War, he moved with his family and attended school in many places, including Hunan, Chongqing, Hankou and Nanjing.

He graduated from Southwest Agricultural College (now part of Southwest University) in 1953.

== Career ==
Yuan began his teaching career at the Anjiang Agricultural School, Hunan Province. In the 1960s he had the idea of hybridizing rice to increase its yield after reading of similar research that was underway successfully in maize and sorghum. Undertaking this hybridization was important because the first generation of hybrids is typically more vigorous and productive than either parent.

For the rest of his life Yuan devoted himself to the research and development of better rice varieties.

The biggest problem was that rice is a self-pollinating plant. Hybridization requires separate male and female plants as parents. The small rice flowers contain both male and female parts. Although the male parts can be removed, carefully, by hand (to produce female-only flowers), this is not practical on a large scale. It was thus difficult to produce hybrid rice in large quantities. In 1961 he spotted a seed-head of wild hybrid rice. By 1964, Yuan hypothesized that naturally-mutated male-sterile rice could exist and could be used for the creation of new hybrid rice varieties. He and a student spent the summer searching for male sterile rice plants. Two years later he reported in a scientific publication that he had found a few individuals of male-sterile rice with potential for production of hybrid rice. Subsequent experiments proved his original hypothesis feasible, which proved to be his most important contribution to hybrid rice.

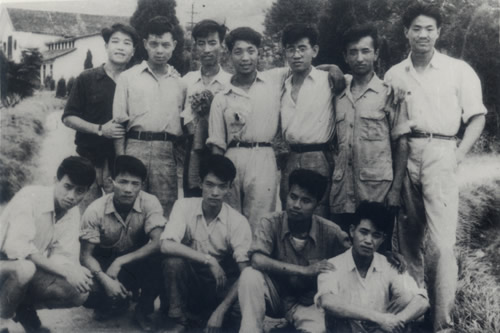
Yuan Longping in 1953 in Southwest University. Yuan is in the back row, third from the left.

Yuan went on to solve more problems over the next decades to achieve higher yielding hybrid rice. This took more than a decade. The first experimental hybrid rice did not show any significant advantage over commonly grown varieties, so Yuan suggested crossbreeding cultivated rice varieties with ones growing wild in the countryside. In 1970, beside a railway line in Hainan, he and his team found a particularly important wild variety. Using this one within a breeding programme resulted in varieties with yields improved by 20 - 30% in the late 1970s. For this achievement, Yuan Longping was dubbed the "Father of Hybrid Rice."

At present, as much as 50 percent of China's total number of rice paddies grow Yuan Longping's hybrid rice and these hybrid rice paddies yield 60 percent of the total rice production in China. China's total rice output rose from 56.9 million tons in 1950 to 194.7 million tons in 2017. The annual yield increase is enough to feed 70 million additional people.

The "Super Rice" Yuan worked on improving showed a 30 percent higher yield, compared to common rice, with a record yield of 17,055 kilograms per hectare being registered in Yongsheng County in Yunnan Province in 1999.

In January 2014, Yuan said in an interview that genetically modified food would be the future direction of food and that he had been working on genetic modification of rice.

== Early stages of hybrid rice experiments ==
=== Ideology ===
As recently as the 1950s, two separate theories of heredity were taught in China. One theory was from Gregor Mendel and Thomas Hunt Morgan and was based on the concept of genes and alleles. The other theory was from Soviet Union scientists Ivan Vladimirovich Michurin and Trofim Lysenko which stated that organisms would change over the course of their lives to adapt to environmental changes they experienced and their offspring would then inherit the changes. At the time, the Chinese government's official stance on scientific theories was one of "leaning towards the Soviet side", and any ideology from the Soviet Union was deemed to be the only truth while everything else would be seen as being invalid. Yuan, as an agricultural student at Southwest University, remained skeptical on both theories and started his own experiments to try and come up with his own conclusions.

Yuan was taught and mentored by some biologists who followed the ideas of Gregor Mendel and Thomas Hunt Morgan. These included Guan Xianghuan at Southwest Agricultural College and, later, Bao Wenkui at the Chinese Academy of Agricultural Sciences in Beijing. Both were persecuted. Guan took his own life in the 1960s while Bao was imprisoned. In 1962, Yuan visited Bao to discuss Mendelian genetics, and Bao gave him access to up-to-date foreign scientific literature. In 1966 Yuan himself was named as a counter-revolutionary and there were plans to imprison him. However, a letter of support for Yuan and his work was received based on his publication about male-sterile rice, sent from Nie Rongzhen, director of the National Science and Technology Commission. As a result, Yuan was allowed to continue his research and provided with both research assistants and financial support by the Hunan Provincial Party Committee leader Hua Guofeng and others. Yuan did not join the Communist Party during the Cultural Revolution or later.

Yuan's first experiments, before he became focused on rice, were on the sweet potato (Ipomoea batatas) and watermelons. Following Michurin's theory, he grafted Ipomoea alba (a plant with high photosynthesis rate and high efficiency in starch production) onto sweet potatoes. These plants grew substantially larger tubers than those of plants without I. alba grafts. However, when he planted seeds from these grafted sweet potatoes for a second generation, the tubers were normal sized from seeds of the sweet potato part of the plant, while seeds from the I. alba part did not grow sweet potatoes. He continued with similar grafting experiments on other plants, but none of the plants produced offspring with any mixtures of the beneficial traits grafted into their parents. This was in contradiction to the expectations of Michurin's theory. Yuan concluded, "I had learned some background of Mendel and Morgan's theory, and I knew from journal papers that it was proven by experiments and real agricultural applications, such as seedless watermelon. I desired to read more and learn more, but I can only do it secretly."

=== Famine ===
In 1959 China experienced the Great Chinese Famine. Yuan as an agricultural scientist could do little to greatly help people around him in Hunan province. "There was nothing in the field because hungry people took away all the edible things they can find. They eat grass, seeds, fern roots, or even white clay at the very extreme." He remembered the sight of those who had starved to death all his life. Yuan considered applying the inheritance rules onto sweet potatoes and wheat since their fast rate of growth made them the practical solutions for the famine. However, he realized that in Southern China sweet potato was never a part of the daily diet and wheat didn't grow well in that area. Therefore, he turned his mind to rice.

=== Heterosis ===
Back in 1906, geneticist George Harrison Shull experimented with hybrid maize. He observed that inbreeding reduced vigor and yield among the offspring but crossbreeding did the opposite. Those experiments proved the concept of heterosis. In the 1950s, geneticist J. C. Stephens and a few others hybridized two sorghum varieties found in Africa to create high-yielding offspring. Those results were inspiring for Yuan. However, maize and sorghum reproduce mainly through cross-pollination, while rice is a self-pollinating plant, which would make any crossbreeding attempts difficult, for obvious reasons. In Edmund Ware Sinnott's book Principles of Genetics, it clearly states that self-pollinating plants, like wheat and rice, have experienced long-term selection both by nature and by humans. Therefore, traits that were inferior were all excluded, and the remaining traits were all superior. He speculated that there would be no advantage in crossbreeding rice, and that the nature of self-pollination makes it hard to do cross breed experiments on rice on a large scale.

== Contributions ==
Yuan was both professionally and personally interested in rice production. He spent a majority of his time in the field, rather than staying confined in a lab or publishing papers. As such, he played a large role in Chinese agriculture by mentoring and leading others in the field, which helped foster future achievements in Chinese agriculture.

In 1979, his technique for hybrid rice was introduced into the United States, making it the first case of intellectual property rights transfer in the history of the People's Republic of China.

The United Nations Food and Agriculture Organization 1991 statistics show that 20 percent of the world's rice output came from 10 percent of the world's rice fields that grow hybrid rice.

Yuan advocated for sharing the success of his breakthroughs with other nations. He and his team donated crucial rice strains to the International Rice Research Institute in 1980. These donated strains were used to create hybrid rice strains that could sustain and grow in tropical countries to help their food supply chains. In addition to donating important rice strains, Yuan and his team taught farmers in other countries to grow and cultivate hybrid rice.

At present, the annual planting area of hybrid rice in China is about 230 million acres, accounting for 50% of the total rice planting area, and the output accounts for 57% of the total rice production. This increases the country's grain production by more than 20 billion kilograms every year, which is equivalent to the annual total grain production of a medium-sized province. Due to the great success of hybrid rice, he has won eight international awards, including the only National Special Invention Award and the UNESCO "Science Award", and is known as the "Father of Hybrid Rice" internationally.

== Honors and awards ==
Four asteroids and a college in China have been named after him. The minor planet 8117 Yuanlongping was also named after him.

In 2017, he became a laureate of the Asian Scientist 100 by the Asian Scientist.

For his achievements, Yuan was awarded the 2011 Mahathir Science Award. The award was presented by Malaysian former Prime Minister Mahathir Mohamad.

Yuan won the State Preeminent Science and Technology Award of China in 2000, the Wolf Prize in Agriculture and the World Food Prize in 2004.

He was the Director-General of the China National Hybrid Rice R&D Center and appointed Professor at Hunan Agricultural University, Changsha. He was a member of the Chinese Academy of Engineering, foreign associate of the U.S. National Academy of Sciences (2006) and the 2006 CPPCC.

Yuan worked as the chief consultant for the FAO in 1991.

== Personal life ==
Yuan married one of his students, Deng Ze (邓则) in 1964. They had three sons, among them Yuan Ding'an (袁定安) and Yuan Dingjiang (袁定江).

== Death ==
Activities in memory of Yuan Longping

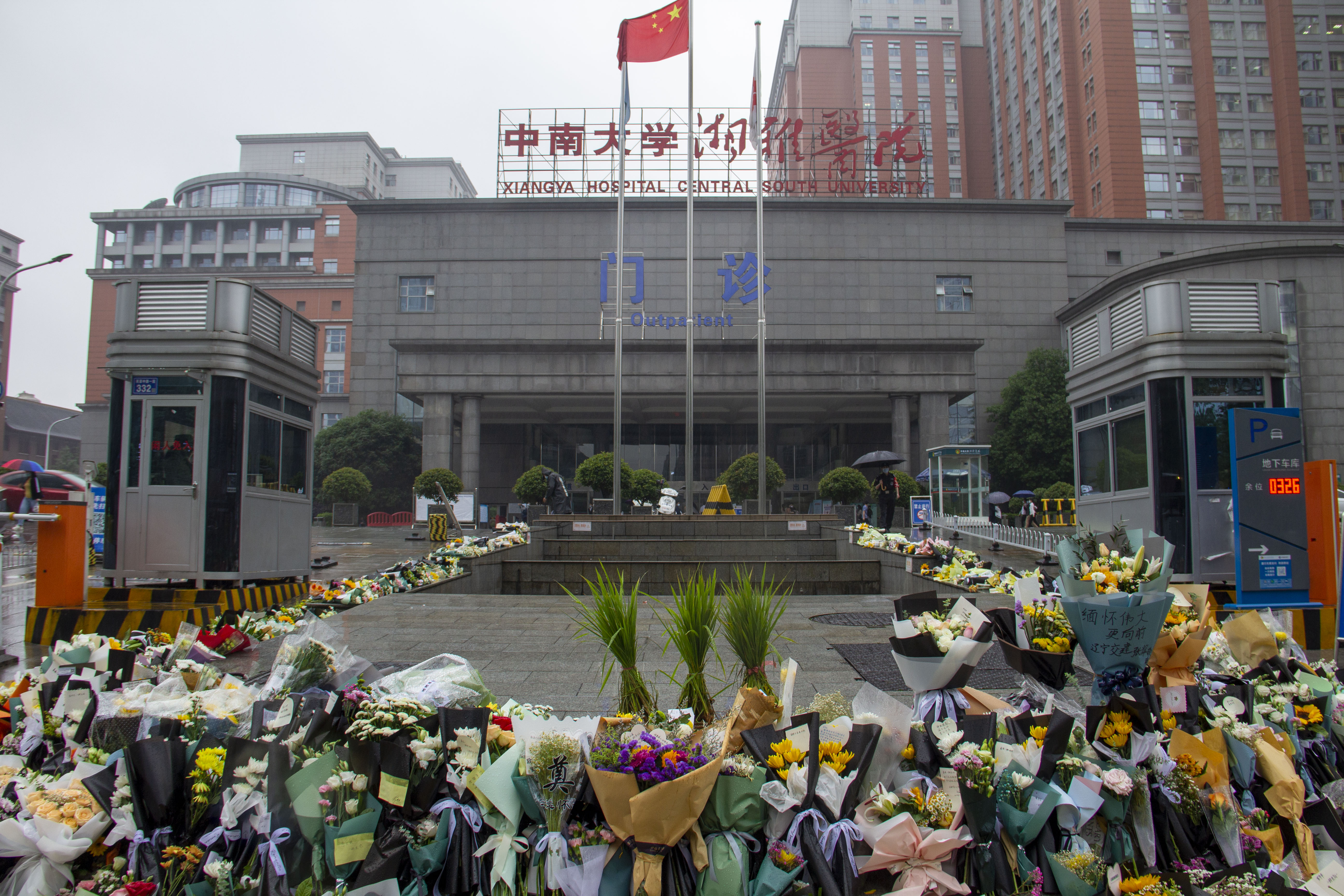
Flowers as well as rice given by the public outside Xiangya Hospital after the death of Yuan.

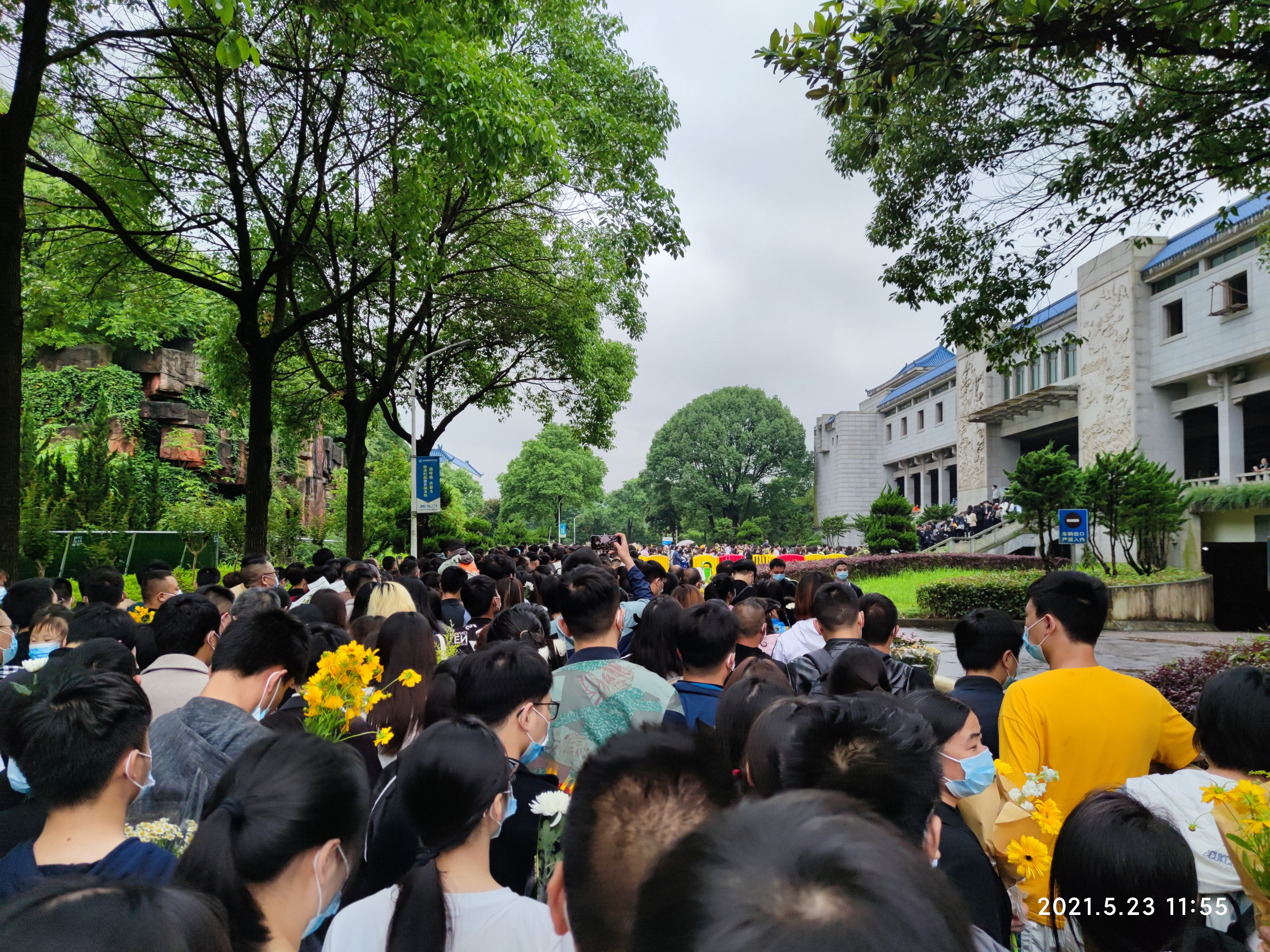
People came to the Changsha Mingyangshan Funeral Parlour to mourn Yuan Longping, on 23 May 2021.

On March 10, 2021, Yuan Longping collapsed at his hybrid rice research base in Sanya. On April 7, he was transferred to Changsha, Hunan Province for treatment. At 13:07 on May 22, Yuan Longping died of multiple organ failure at Xiangya Hospital of Central South University at the age of 90. Considered a national hero, tens of thousands of people sent flowers to the funeral home.

Honorary titles
Preceded by Catherine Bertini	World Food Prize; 2004	Succeeded by Modadugu Vijay Gupta
