= Yao Shouzhuo =

- 姚守拙
- Born: 6 March 1936; Songjiang County, Shanghai, China
- Died: 27 August 2025 (aged 89); Changsha, Hunan, China
- Education: Nankai University; Saint Petersburg State University
- Scientific career
- Fields: Analytical chemistry
- Workplaces: Tsinghua University; Hunan University

Yao Shouzhuo (Chinese: 姚守拙; pinyin: Yáo Shǒuzhuō; 6 March 1936 – 27 August 2025) was a Chinese analytical chemist and politician who was a professor at Tsinghua University, Hunan University and Hunan Normal University, and an academician of the Chinese Academy of Sciences.

Yao was a delegate to the 8th National People's Congress. He was a member of the 9th National Committee of the Chinese People's Political Consultative Conference and a member of the Standing Committee of the 10th Chinese People's Political Consultative Conference. He was vice chairperson of the 8th and 9th Hunan Provincial Committee of the Chinese People's Political Consultative Conference. He was a member of the Standing Committee of the 12th and 13th Central Committees of the Chinese Peasants' and Workers' Democratic Party.

== Biography ==
Yao was born in Songjiang County (now Songjiang District), Shanghai, on 6 March 1936. His grandfather was killed by Japanese soldiers during the Japanese invasion of China. In 1952, he was accepted to Nankai University, two years later, he was sent to study at Leningrad State University (now Saint Petersburg State University) on government scholarships.

Yao returned to China in 1959 and became a professor at Tsinghua University. In 1962, he moved to Hunan University. In 1970, he was sentenced for the crime of collaborating with the enemy and betraying the country. During his imprisonment, he completed the development of the "sulfur-absorbing battery", established a laboratory for testing non-ferrous metals and other raw materials at Hunan Motor Factory, and authored a book titled "Practical Rapid Chemical Analysis for Factories". He was rehabilitated in 1979. He joined the Chinese Peasants' and Workers' Democratic Party in 1986. In 1997, he was recruited as a professor at Hunan Normal University, serving in the post until his retirement in September 2018.

On 27 August 2025, Yao died in Changsha, Hunan, at the age of 89.

== Honours and awards ==
- November 1999 Member of the Chinese Academy of Sciences (CAS)
