= Huitong Covered Bridge =

Covered bridge in Hunan, China

Huitong Covered Bridge 惠同廊桥
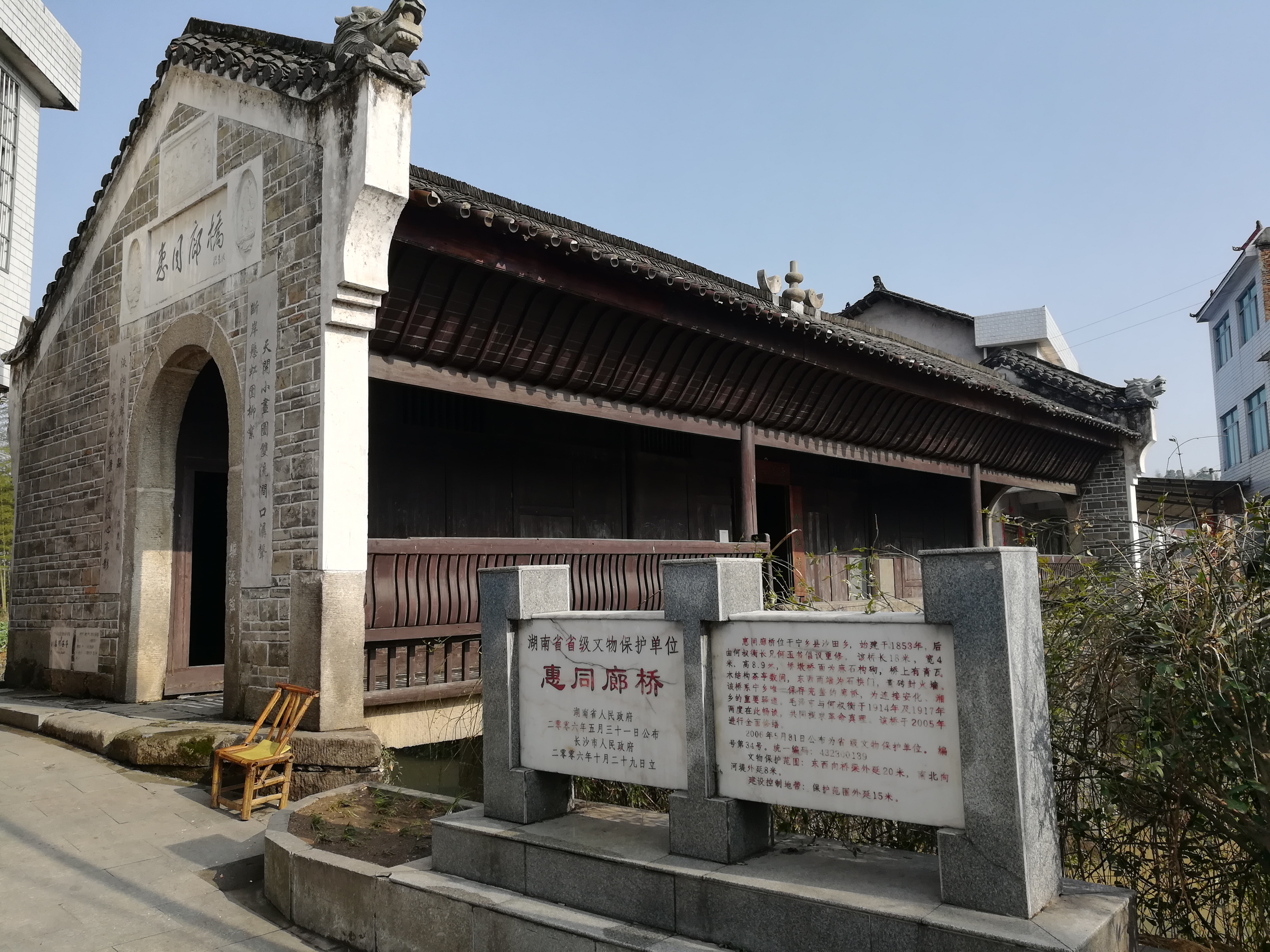
- Huitong Covered Bridge
- Coordinates: 28°04′00.9″N 112°01′48.52″E
- Crosses: Juanshui River

Characteristics
- Total length: 18 m (59 ft)
- Width: 4 m (13 ft)
- Height: 8.9 m (29 ft)

History
- Construction end: 1853
- Rebuilt: 1883

The Huitong Covered Bridge (simplified Chinese: 惠同廊桥; traditional Chinese: 惠同廊橋; pinyin: Huìtóng Lángqiáo) is a covered bridge over the Juanshui Stream in Shatian Township of Ningxiang, Hunan, China. It was built in the late Qing dynasty (1644–1911) and is 18 metres (59 ft) long, 4 metres (13 ft) wide and 8.9 metres (29 ft) high. It was listed on the "Cultural Relics Protection Units in Hunan Province" on October 10, 1983.

== History ==
The Huitong Covered Bridge was built in 1883 in the late Qing dynasty (1644–1911). The bridge is made of blue bricks and stone. The bridge is engraved with centipedes, the natural enemy of snakes and dragons, symbolizing relief from floods. Ancient Chinese people believed that floods were caused by dragons. In front of the bridge, a wooden plaque with a couplet is hung on the two side pillars. It was written by Qing dynasty scholar Yue Haodong (Chinese: 岳灏东).

In 1914 and 1917, Mao Zedong and He Shuheng talked twice on the bridge.

On October 10, 1983, it has been designated as a Cultural Relics Protection Unit in Hunan Province by the Hunan Provincial Government.

== Gallery ==
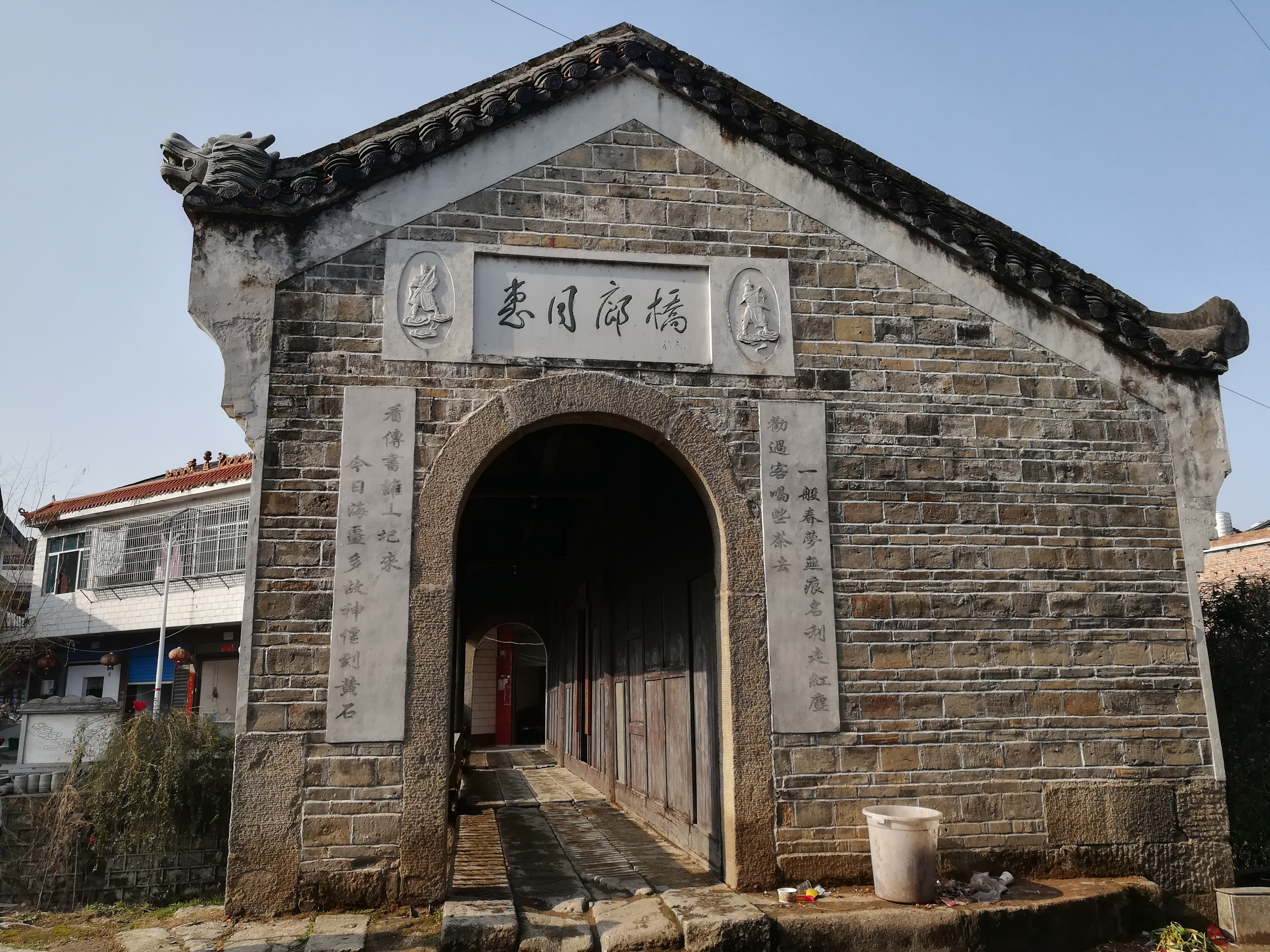
Huitong Covered Bridge.

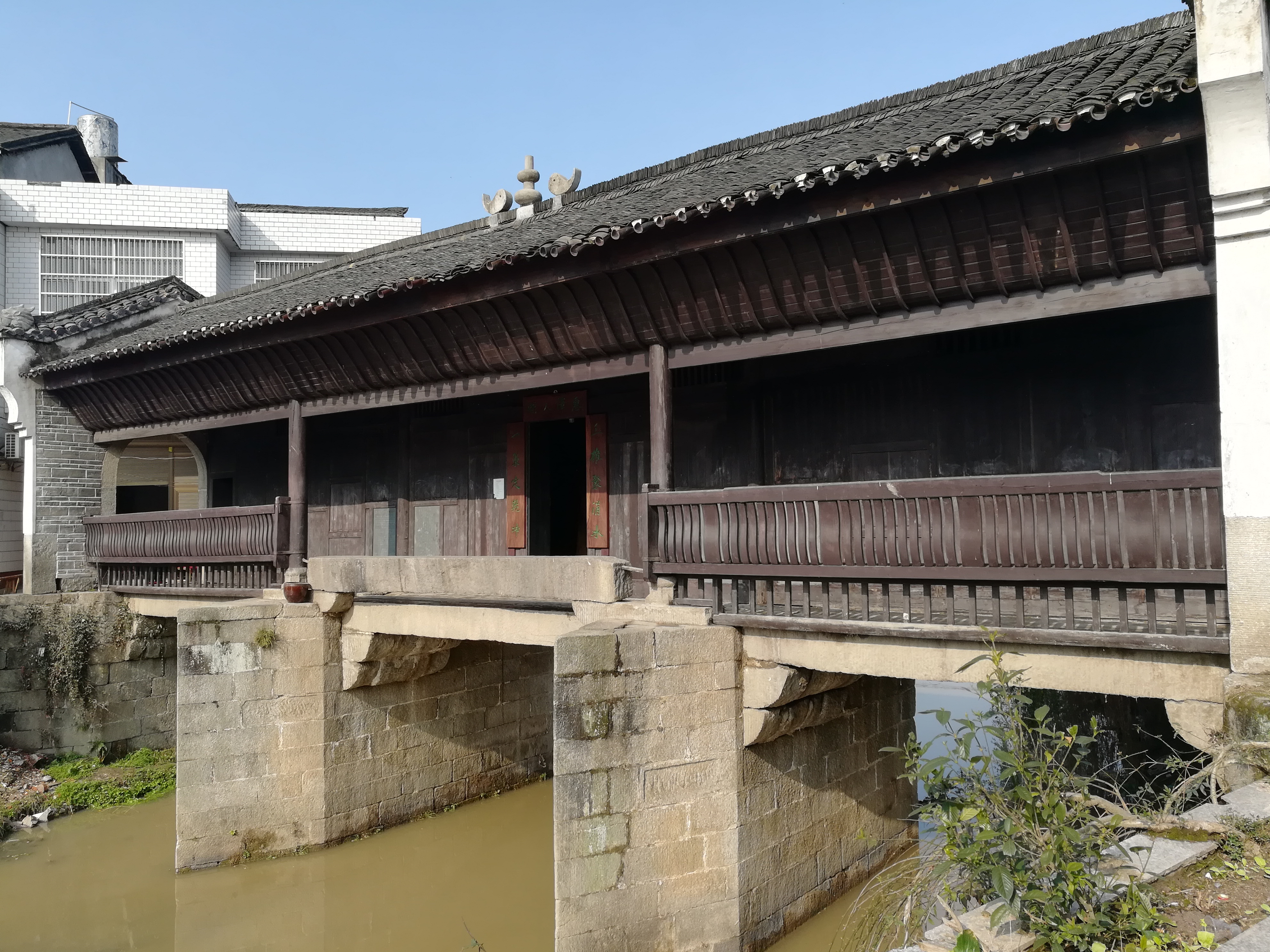
Huitong Covered Bridge.

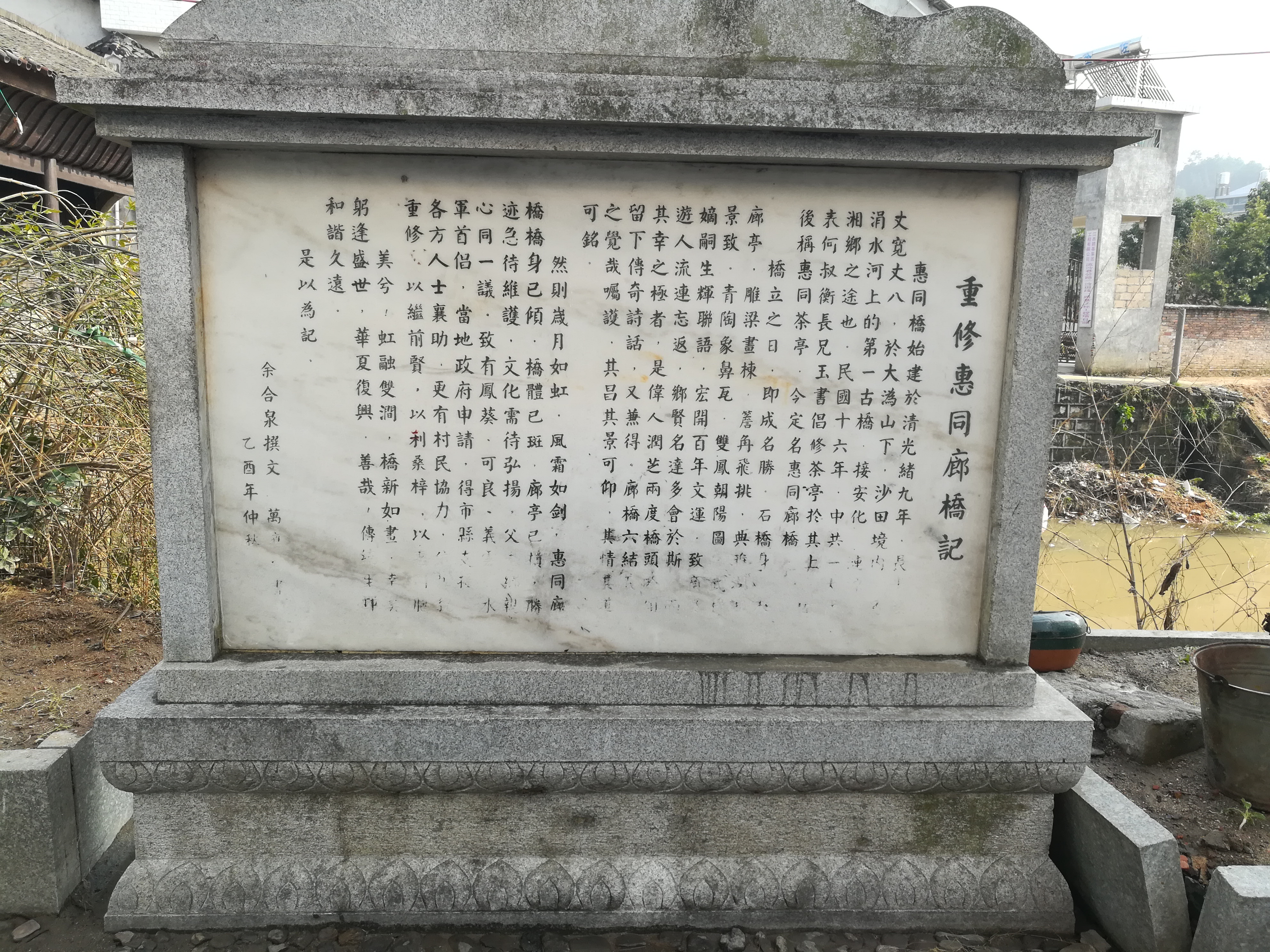
A stone tablet in front of the Huitong Covered Bridge.

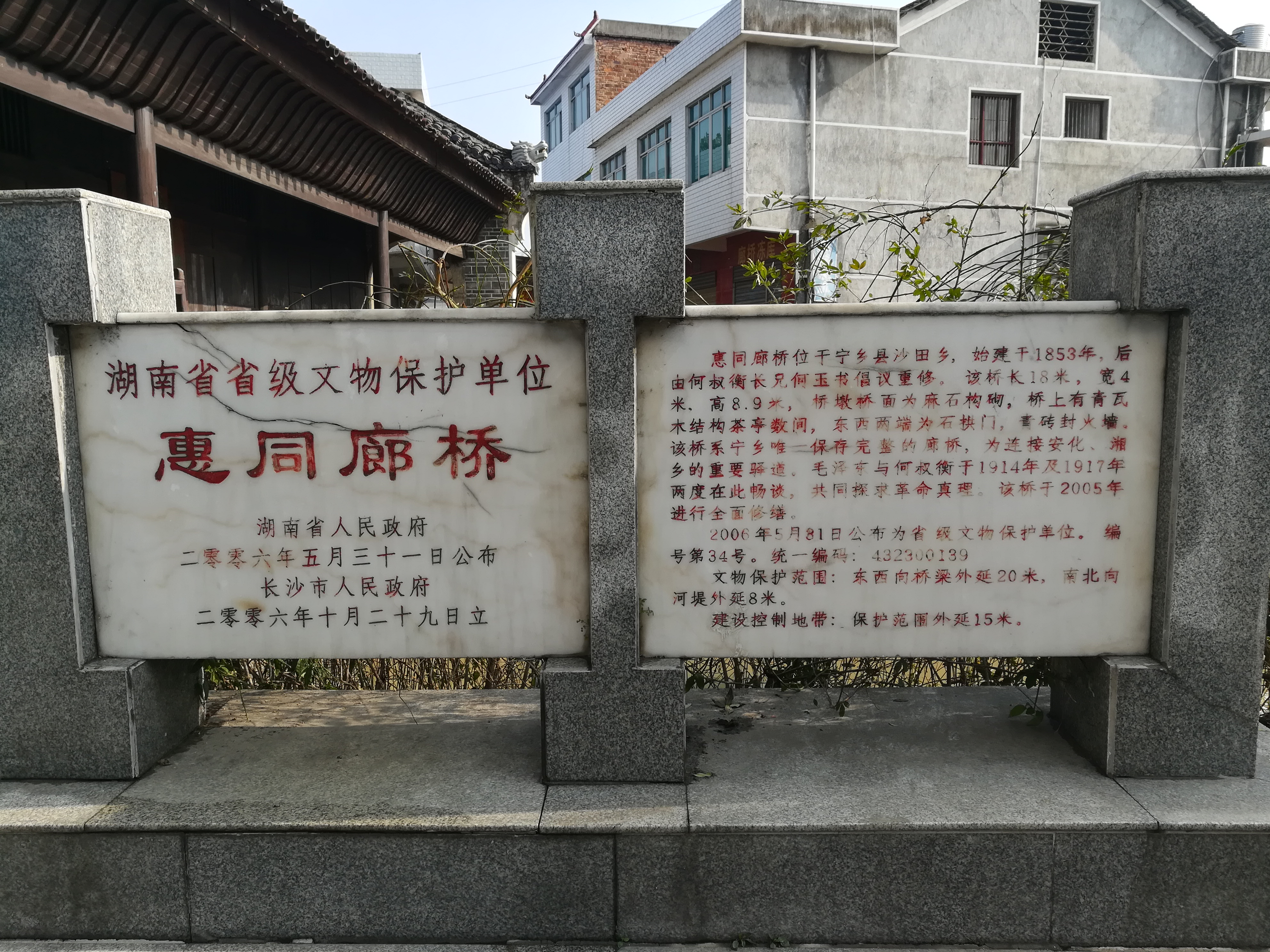
Stone tablet in front of the Huitong Covered Bridge.
