= Zheng Peimin =

Chinese politician

Zheng Peimin (July 23, 1943 – March 11, 2002, Chinese: 郑培民) was a Chinese politician. Born in Hailong County, Jilin Province, with ancestral roots in Wu'an, Hebei, he served as Deputy Secretary of the Hunan Provincial Committee of the Chinese Communist Party and Executive Vice Chairman of the Standing Committee of the Hunan Provincial People's Congress.

== Background ==
In 1962, Zheng was admitted to the Physics Department of Jilin University. After graduating in 1968, he briefly served in the military before being assigned to work at Xiangtan Electric Machinery Factory in Hunan Province in 1970. In 1981, he was selected for advanced studies at the Department of Economic Management Engineering of Tsinghua University. Upon returning to Xiangtan, he was promoted to deputy secretary of the CPC Xiangtan Municipal Committee in 1983, and later promoted to secretary. In 1990, he served as secretary of the CPC Xiangxi Tujia and Miao Autonomous Prefecture. In October 1992, he was appointed as Vice Governor of the Hunan Provincial People's Government, in charge of education, agriculture, etc. In October 1995, he was appointed as Deputy Secretary of the Hunan Provincial Committee of the Chinese Communist Party, in charge of publicity, etc. In 2001, he assumed the position of Executive Vice Chairman of the Standing Committee of the Hunan Provincial People's Congress, effectively leading the body. Zheng Peimin passed away in Beijing on March 11, 2002, from a sudden myocardial infarction. After his death, Zheng Peimin was established as a propaganda model and ranked first in the CCTV's "Touching China Annual Person of the Year Award" selection that year. His story was adapted into a film directed by Zheng Dongtian. In 2006, the Organization Department of the CPC Central Committee posthumously awarded him the title of "National Outstanding Communist Party Member."
