= Li Weiwei =

Li Weiwei may refer to:

- Li Weiwei (politician) (born 1958), Chinese politician from Hunan
- Li Weiwei (handballer) (born 1982), Chinese handball player
- Li Weiwei (volleyball) (born 1994), Chinese volleyball player
