= Hu Biao =

Chinese politician

- 胡彪

Chairman of the Hunan Provincial Committee of the Chinese People's Political Consultative Conference
- In office January 2003 – January 2013
- Preceded by: Wang Keying
- Succeeded by: Chen Qiufa

Deputy Communist Secretary of Hunan
- In office December 1996 – November 2001
- Leader: Wang Maolin; Yang Zhengwu
- Succeeded by: Wen Xuande

Secretary General of CPC Hunan Provincial Committee
- In office March 1993 – October 1995
- Leader: Xiong Qingquan; Wang Maolin
- Succeeded by: Wu Xiangdong

Communist Party Secretary of Huaihua
- In office January 1990 – March 1993
- Preceded by: Wu Yanfan
- Succeeded by: Qi Heping

Personal details
- Born: May 1947 (age 79) Shaoyang County, Hunan, China
- Party: Chinese Communist Party
- Children: Hu Xiongjie
- Education: Central Party School of the Chinese Communist Party

Hu Biao (Chinese: 胡彪; pinyin: Hú Biāo; born May 1947) is a retired Chinese politician who served as chairman of the Hunan Provincial Committee of the Chinese People's Political Consultative Conference from 2003 to 2013. He was an alternate of the 16th Central Committee of the Chinese Communist Party. He was a delegate to the 16th and 17th National Congress of the Chinese Communist Party. He was a member of the 10th and 11th National Committee of the Chinese People's Political Consultative Conference.

Hu was a powerful provincial official in home-province Hunan and was a close ally of Zhou Benshun. Under the influence of his power, his son Hu Xiongjie became a billionaire with eight companies, involving finance, real estate, engineering and other aspects.

== Biography ==
He was born in Shaoyang County, Hunan, in May 1947.

Hu entered the workforce in August 1965, and joined the Chinese Communist Party in February 1966.

He began his political career in Shaoyang and five years later was admitted to member of the standing committee of the CPC Shaoyang Municipal Committee, the city's top authority.

In July 1979, he was transferred to southwest China's Tibet Autonomous Region and appointed deputy director of the Policy Research Office of the Party Committee, but having held the position for only a year and a half.

In February 1981, he was transferred back to Shaoyang and appointed secretary general of both CPC Shaoyang Municipal Committee and Shaoyang Municipal People's Government. He was also a member of the standing committee of the CPC Shaoyang Municipal Committee. In December 1983, he rose to become vice mayor of Shaoyang. In February 1986, he was appointed deputy leader of the neighboring Huaihua city, and then party secretary, the top political position in the city, beginning in January 1990.

In March 1993, he was admitted to member of the standing committee of the CPC Hunan Provincial Committee, the province's top authority, concurrently holding the secretary general position. In December 1996, he was elevated to deputy party secretary of Hunan. Hu became a close ally of Zhou Benshun. In 1999, his son Hu Xiongjie was introduced to Zhou Jing (周靖), son of Zhou Benshun. Since then, Hu Xiongjie and Zhou Jing began to expand their business empire in Hunan. In January 2003, he was promoted to chairman of the Hunan Provincial Committee of the Chinese People's Political Consultative Conference, the provincial advisory body, serving in the post until January 2013.

== Personal life ==
His son Hu Xiongjie has eight companies in Hunan, involving finance, real estate, engineering and other aspects. He is called by medias as "the Second Generation Richest Official in Hunan with a Fortune of One Billion" (身家10亿的湘省官二代首富). On the afternoon of 24 July 2015, Hu Xiongjie was taken away by the Ministry of Public Security for investigation together with Zhou Jing at Xingsha Porsche Center in Changsha.

Party political offices
Preceded by Wu Yanfan	Communist Party Secretary of Huaihua; 1990–1993	Succeeded by Qi Heping
Preceded by ?	Secretary General of CPC Hunan Provincial Committee; 1993–1995	Succeeded by Wu Xiangdong
Preceded by ?	Deputy Communist Secretary of Hunan; 1996–2001	Succeeded by Wen Xuande
Assembly seats
Preceded by Wang Keying	Chairman of the Hunan Provincial Committee of the Chinese People's Political Consultative Conference; 2003–2013	Succeeded by Chen Qiufa
