= Zhu Guoxian =

Chinese politician

- 朱国贤

Chairman of the Jilin Provincial Committee of the Chinese People's Political Consultative Conference
- Incumbent
- Assumed office January 2023
- Preceded by: Jiang Zelin

Personal details
- Born: September 1964 (age 62) Yiwu County, Zhejiang, China
- Party: Chinese Communist Party
- Education: Zhejiang University

Chinese name
- Simplified Chinese: 朱国贤
- Traditional Chinese: 朱國賢
Transcriptions
Standard Mandarin
- Hanyu Pinyin: Zhū Guóxián

Zhu Guoxian (Chinese: 朱国贤; born September 1964) is a Chinese journalist and politician, serving as chairman of the Jilin Provincial Committee of the Chinese People's Political Consultative Conference since January 2023.

Zhu is a representative of the 20th National Congress of the Chinese Communist Party and a member of the 20th Central Committee of the Chinese Communist Party. He is a member of the 14th National Committee of the Chinese People's Political Consultative Conference.

== Career ==
Zhu was born in Yiwu County (now Yiwu), Zhejiang, in September 1964. After graduating from Hangzhou University (now Zhejiang University) in 1986, Zhu worked in the branches of Xinhua News Agency for a long time. He joined the Chinese Communist Party (CCP) in January 1986.

In February 2016, Zhu was transferred to the Central Commission for Discipline Inspection (CCDI), the party's internal disciplinary body. In July of that same year, he succeeded Chen Xiaojiang as head of the Publicity Department of the Central Commission for Discipline Inspection and the National Supervisory Commission, a position at vice-ministerial level.

Zhu was appointed head of the Publicity Department of the CCP Zhejiang Provincial Committee in October 2018 and was admitted to standing committee member of the CCP Zhejiang Provincial Committee, the province's top authority.

In November 2021, Zhu wastransferred to central China's Hunan province and chosen as specifically-designated deputy party secretary, replacing Ulan.

In January 2023, Zhu moved to northeast China's Jilin province and assumed position of chairman of the Jilin Provincial Committee of the Chinese People's Political Consultative Conference, the provincial advisory body.

On 29 October 2026, at the fifth plenary session of the 20th CCP Central Committee, he was elected as a member of the Central Committee.

Party political offices
Preceded by Chen Xiaojiang	Head of the Publicity Department of the Central Commission for Discipline Inspection and the National Supervisory Commission; 2018	Succeeded by Mo Gaoyi
Preceded by Ge Huijun	Head of the Publicity Department of Zhejiang Provincial Committee of the Chinese Communist Party; 2018–2021	Succeeded by Wang Gang
Preceded by Ulan	Specifically-designated Deputy Communist Party Secretary of Hunan; 2021–2023	Succeeded by Li Dianxun
Incumbent
Assembly seats
Preceded by Jiang Zelin	Chairman of the Jilin Provincial Committee of the Chinese People's Political Consultative Conference; 2023–present	Incumbent
