= BRICS Universities League =

Consortium of research universities

- Formation: June 6, 2013; 13 years ago
- Founded at: Fudan University, Shanghai, China
- Type: Education and Research
- Headquarters: Beijing Normal University, Beijing, China
- Location: BRICS
- Members: 60 Universities from BRICS
- Website: nu-brics.ru

BRICS Universities League is a consortium of leading research universities from BRICS countries including Brazil, Russia, India, China, and South Africa. Initiated at Fudan University, Shanghai on July 6, 2013, the League aims to become a platform for academic and expert cooperation, comparative research, and international educational projects. In October 2015, around 40 outstanding universities from the five BRICS countries gathered in Beijing Normal University, Beijing to hold the BRICS Universities Presidents Forum. After this Forum, the participating universities declared the Beijing Consensus, and they decided to establish the BRICS Universities League. The League Secretariat is located in Beijing Normal University, with the BNU as a leading university in terms of BRICS higher education and academic cooperation. The League is expanding to attract more and more outstanding BRICS universities to participate in its activities. The BRICS Universities League has performed as a strategic pillar for the BRICS cooperation.

== Recent developments ==
In the years following its establishment, the League has expanded its activities significantly. In 2024 a new event — the BRICS+ Universities Rectors' Forum — was held for the first time at Lomonosov Moscow State University, Russia, bringing together rectors and presidents of BRICS and BRICS-partner universities. The 2025 edition will take place in Rio de Janeiro (5-7 June) under the theme “Education, Artificial Intelligence, Sustainable Development, Inclusion, Diversity, Poverty Alleviation and Standardisation in the BRICS+ Space”.

In March 2024, a wider initiative — the BRICS+ Universities Association — was launched to include not only core BRICS universities but also partner-country universities across Asia, Africa and Latin America, aiming at a broader “BRICS+” higher education network.

According to a 2025 analysis, BRICS-based universities are increasing their international visibility and shifting from regional to global scale research cooperation, assisted by networks such as the League.

== Current members ==
=== Brazil ===
University	Location	Year founded	Note
Federal University of Minas Gerais	Belo Horizonte	1927	
Federal University of Rio de Janeiro	Rio de Janeiro	1920	
Federal University of Rio Grande do Sul	Porto Alegre	1934	
Federal University of Santa Catarina	Santa Catarina	1960	
Federal University of Viçosa	Viçosa	1922	
Fluminense Federal University	Niterói	1960	
National Institute of Amazonian Research	Manaus	1952	
Pontifical Catholic University of Rio de Janeiro	Rio de Janeiro	1940	
University of Campinas	São Paulo	1964	

=== China ===
University	Location	Year founded	Note
Beijing Normal University	Beijing	1902	Project 985, Project 211, Double First Class University
Fudan University	Shanghai	1905	C9 League, Project 985, Project 211, Double First Class University
Harbin Engineering University	Harbin, Heilongjiang	1953	Project 211, Double First Class University
Hohai University	Nanjing, Jiangsu	1915	Project 211, Double First Class University
Huazhong University of Science and Technology	Wuhan, Hubei	1952	Project 985, Project 211, Double First Class University
Hunan University	Changsha, Hunan	1903	Project 985, Project 211, Double First Class University
Jiangsu Normal University	Xuzhou, Jiangsu	1952	Provincial Public University
Jilin University	Changchun, Jilin	1946	Project 985, Project 211, Double First Class University
North China University of Water Resources and Electric Power	Zhengzhou, Henan	1951	Provincial Public University
Northeast Forestry University	Harbin, Heilongjiang	1952	Project 211, Double First Class University
Sichuan University	Chengdu, Sichuan	1896	Project 985, Project 211, Double First Class University
Southwest University	Chongqing	1906	Project 211, Double First Class University
Yanshan University	Qinhuangdao, Hebei	1920	Provincial Public University
Yunnan University	Kunming, Yunnan	1922	Project 211, Double First Class University
Zhejiang University	Hangzhou, Zhejiang	1897	C9 League, Project 985, Project 211, Double First Class University

=== India ===
University	Location	Year founded	Note
Banaras Hindu University	Varanasi, Uttar Pradesh	1916	
Indian Institute of Technology Bombay	Mumbai, Maharashtra	1958	
Indian Institute of Technology Kanpur	Kanpur, Uttar Pradesh	1959	
Indian Institute of Technology Kharagpur	Kharagpur, West Bengal	1951	
Indian Institute of Technology Roorkee	Roorkee, Uttarakhand	1847	
Indira Gandhi Institute of Development Research	Mumbai, Maharashtra	1987	
Jamia Millia Islamia	New Delhi	1920	
National Forensic Sciences University	Gandhinagar, Gujarat	2008	
National Institute of Technology Durgapur	Durgapur, West Bengal	1960	
National Institute of Technology Warangal	Warangal, Telangana	1959	
Rashtriya Raksha University	Gandhinagar, Gujarat	2009	Has 6 campuses across India
Tata Institute of Social Sciences	Mumbai, Maharashtra	1936	Has 3 campuses across India
TERI School of Advanced Studies	New Delhi	1998	
University of Delhi	New Delhi	1922	
Visvesvaraya National Institute of Technology	Nagpur, Maharashtra	1960	

=== Russia ===
University	Location	Year founded	Note
Higher School of Economics	Moscow	1992	
Information Technologies, Mechanics and Optics University	Saint Petersburg	1900	
Moscow State Institute of International Relations	Moscow	1944	
Moscow Institute of Physics and Technology	Moscow	1946	
National University of Science and Technology	Moscow	1918	
Moscow Power Engineering Institute	Moscow	1930	
Moscow State University	Moscow	1755	
Peoples' Friendship University of Russia	Moscow	1960	
Saint Petersburg State University	Saint Petersburg	1724	
Tomsk Polytechnic University	Tomsk	1896	
Tomsk State University	Tomsk	1878	
Ural Federal University	Yekaterinburg	1920	

=== South Africa ===
University	Location	Year founded	Note
Central University of Technology	Bloemfontein	1981	
Durban University of Technology	KwaZulu-Natal	2002	
North West University	Potchefstroom, Mahikeng and Vanderbijlpark	2004	
Rhodes University	Makhanda, Eastern Cape Province	1904	
Stellenbosch University	Stellenbosch, Western Cape	1918	
Tshwane University of Technology	Pretoria, Mbombela, Polokwane, Ga-Rankuwa, Soshanguve, Witbank (eMalahleni)	2004	
University of Cape Town	Cape Town, Western Cape	1829	
University of Johannesburg	Johannesburg	2005	
University of Limpopo	Limpopo Province	2005	
University of Pretoria	Pretoria	1908	
University of Venda	Thohoyandou, Limpopo province	1982	
University of Witwatersrand	Johannesburg	1922	
