= Zhang Dafang =

Zhang Dafang (simplified Chinese: 张大方; traditional Chinese: 張大方; pinyin: Zhāng dàfāng), or Dafang Zhang (surname last), is a computer science professor of Hunan University. He is also a former chairman of the Hunan Provincial Committee of the Jiusan Society of China, vice Chairman of the Hunan Provincial Committee of the Chinese People's Political Consultative Conference, and member of the Standing Committee of the National Committee of the Chinese People's Political Consultative Conference.

== Early life and education ==
Zhang Dafang was born in April 1959 in Shanghai. He began his career as a sent-down youth in Anhui Province in 1976. Later, he studied computer applications at Hefei University of Technology as a member of the Class of 1977 (China), and earned his Ph.D. in applied mathematics from Hunan University in 1997.

== Academic career ==
Zhang has held numerous academic positions at Hunan University, including:

- Professor of Computer Science
- Director of the Computer Science Department
- Dean of the College of Computer and Communication
- Founding Dean of the Software College

His research interests include: wireless network and mobile computing, Internet architecture and measurement, software fault tolerance and testing, and big data. Together with his team, he has published over 300 academic papers, with more than 200 indexed by SCI, EI, and ISTP.

== Political and professional roles ==
In 2008, Zhang Dafang was elected as a member of the Standing Committee of the 11th National Committee of the Chinese People's Political Consultative Conference, representing the Jiusan Society.

In January 2012, he was appointed as Vice Chairman of the Hunan Provincial Committee of the Chinese People's Political Consultative Conference.

In January 2018, he was elected as a member of the Standing Committee of the 13th National Committee of the Chinese People's Political Consultative Conference.

Since July 2013, he has been vice chairman of the Hunan Provincial Committee of the Chinese People's Political Consultative Conference, member of the Standing Committee of the Jiusan Society Central Committee, and chairman of the Hunan Provincial Jiusan Committee, and member of the Standing Committee of the National Committee of the Chinese People's Political Consultative Conference].

Zhang Dafang has also served in various governmental roles, including Deputy Director of the Hunan Provincial Information Industry Department and Vice Chairman of the Hunan Economic and Information Technology Commission. He is also the president of the Hunan Western Returned Scholars Association.
