= Li Weiwei (politician) =

Chinese politician

- 李微微

Chairperson of the Hunan Provincial Committee of the Chinese People's Political Consultative Conference
- In office January 2016 – January 2023
- Preceded by: Chen Qiufa
- Succeeded by: Mao Wanchun

Personal details
- Born: March 1958 (age 68) Ningxiang County, Hunan, China
- Party: Chinese Communist Party (1976–2025; expelled)
- Education: Hunan Normal University; Hunan University

Li Weiwei (Chinese: 李微微; pinyin: Lǐ Wēiwēi, born March 1958) is a Chinese politician who served as the chairwoman of the Hunan Provincial Committee of the Chinese People's Political Consultative Conference.

== Biography ==
Li was born in Ningxiang County (now Ningxiang), Hunan, in March 1958. She joined the Chinese Communist Party (CCP) in 1976. In her youth, she worked in a people's commune in Zhuzhou County. She has a bachelor's degree in Chinese literature from Hunan Normal College. She worked as a teacher upon graduating, before joining the Communist Youth League organization in Zhuzhou. In 1990 she became deputy secretary of the Hunan provincial Youth League organization.

In 1995 she was named deputy commissioner (vice-mayor) of Huaihua. In 1997 she became involved in commerce; by 2000 she began working for the China Council for the Promotion of International Trade, Hunan division, becoming its head in 2003. In November 2006 she was named to the provincial Party Standing Committee of Hunan, concurrently head of the Hunan United Front Department. In August 2015, in a provincial leadership reshuffle, she was named Secretary of the Political and Legal Affairs Commission (Zhengfawei) of Hunan province. In January 2016, she became chairwoman of the Hunan Provincial Committee of the Chinese People's Political Consultative Conference, the province's top political advisory body.

Li has an MBA and a doctorate in economics, both from Hunan University.

=== Downfall ===
On 29 July 2024, Li has come under investigation for "serious violations of discipline and laws" by the Central Commission for Discipline Inspection (CCDI), the party's internal disciplinary body, and the National Supervisory Commission, the highest anti-corruption agency of China.

On 24 January 2025, Li as expelled from the CCP and removed from public office. On February 8, she was detained by the Supreme People's Procuratorate.

On 3 February 2026, Li was sentenced to life imprisonment for bribery involving more than 117 million yuan ($16.87 million) by the 1st Intermediate People's Court of Hainan. She was also deprived of her political rights for life, and all of her personal assets were confiscated.

Party political offices
Preceded by Shi Yuzhen	Head of the United Front Department of the Hunan Provincial Committee of the Chinese Communist Party; 2006–2015	Succeeded by Huang Lanxiang
Preceded by Sun Jianguo	Secretary of the Hunan Provincial Political and Legal Affairs Commission; 2015–2016	Succeeded by Huang Guanchun
Assembly seats
Preceded by Chen Qiufa	Chairperson of the Hunan Provincial Committee of the Chinese People's Political Consultative Conference; 2016–2023	Succeeded by Mao Wanchun
