= Hunan University =

National public university in Changsha, Central China

Coordinates: 28°10′49″N 112°57′10″E

- 湖南大学
- Motto: 实事求是 敢为人先
- Motto in English: Seeking Truth from Facts and Daring to be Pioneers
- Type: Public university
- Established: Naming 1926; 100 years ago
- Affiliations: BRICS Universities League
- President: Duan Xianzhong (段献忠)
- Faculty: 4,000 (Autumn 2019)
- Students: 36,000 (Autumn 2019)
- Undergraduates: 20,000 (Autumn 2019)
- Postgraduates: 15,000 (Autumn 2019)
- Location: Yuelu, Changsha, Hunan, China
- Website: www-en.hnu.edu.cn

Chinese name
- Simplified Chinese: 湖南大学
- Traditional Chinese: 湖南大學
Transcriptions
Standard Mandarin
- Hanyu Pinyin: Húnán Dàxué

Hunan University (HNU; 湖南大学) is a national public university in Yuelu, Changsha, Hunan, China. It is affiliated with and funded by the Ministry of Education. The university is part of Project 211, Project 985, and the Double First-Class Construction. It is also a member in the BRICS Universities League.

== History ==
Yuelu Academy was founded in the year 976, during the Song dynasty, as a Confucian shuyuan.

In 1903, during the final years of the Qing dynasty, the Hunan Institute of Higher Education was established.

In 1926, the name of the institution was then changed to Hunan Normal College, and then Hunan Public Polytechnic School, before finally arriving at the name Hunan University.

In 1937, the academy was transformed from a provincial university into a national university, renamed the National Hunan University, and designated by the Ministry of education, becoming the fifteenth national university.

From April 1938 to May 1941, the National Hunan University suffered serious losses and, made it difficult to run the school. During the Battle of Changsha, the National Hunan University was suspended.

In 1949, the name Hunan University was again adopted, and the calligraphy of "Hunan University" was written by Mao Zedong in 1950 as soon as the People's Republic of China was founded.

In 1959, Hunan University was officially restored after the national readjustment of higher education institutions.

In 1963, HNU was subordinated to the First Ministry of Machinery Industry.

In 1978, Hunan University's status as one of the 88 National Key Universities in China was reaffirmed.

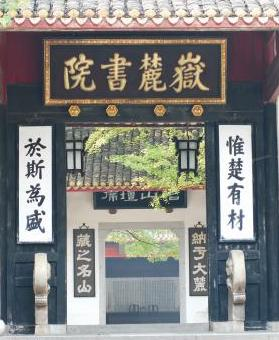
The entrance to Yuelu Academy

In 1996, Hunan University became one of the universities sponsored by Project 211.

In 2000, Hunan University was selected as a member of Project 985.

In November 2010, the National Supercomputing Changsha Center was built on the Hunan University campus under the management and operation of Hunan University. It is the first National Supercomputing Center in Central China and the third of its kind apart from other two national centers situated in Tianjin and Shenzhen.

In 2011, HNU participated in the Excellence League, an alliance of 10 Chinese universities with a strong background in engineering.

In 2015, HNU joined the BRICS Universities League, a consortium of leading research universities from BRICS countries.

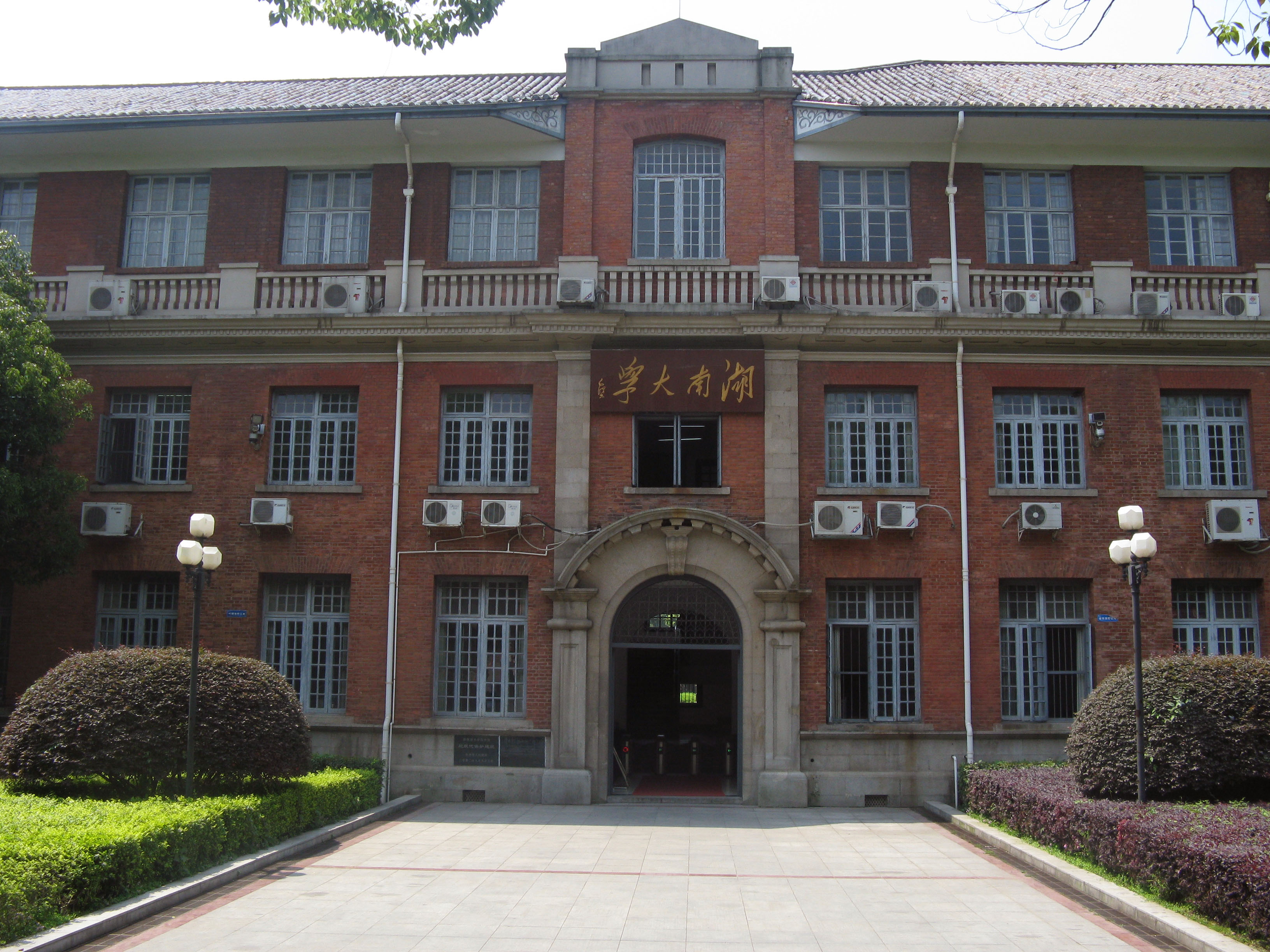
The Administration Building of Hunan University was designed by Liu Shiying (Chinese architect), the founder of modern architectural education in China.

In 2017, Hunan University was listed in the Double First-Class Construction.

== Academics and administration ==
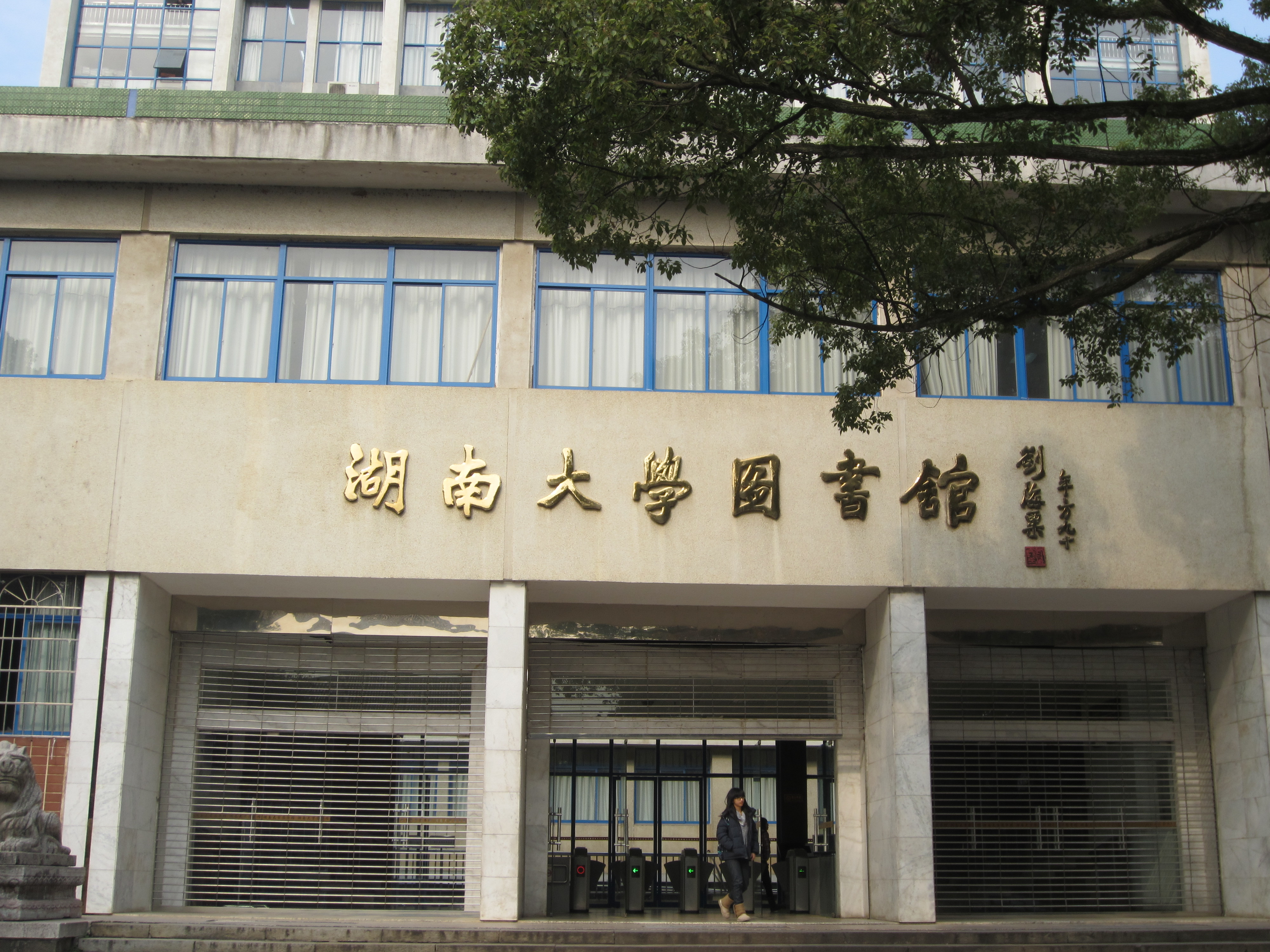
Hunan University Library

Hunan University is a national key university under the direct administration of the Ministry of Education of China and a member of Project 211 and Project 985, as well as the Double First Class University Plan. The administration is led by a CPC secretary and a president. The current secretary is Deng Wei, and the president is Duan Xianzhong.

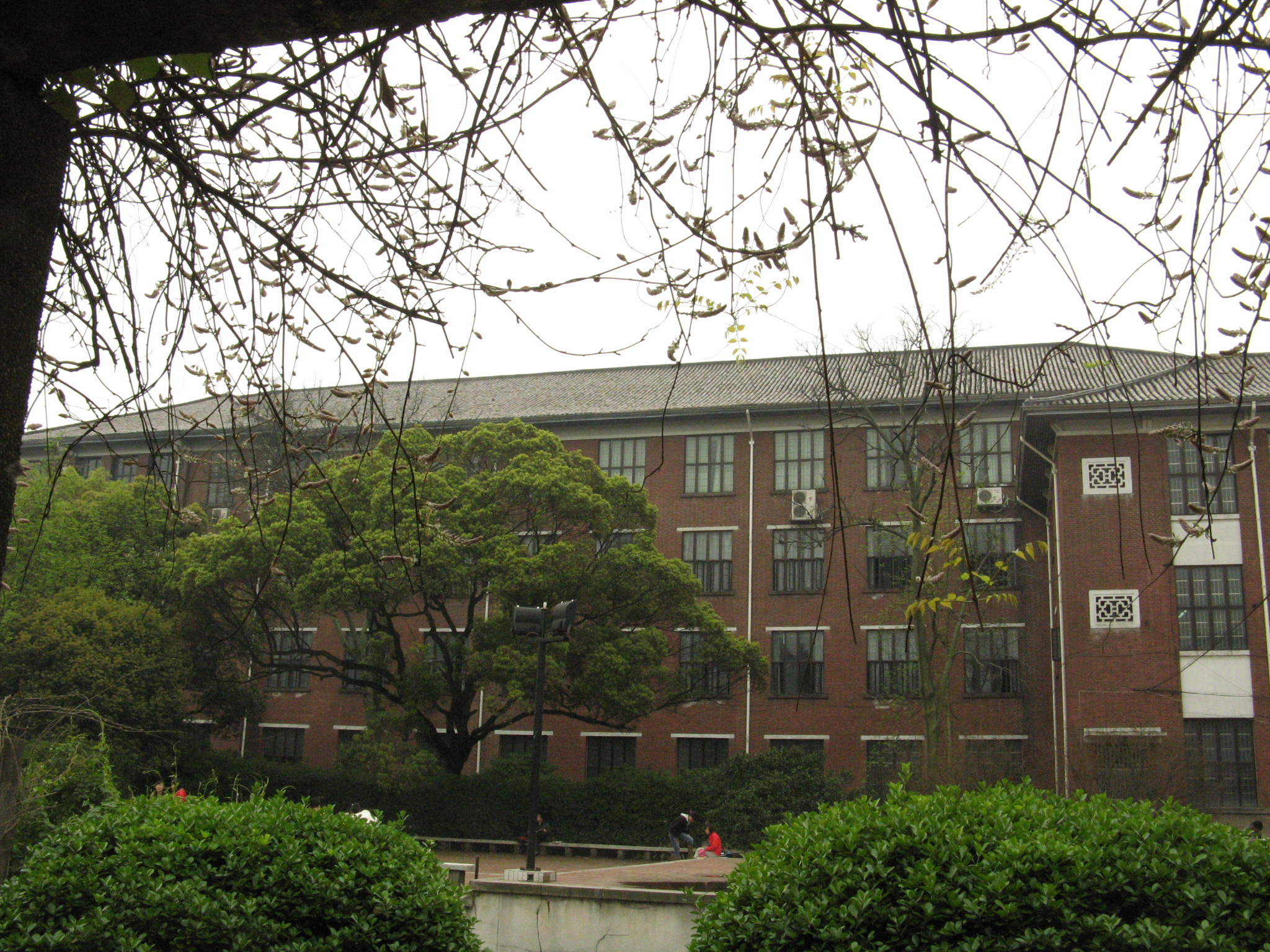
Central Teaching Building, at the south rim of the Central Quad, one of the major liberal arts teaching buildings

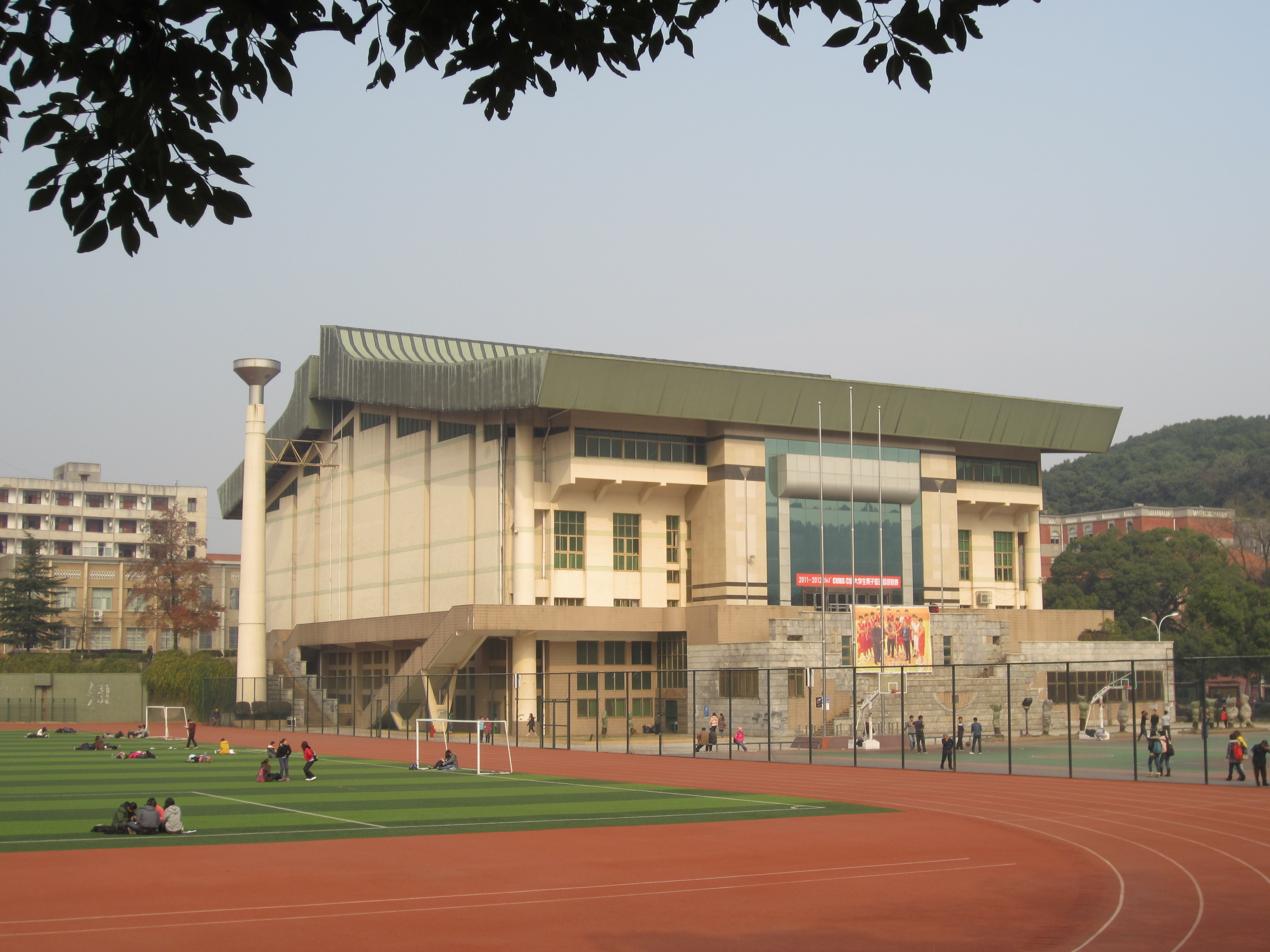
Hunan University Stadium

It has the following colleges and departments:

- Architecture
- Biology
- Business Administration
- Chemistry and Chemical Engineering
- Chinese Language and Literature
- Civil Engineering
- Computer Science and Electronic Engineering
- Design
- Economy and Trade
- Educational Science
- Electrical and Information Engineering
- Robotics
- Environmental Science and Engineering
- Finance and Statistics
- Foreign Languages and International Studies
- Journalism and Communication and Film and Television Arts
- Law
- Marxism Studies
- Mathematics and Econometrics
- Materials and Engineering
- Mechanical Vehicle Engineering
- Physical Education
- Public Administration
- Physics and Microelectronics Science
- Yuelu Academy
- Semiconductors (Integrated Circuits)
- Interdisciplinary Institute of Life Medicine
- Hunan University Library
- Hunan University Press

=== Students and Academics ===
There are more than 30,000 full-time students, including more than 20,800 undergraduates and more than 14,000 graduate students. Hunan University has started to recruit international students since 1990s and is one of the Project 985 universities in China to launch an international student program taught entirely in English.

== Rankings and reputation ==
University rankings
BCUR National	Domestic	29
Wu Shulian National	Domestic	25
CUAA National	Alumni	32
QS National	General	35
THE National	General	19
QS Asia (Asia version)	General	162
THE Asia (Asia version)	General	=60
ARWU World	Research	151–200
QS World	General	=477
THE World	General	263
USNWR World	General	=109

As of 2025, Hunan University was ranked in the top 200 research universities in the world by several global university rankings such as the Academic Ranking of World Universities (ARWU), the U.S. News & World Report Best Global University Ranking and the CWTS Leiden Ranking.

Hunan University was ranked 259th worldwide in 2024 in terms of aggregate performance by the three widely observed university ranking (THE+ARWU+QS) as reported by the Aggregate Ranking of Top Universities.

=== General Rankings ===
- In the 2025 Academic Ranking of World Universities (ARWU), Hunan University ranked #151 globally.
- As of 2025, the U.S. News & World Report Best Global University Ranking ranked Hunan University # 109 globally, #21 in Asia, and #12 in China.

=== Research Rankings ===
- Hunan University ranked 14th worldwide in the 2016 Nature Index Rising Stars. In 2018, Hunan University was elected among 16 universities in the world by Nature, called "Movers and Shakers". In the 2026 Nature Index Research Leaders, which measures the largest groups of papers published in 145 leading high-quality science journals, Hunan University ranked 37th among the leading academic institutions globally and 29th in the Asia-Pacific region.
- Hunan University was ranked 89th globally by the CWTS Leiden Ranking 2025 based on the number of their scientific publications in the period 2020–2023. For the proportion of their scientific publications that rank among the top 10% and 50% in their fields by citations in the 2024 CWTS Leiden Ranking Open Edition, Hunan University ranks 7th globally (1st in Eurasia) and 1st in the world, respectively.
- In 2020, a research paper by Loet Leydesdorff, a famous scientometrician, employs data from 205 China's leading research-intensive universities, including in the CWTS Leiden Ranking 2020, to classify them into three main groups: Top, Middle, and Bottom. Hunan University (with a Z-score of 10.2) ranks 2nd only to Tsinghua University (z=11.0), which leads the "High Group of 32 Universities".
- In 2022, 32 HNU faculty members were included in Clarivate's list of Highly Cited Researchers, placing HNU at No. 33 globally and third in China, behind only the Chinese Academy of Science and Tsinghua University.

=== Subject Rankings ===
- Hunan University has been ranked in the top 30 global universities in "engineering" by several international rankings, including the U.S. News Rankings, the URAP ranking, and the NTU Ranking. As of 2025, it was ranked #12 globally in "engineering" by the U.S. News Rankings.

== Notable alumni ==
Among its prominent alumni are

- Cai E, a major leader in defending the Republic of China
- Ci Yungui, the chief designer of China's first super computer
- Guo Songtao, China's first ambassador to a foreign country
- Wang Fuzhi, a celebrated philosopher in Chinese history
- Wei Yuan, a reformist who first advocated to learn from the West
- Xiong Xiaoge, the first person to introduce high-tech venture funds into China
- Zeng Guofan, the first Chinese to initiate the Modernization Movement (at the time called Yangwu Yundong, a movement to imitate overseas technology and industry) and to make arrangements for a modern factory in China
- Zhang Dafang, former vice Chairman of the Hunan Provincial Committee of the Chinese People's Political Consultative Conference
- Zhang Fengxuan, the first Chinese to set foot on the continent of Antarctica
- Zuo Zongtang, a national hero who arranged to build China's first modern navy and took great pains to defend and develop Xinjiang

== See also ==
- President of Hunan University
- Hunan University faculty
- Hunan University station
- List of universities in China
