= Cheng Xingling =

Chinese politician

Cheng Xingling (Chinese: 程星龄; 1900–1987) was a People's Republic of China politician. He was born in Liling, Hunan. He was a graduate of Peking University.

Preceded by Zhou Li	CPPCC Committee Chairman of Hunan; 1983–1987	Succeeded by Liu Zheng
