= Sun Guozhi =

Chinese politician

Sun Guozhi (Chinese: 孙国治; January 1917 – April 21, 2005) was a Chinese politician. He was born in Laiyuan County, Hebei. He was People's Congress Chairman of both his home province and Hunan.

Preceded by Liu Bingyan	People's Congress Chairman of Hebei; 1985–1988	Succeeded by Guo Zhi
Preceded by Mao Zhiyong	Governor of Hunan; 1979–1983	Succeeded by Liu Zheng
Preceded by Wan Da	People's Congress Chairman of Hunan; 1983–1985	Succeeded by Jiao Linyi
