= Xiong Qingquan =

Chinese politician (1927–2022)

- 熊清泉

Party Secretary of Hunan
- In office April 1988 – October 1993
- Preceded by: Mao Zhiyong
- Succeeded by: Wang Maolin

Governor of Hunan
- In office July 1985 – February 1989
- Preceded by: Liu Zheng
- Succeeded by: Chen Bangzhu

Personal details
- Born: 26 December 1927 Shuangfeng County, Hunan, China
- Died: 20 June 2022 (aged 94) Changsha, Hunan, China
- Party: Chinese Communist Party
- Education: National Teacher's College

Xiong Qingquan (Chinese: 熊清泉; pinyin: Xióng Qīngquán; 16 December 1927 – 20 June 2022) was a politician in the People's Republic of China. He was born in Shuangfeng County, Loudi, Hunan, then became Chinese Communist Party Committee Secretary (1988–1993), Governor of Hunan (1985–1989) and a delegate to the 7th National People's Congress (1988–1993). He died from an illness in Changsha at the age of 94.

== Bibliography ==
- 应南：《妙手丹青夕阳红--熊清泉书画艺术管见》，《人民日报》 2005年10月23日 第八版

Party political offices
Preceded by ?	Party Secretary of Chenzhou; 1980–1982	Succeeded by Gong Jie (龚杰)
Preceded by Mao Zhiyong	Governor of Hunan; 1988–1993	Succeeded by Wang Maolin
Government offices
Preceded by Liu Zheng	Party Secretary of Hunan; 1985–1989	Succeeded by Chen Bangzhu
