= Chen Qiufa =

Chinese aerospace engineer and politician

- 陈求发
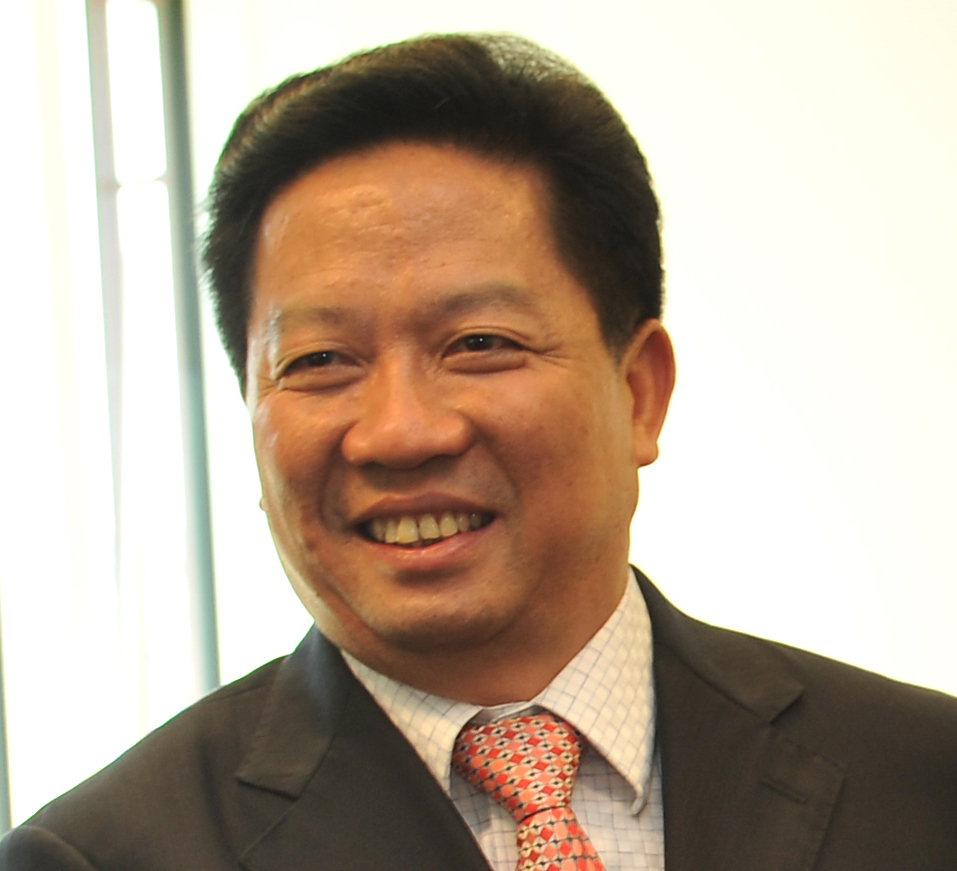

Party Secretary of Liaoning
- In office 28 October 2017 – 31 August 2020
- Deputy: Tang Yijun
- Preceded by: Li Xi
- Succeeded by: Zhang Guoqing

Governor of Liaoning
- In office 4 May 2015 – 30 October 2017
- Preceded by: Li Xi
- Succeeded by: Tang Yijun

Chairman of the Hunan Provincial Committee of the Chinese People's Political Consultative Conference
- In office February 2015 – January 2016
- Preceded by: Hu Biao
- Succeeded by: Li Weiwei

Director of the China National Space Administration
- In office 2010–2013
- Preceded by: Sun Laiyan
- Succeeded by: Ma Xingrui

Personal details
- Born: December 1954 (age 71) Chengbu County, Hunan, China
- Party: Chinese Communist Party
- Education: National University of Defense Technology

Chen Qiufa (Chinese: 陈求发; born December 1954) is a Chinese aerospace engineer and politician of Miao ethnic heritage. He is the Chinese Communist Party Committee Secretary and the former Governor of Liaoning province. He formerly served as Director of the China Atomic Energy Authority, Director of the China National Space Administration (CNSA), and Vice-Minister of Industry and Information Technology.

== Early life and education ==
Chen Qiufa was born in December 1954 in Chengdu County (now Chengbu Miao Autonomous County), Hunan Province. He is a member of the Miao minority. He began working in March 1973 as a teacher at Lianxing Elementary School in Chengbu, and joined the Chinese Communist Party (CCP) in September 1974.

In September 1975, Chen entered the electrical engineering department of National University of Defense Technology in Changsha, majoring in radar countermeasure. He graduated in October 1978.

== Career ==
After university Chen worked for the Ministry of Aerospace Industry from 1978 to 1994, first as an engineer, and later as a manager. From 1994 to 1998 he worked for China Aerospace Science and Technology Corporation. From 1998 to 2000 he was Director of the education department of the Commission for Science, Technology and Industry for National Defense (COSTIND). He was Head of Commission for Discipline Inspection at COSTIND from 2000 to 2005.

From 2005 to 2008 he was deputy director of COSTIND. When COSTIND was reorganized and merged into the Ministry of Industry and Information Technology (MIIT) in 2008, he became Director of the State Administration for Science, Technology and Industry for National Defence (SASTIND) under MIIT, as well as Vice-Minister of MIIT. He was also appointed Director of the China Atomic Energy Authority in 2008 and Director of the China National Space Administration in 2010.

In January 2013, he left all his positions with MIIT and was tapped to become Chairman of the Chinese People's Political Consultative Conference (PPCC) of his native Hunan Province, taking on a political office for the first time. He was also elected in November 2012 as a full member of the 18th Central Committee of the Chinese Communist Party.

On May 4, 2015, Chen Qiufa was appointed Acting Governor and Deputy Party Secretary of Liaoning, succeeding Li Xi, who was promoted to Party Secretary. Along with Ma Xingrui and Zhang Qingwei, Chen was one of a growing number of high regional officials in his generation who rose through the aerospace industry. Chen's appointment to Liaoning also demonstrated that being a provincial-level PPCC chief was no longer considered a "political retirement home" for older politicians, and that holders of this office could still be considered for further promotion. He was appointed as the CCP Committee Secretary of Liaoning in 2017. He was replaced by Zhang Guoqing in 2020.

On 17 October 2020, Chen was appointed the Deputy Chairperson of the National People's Congress Education, Science, Culture and Public Health Committee.

Political offices
Preceded by Li Xi	Governor of Liaoning; 2015–2017	Succeeded by Tang Yijun
Preceded by Hu Biao	Chairman of the Hunan Provincial Committee of the Chinese People's Political Consultative Conference; 2015–2016	Succeeded by Li Weiwei
Party political offices
Preceded by Li Xi	Party Secretary of Liaoning; 2017–2020	Succeeded by Zhang Guoqing
