= Wan Da =

Chinese politician

Wan Da (Chinese: 万达; October 1918 – August 7, 2002) was a People's Republic of China politician. He was born in Linzhou, Henan. He was People's Congress Chairman of Hunan.

Preceded by New office	People's Congress Chairman of Hunan	Succeeded by Sun Guozhi
