= Hunan Provincial Committee of the Chinese Communist Party =

Hunan Provincial Committee of the Chinese Communist Party 中国共产党湖南省委员会

Overview
- Type: Highest decision-making organ when Hunan Provincial Congress is not in session.
- Elected by: Hunan Provincial Congress
- Length of term: Five years
- Term limits: None
- First convocation: October 1921; 105 years ago
- Secretary: Wang Zhijun
- Deputy Secretary: Xie Weijiang; Jin Wei
- Secretary-General: Wang Junshou
- Executive organ: Standing Committee
- Inspection organ: Commission for Discipline Inspection

Meeting place
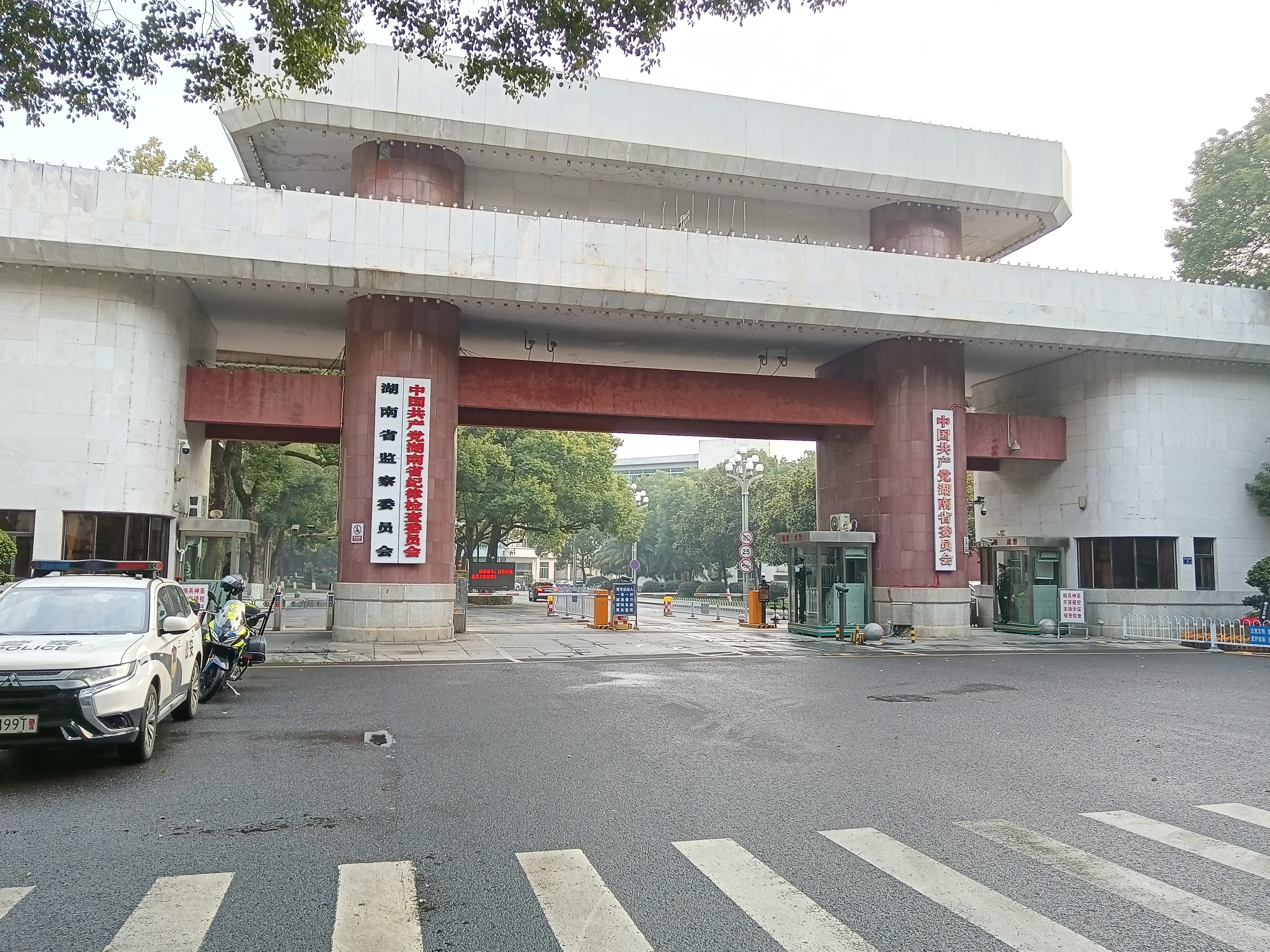
- Hunan Provincial Committee Building in Changsha

Website
- www.rednet.cn

Hunan Provincial Committee of the Chinese Communist Party
- Simplified Chinese: 中国共产党湖南省委员会
- Traditional Chinese: 中國共產黨湖南省委員會
Transcriptions
Standard Mandarin
- Hanyu Pinyin: Zhōngguó Gòngchǎndǎng Húnánshěng Wěiyuánhuì

Abbreviation
- Simplified Chinese: 中共湖南省委
- Traditional Chinese: 中共湖南省委
- Literal meaning: CCP Hunan Provincial Committee
Transcriptions
Standard Mandarin
- Hanyu Pinyin: Zhōnggòng Húnánshěng Wěi

The Hunan Provincial Committee of the Chinese Communist Party is the provincial committee of the Chinese Communist Party (CCP) in Hunan, China, and the province's top authority. The CCP committee secretary is the highest ranking post in the province.

== Organizations ==
The organization of the Hunan Provincial Committee includes:

- General Office

=== Functional Departments ===
- Organization Department
- Publicity Department
- United Front Work Department
- Political and Legal Affairs Commission
- Social Work Department
- Commission for Discipline Inspection
- Supervisory Commission

=== Offices ===
- Policy Research Office
- Office of the Cyberspace Affairs Commission
- Office of the Foreign Affairs Commission
- Office of the Deepening Reform Commission
- Office of the Institutional Organization Commission
- Office of the Military-civilian Fusion Development Committee
- Taiwan Work Office
- Office of the Leading Group for Inspection Work
- Bureau of Veteran Cadres

=== Dispatched institutions ===
- Working Committee of the Organs Directly Affiliated to the Hunan Provincial Committee
- Hunan Xiangjiang New Area Working Committee

=== Organizations directly under the Committee ===
- Hunan Party School
- Hunan Daily Newspaper Group
- Hunan Institute of Socialism
- Party History Research Office
- Hunan Provincial Archives
- Lecturer Group
- Shaoshan Management Bureau

=== Organization managed by the work organization ===
- Confidential Bureau

== Leadership ==
=== Heads of the Organization Department ===
Name (English)	Name (Chinese)	Tenure begins	Tenure ends	Ref.
Zhao Peiyi	赵培义	March 1990	January 1993	
Luo Haifan	罗海藩	February 1993	January 1997	
Qi Heping	戚和平	December 1996	June 2003	
Huang Jianguo	黄建国	June 2003	November 2011	
Guo Kailang	郭开朗	November 2011	October 2016	
Wang Shaofeng	王少峰	October 2016	December 2020	
Wang Cheng (politician)	王成	January 2021	March 2022	
Wang Yiguang	汪一光	July 2022		

=== Heads of the Publicity Department ===
Name (English)	Name (Chinese)	Tenure begins	Tenure ends	Ref.
Wen Xuande	文选德	January 1994	January 2002	
Huang Jianguo	黄建国	November 2001	June 2003	
Li Jiang	李江	June 2003	April 2004	
Jiang Jianguo	蒋建国	April 2004	October 2008	
Lu Jianping	路建平	November 2008	May 2012	
Xu Yousheng	许又声	June 2012	August 2015	
Zhang Wenxiong	张文雄	August 2015	October 2016	
Cai Zhenhong	蔡振红	November 2016	May 2019	
Zhang Hongsen	张宏森	September 2019	June 2021	
Zeng Wanming	曾万明	August 2021	September 2021	
yang Haodong	杨浩东	November 2021	April 2025	
Liu Hongbing	刘红兵	30 April 2025		

=== Secretaries of the Political and Legal Affairs Commission ===
Name (English)	Name (Chinese)	Tenure begins	Tenure ends	Ref.
Li Yiheng	李贻衡	1996	2000	
Zhou Benshun	周本顺	November 2000	November 2003	
Li Jiang	李江	April 2004	December 2011	
Sun Jianguo	孙建国	December 2011	August 2015	
Li Weiwei	李微微	August 2015	June 2016	
Huang Guanchun	黄关春	June 2016	May 2019	
Li Dianxun	李殿勋	May 2019	December 2021	
Wei Jianfeng	魏建锋	December 2021		

=== Heads of the United Front Work Department ===
Name (English)	Name (Chinese)	Tenure begins	Tenure ends	Ref.
Long Yuxian	龙禹贤	1991	1995	
Shi Yuzhen	石玉珍	April 1995	November 2006	
Li Weiwei	李微微	November 2006	August 2015	
Huang Lanxiang	黄兰香	August 2015	November 2021	
Sui Zhongcheng	隋忠诚	November 2021		
