= Liu Fusheng =

Chinese politician (1931–2021)

- 刘夫生

Chairman of the Hunan Provincial Committee of the Chinese People's Political Consultative Conference
- In office January 1998 – January 2001
- Preceded by: Liu Zheng
- Succeeded by: Wang Keying

Chairman of the Hunan People's Congress
- In office January 1988 – January 1998
- Preceded by: Jiao Linyi
- Succeeded by: Wang Maolin

First Communist Party Secretary of Changsha
- In office March 1982 – February 1983
- Preceded by: Shi Xinshan
- Succeeded by: Zou Naishan

Personal details
- Born: October 1931 Dingxiang County, Shanxi, China
- Died: February 19, 2021 (aged 89) Changsha, Hunan, China
- Party: Chinese Communist Party

Chinese name
- Traditional Chinese: 劉夫生
- Simplified Chinese: 刘夫生
Transcriptions
Standard Mandarin
- Hanyu Pinyin: Liú Fūshēng

Liu Fusheng (Chinese: 刘夫生; October 1931 – 19 February 2021) was a Chinese politician. He was born in Dingxiang County, Shanxi. He joined the Chinese Communist Party in 1947. He was People's Congress Chairman and CPPCC Chairman of Hunan.

== Career ==
Liu was born in Dingxiang County, Shanxi, in October 1931. He entered the workforce in 1945, and joined the Chinese Communist Party in 1947. After the establishment of the Communist State, he worked in central China's Hunan province. In March 1982, he was appointed First Communist Party Secretary of Changsha, a position he held until February 1983. He rose to become chairman of the Hunan People's Congress in 1998, a position he held for ten years. In January 1998, he became chairman of the Hunan Provincial Committee of the Chinese People's Political Consultative Conference, and served until January 2001.

He was a delegate to the 12th and 13th National Congress of the Chinese Communist Party. He was a delegate to 4th, 7th and 8th National People's Congress. He was a member of the 9th National Committee of the Chinese People's Political Consultative Conference.

Party political offices
Preceded by Shi Xinshan	First Communist Party Secretary of Changsha; 1982–1983	Succeeded by Zou Naishan
Assembly seats
Preceded by Jiao Linyi	Chairman of the Hunan People's Congress; 1988–1998	Succeeded by Wang Maolin
Preceded by Liu Zheng	Chairman of the Hunan Provincial Committee of the Chinese People's Political Consultative Conference; 1998–2001	Succeeded by Wang Keying
