= Huang Lanxiang =

Chinese politician

- 黄兰香

Vice Governor of the Hunan
- Incumbent
- Assumed office January 2013

Communist Party Secretary of Yueyang
- In office December 2011 – January 2013
- Preceded by: Yi Lianhong
- Succeeded by: Qing Jianwei

Mayor of Yueyang
- In office September 2006 – December 2011
- Preceded by: Luo Bisheng
- Succeeded by: Sheng Ronghua

Personal details
- Born: February 1962 (age 64) Liling, Hunan, China
- Party: Chinese Communist Party
- Education: Central Party School of the Chinese Communist Party; Peking University; Chinese Academy of Social Sciences

Chinese name
- Traditional Chinese: 黃蘭香
- Simplified Chinese: 黄兰香
Transcriptions
Standard Mandarin
- Hanyu Pinyin: Huáng Lánxiāng

Huang Lanxiang (Chinese: 黄兰香; pinyin: Huáng Lánxiāng; born February 1962) is a Chinese politician who since 2015 has served as a vice governor of Hunan.

== Biography ==
Huang was born in 1962, in Liling, Hunan. After having studied mathematics at Hunan Normal University she joined the Chinese Communist Party (CCP) and graduated with a master's degree in public administration from the Central Party School of the Chinese Communist Party. In 1991 she was assigned as the secretary of the Zhuzhou Youth League committee and later served in the same role for the CCP in the North district and Shifeng district's of Zhuzhou. A few years later in 1996, Huang enrolled at the Chinese Academy of Social Sciences where she majored in International Trade before being appointed the vice chairman of the Hunan Women's Federation CCP Committee, the secretary of CCP Shifeng District Committee of Zhuzhou and director of the standing committee of People's Congress of Shifeng District.

In 2013 Huang was promoted to the position of vice governor of the Hunan Provincial People's Government where in her role she worked in the division of labor department. Two years later she joined her most senior role yet with the Hunan Provincial Committee of the Chinese Communist Party.

Government offices
Previous: Luo Bisheng (罗碧升)	Mayor of Yueyang; 2006-2011	Next: Sheng Ronghua (盛荣华)
Party political offices
Previous: Yi Lianhong	Communist Party Secretary of Yueyang; 2011-2013	Next: Qing Jianwei (卿渐伟)
