= Yang Zhengwu =

Chinese politician

Yang Zhengwu (Chinese: 杨正午; born January 1941) is an ethnic Tujia Chinese politician. He was born in Longshan County, Xiangxi Tujia and Miao Autonomous Prefecture, Hunan. He was Chinese Communist Party committee secretary of his home county (1978–1981), his home prefecture (1983–1990) and his home province (1998–2005). He was governor (1995–1998) and People's Congress Chairman (1999–2006) of his home province.

Preceded by Chen Bangzhu	Governor of Hunan; 1995–1998	Succeeded by Chu Bo
Preceded by Wang Maolin	Communist Party Secretary of Hunan; 1998–2005	Succeeded by Zhang Chunxian
Preceded by Wang Maolin	People's Congress Chairman of Hunan; 1999–2006	Succeeded by Zhang Chunxian
