= Wang Maolin =

Chinese politician

Party Secretary of Shanxi
- In office 1991–1993
- Preceded by: Li Ligong
- Succeeded by: Hu Fuguo

Party Secretary of Hunan
- In office September 1993 – October 1998
- Preceded by: Xiong Qingquan
- Succeeded by: Yang Zhengwu

Personal details
- Born: December 1934 (age 91) Qidong, Jiangsu
- Party: Chinese Communist Party

Wang Maolin (Chinese: 王茂林; born December 1934) is a Chinese politician. He was born in Qidong, Jiangsu. He joined the Chinese Communist Party in 1956. He was mayor (1982–1985) and Party Secretary (1985–1987) of Taiyuan. He was Party Secretary (1991–1993) and CPPCC Committee Chairman (1993) of Shanxi. He was Party Secretary (1993–1999) and People's Congress Chairman (1998) of Hunan.

Wang was the inaugural head of the 610 Office, in charge of suppressing Falun Gong.

Preceded by	Mayor of Taiyuan; 1982–1985	Succeeded by Yang Chongchun
Preceded by Wang Jiangong	Party Secretary of Taiyuan; 1985–1987	Succeeded by Sun Ying
Preceded by Li Ligong	Party Secretary of Shanxi; 1991–1993	Succeeded by Hu Fuguo
Preceded by Li Xiuren	CPPCC Committee Chairman of Shanxi; 1993	Succeeded by Hu Fuguo
Preceded by Xiong Qingquan	Party Secretary of Hunan; 1993–1999	Succeeded by Yang Zhengwu
Preceded by Liu Fusheng	Chairman of the Hunan People's Congress; 1998	Succeeded by Yang Zhenwu
