= Wang Keying =

Chinese politician

Wang Keying (Chinese: 王克英) (born December 1937) is a People's Republic of China politician. He was born in Linxiang, Hunan. He graduated from the Huazhong University of Science and Technology.

Wang was the Mayor of Changsha from 1985 to 1990 and CPPCC Committee Chairman of Hunan from 2001 to 2003.

Preceded by	Mayor of Changsha; 1985–1990	Succeeded by
Preceded by Liu Fusheng	CPPCC Committee Chairman of Hunan; 2001–2003	Succeeded by Hu Biao
