= Liu Zheng (politician) =

Chinese politician of the People's Republic of China

Liu Zheng (Chinese: 刘正) (January 1929 – June 6, 2006) was a People's Republic of China politician. He was born in Changsha, Hunan. He was a delegate to the 5th National People's Congress and 6th National People's Congress.

Preceded by Sun Guozhi	Governor of Hunan; 1983–1985	Succeeded by Xiong Qingquan
Preceded by Cheng Xingling	CPPCC Committee Chairman of Hunan; 1988–1998	Succeeded by Liu Fusheng
