= Concerns over Chinese involvement in 5G wireless networks =

Concerns over Chinese involvement in 5G wireless networks stem from allegations that cellular network equipment sourced from vendors from the People's Republic of China may contain backdoors enabling surveillance by the Chinese government (as part of its intelligence activity internationally) and Chinese laws, such as the Cybersecurity Law of the People's Republic of China, which compel companies and individuals to assist the state intelligence agency on the collection of information whenever requested. The allegations came against the backdrop of the rising prominence of Chinese telecommunication vendors Huawei and ZTE in the 5G equipment market, and the controversy has led to other countries debating whether Chinese vendors should be allowed to participate in 5G deployments.

All members of the Five Eyes international intelligence alliance—Australia, Canada, New Zealand, the United Kingdom, and the United States—have declared that the use of Huawei telecommunications equipment, particularly in 5G networks, poses "significant security risks". The United States, Australia, and Vietnam have banned Chinese companies from providing its 5G equipment due to security concerns. The United Kingdom is also expected to implement a complete ban following resistance from MPs.

These concerns led to The Clean Network, a US government-led, bi-partisan effort to address what it describes as "the long-term threat to data privacy, security, human rights, and principled collaboration posed to the free world from authoritarian malign actors." It has resulted in an "alliance of democracies and companies," "based on democratic values." According to the United States, The Clean Network is intended to implement internationally accepted digital trust standards across a coalition of trusted partners.

According to Hudson Institute senior fellow Arthur L. Herman and former US security advisor Robert C. O'Brien, writing in The Hill, in December 2021, only 8 countries have been willing to ban Huawei's 5G equipment, but more than 90 countries have signed up with Huawei, including some NATO members.

== Background ==
5G succeeds 4G LTE wireless technology. Developments have been focused on enabling low-latency communications, and promises of a minimum peak network speed of 20 gigabits per/second (20 times faster than the equivalent on 4G LTE networks), and uses within Internet of things and smart city technology.

The initial development of 2G, 3G, and 4G technologies were centred upon Japan, Europe, and the United States, respectively. China's five-year plan for 2016–2020 and the Made in China 2025 initiative both identified 5G as a "strategic emerging industry", with goals for Chinese companies to become more competitive and innovative in the global market, and avert the country's prior reputation for low-quality and counterfeit goods. All wireless carriers in China are state-owned, which has helped the government to expedite the development of 5G networks, and access to the wireless spectrum. It has been argued that early access to 5G would give China an advantage in developing services that can leverage the technology. Domestic vendors such as Huawei and ZTE have subsequently leveraged China's position to market 5G-compatible equipment for international deployments; Huawei had seen significant growth in the 2010s, aided by its ability to undercut competitors, a large number of international partnerships, the increasing success of its smartphone business, the amount it has invested in R&D, competitive deployment support, and investments by the China Development Bank. As of 2019, the only other major manufacturers of 5G equipment are the European rivals of Ericsson and Nokia: they, along with Huawei and ZTE, account for two-thirds of the overall market. According to Bloomberg, Huawei's 5G equipment tends to be less expensive than the alternatives provided from Nokia and Ericsson AB, and is "often of higher quality" due to having put more investments in research and development. And despite the allegations, Huawei has still managed to win 5G contracts in Russia, the Middle East, Africa, and Asia, including the Philippines and Thailand.

Huawei has faced various allegations of intellectual property theft and corporate espionage, including copying proprietary source code from Cisco Systems equipment, and an employee stealing a robotic arm for smartphone stress testing from a T-Mobile US laboratory. In January 2019, US authorities indicted Huawei and its vice-chairwoman and CFO Meng Wanzhou on charges of theft of trade secrets (including allegations that Huawei's Chinese division had a program to issue bonuses for employees who successfully obtain confidential information from competitors. In regards to the aforementioned T-Mobile robotic arm, Huawei's US division disavowed the employee's actions and this program, as it is not in line with local business practices), and having used a shell company to mask investments in Iran that violated US sanctions (including resale of technology of US origin); in October 2011, The Wall Street Journal reported that Huawei was the largest provider of telecommunications equipment in Iran.

In 2012, it was reported by The Wall Street Journal that Canadian telecom equipment firm Nortel Networks had been the subject of an intrusion by Chinese hackers from 2000 through its bankruptcy in 2009, who had accessed internal documents and other proprietary information. The company's former security adviser Brian Shields alleged that the intrusion was a state-sponsored attack that may have benefited domestic competitors such as Huawei and ZTE, and acknowledged that there was circumstantial evidence that connected the company's downfall to the beginning of Huawei's international growth. He warned against cooperation with Chinese vendors, arguing that "they've got this Communist Party over there right in their corporate offices. What are these people doing? Why is it such a close relationship with the Chinese government?"

Allegations surrounding Chinese surveillance via network infrastructure cite the 2017 National Intelligence Law, and the 2014 Counter-Espionage Law. The National Intelligence Law gives intelligence agencies the ability to compel citizens and organizations to cooperate in investigations, and that China will protect any organization or individual that helps the Chinese government. The 2014 Counter-Espionage law states that "when the state security organ investigates and understands the situation of espionage and collects relevant evidence, the relevant organizations and individuals shall provide it truthfully and may not refuse." Softbank CTO Miyagawa Jyunichi explained that unlike a 4G core network (where data is encrypted and transmitted using a tunneling protocol that makes it difficult to extract communication data from the network), if technology like mobile edge computing is used, processing servers could be placed near 5G base stations, to enable information processing on the base station side of the carrier network. This makes it possible to extract user data via these servers, which theoretically allows for surveillance.

The United States government claims that the Chinese government can force wireless infrastructure vendors to incorporate software backdoors or hardware that would allow China to spy on the US or its allies.

US security concerns surrounding Huawei have pre-dated the current 5G-related controversies; in 2007, Bain Capital attempted to acquire network equipment vendor 3Com with minority financing from Huawei. However, the transaction faced scrutiny from the Committee on Foreign Investment in the United States, which deemed it a threat to national security due to Huawei founder Ren Zhengfei having been a former engineer for the People's Liberation Army, and concerns that China could gain access to intrusion detection technology that 3Com had developed for the US government and armed forces. When Huawei bought out its joint venture with Symantec in 2012, The New York Times reported that Symantec had fears that the partnership "would prevent it from obtaining United States government classified information about cyberthreats".

It has been argued that Huawei has ties to the Chinese government: the CIA has cited anonymous British sources claiming that entities such as the National Security Commission of the Chinese Communist Party and the People's Liberation Army have provided funding to Huawei. US senator Marco Rubio referred to Huawei and ZTE as being "state-directed", and warned that the US had to be "vigilant" in preventing them from "undermining and endangering America's 5G networks". He also stated that Huawei "undermine[s] foreign competition by stealing trade secrets and intellectual property, and through artificially low prices backed by the Chinese government." During testimony to the Senate Intelligence Committee in 2018, US intelligence chiefs warned against the company, with FBI director Christopher A. Wray stating that they were "concerned about the risks of allowing any company or entity that is beholden to foreign governments that don't share our values to gain positions of power inside our telecommunications networks."

Fellow senator Mark Warner argued that "no major Chinese company is independent of the Chinese government and Communist Party", and warned that the Chinese government can exploit consumer electronics products from these companies, such as smartphones. He claimed that "software reviews of existing Huawei products are not sufficient to preclude the possibility of a vendor pushing a malicious update that enables surveillance in the future. Any supposedly safe Chinese product is one firmware update away from being an insecure Chinese product." Robert Strayer, US State Department ambassador for cyber and international communications, stated at MWC Barcelona in 2019 that they were "asking other governments and the private sector to consider the threat posed by Huawei and other Chinese information technology companies." The country has threatened to withdraw some co-operations with its allies if they install Huawei equipment on telecommunication networks.

China contends that United States efforts to block its 5G cooperation with other countries violates principles of fair competition.

== Australia ==
Australia banned Chinese vendors from providing equipment for 5G networks, citing the aforementioned intelligence laws as a factor. Other countries like Japan have cited security concerns and have successfully persuaded carriers to exclude Huawei or ZTE equipment in their 5G networks.

== Belgium ==
Belgium is the seat of the European Commission, other EU institutions, the NATO headquarters, SHAPE, and other high-ranking institutions. On 9 October 2020, Orange S.A. and its competitor Proximus (ex Belgacom) have declared that Nokia and Ericsson were going to deliver 5G equipment.

== Brazil ==
In November 2020, Brazil backed America's "Clean Network" initiative. In November 2021, as Brazil held its tender for 5G wireless networks, Perpétua Almeida, a federal lawmaker who led the commission for the 5G tender for the lower house of Brazilian Congress, said that banning Huawei never made sense and that Brazil had to maintain an independent position amidst the US-China dispute over the company.

== Canada ==
Rogers cooperated with Ericsson to build their 5G network. Bell Canada has worked with both Ericsson and Nokia. Telus is working with Ericsson, Nokia, and Samsung. SaskTel is working with Samsung.

In a May 2023 policy statement, Canada's Minister of Innovation, Science and Industry expressed serious concerns about companies such as Huawei and ZTE, as they could be compelled to comply with extrajudicial directions from foreign governments, which would conflict with Canadian laws or be detrimental to Canadian interests.

== Netherlands ==
In April 2019, Dutch telecom KPN said that it would select a Western supplier to build its core 5G mobile network, making it one of the first European operators to eliminate Huawei. On 15 October 2020, KPN said in a statement that it will "collaborate with Ericsson" for the implementation of its core 5G technology. The US government had expressed fears that if KPN's 5G backbone contained Huawei equipment it would be vulnerable to spying by the Chinese state.

In March 2021, Reuters reported that Amsterdam-based telecom and pay TV company United Group is considering removal of Huawei equipment from its networks. United Group's operations are primarily in Bulgaria, Croatia, Slovenia, Greece, and Serbia. United Group's CEO said that "switching to something that is more US-approved is the right approach" although he is concerned about the costs associated with doing so.

== France ==
In January 2020, the head of France's cybersecurity agency ANSSI said his agency had not uncovered any evidence of Huawei spying through its equipment in Europe. In June 2020, ANSSI informed French telecommunications companies that they would not be allowed to renew licenses for 5G equipment made from Huawei after 2028.

== Germany ==
In March 2019, Germany's Federal Network Agency announced that all wireless networks, including 5G and all other standards, will be subject to heightened security requirements. This includes mandatory security testing by the Federal Office for Information Security before equipment is deployed, and operators being required to report any abnormalities. Operators are also being encouraged to source equipment from multiple vendors.

In September 2023, Germany's Interior Ministry proposed to ban critical components from Huawei and ZTE from its 5G mobile network by 2026 through a staggered approach to limit disruption.

== Japan ==
In May 2019, Japan announced that effective 1 August 2019, the telecom, integrated circuitry, and mobile phone manufacturing industries would be added to laws allowing the government to block foreign investments within sensitive sectors for security reasons. The government stated that these regulations were due to "the increased importance of securing cyber security in recent years", but did not name any specific companies or countries. The announcement followed trade talks the same day between Trump and prime minister Shinzō Abe.

== New Zealand ==
In late November 2018, the New Zealand signals intelligence agency Government Communications Security Bureau (GCSB) blocked telecommunications company Spark from using Huawei equipment in its planned 5G upgrade, claiming that it posed a "significant network security risk." The NZ ban followed a similar ban in Australia in August 2018.

In mid July 2020, GCSB Minister Andrew Little confirmed that New Zealand would not join the United Kingdom and United States in excluding Huawei from the country's 5G networks on national security grounds. Telecommunications Users Association chief executive Craig Young welcomed the Government's announcement, saying that a ban would force companies with Huawei equipment to replace expensive equipment due to the integrated nature of the country's 2G, 3G, and 4G networks. In response to the Government's announcement, Huawei NZ's deputy managing director Andrew Bowater emphasized the company's commitment to helping customers deal with the effects of the COVID-19 pandemic in New Zealand.

== The Philippines ==
On 21 May 2019, as the result of an inquiry performed in cooperation with other foreign law enforcement agencies, the Philippine National Police concluded that there was no evidence that Huawei had been involved in espionage. In January 2023, Philippines operator Now Telecom selected Nokia for a 5G Standalone network. In September 2023, Nokia announced its deployment of the modular Interleaved Passive Active Antenna (IPAA+) for Globe Telecom in the southern islands of the Philippines.

== Poland ==
On 11 January 2019, Poland announced that two people working on a 5G Huawei network had been arrested: Wang Weijing (a Huawei executive), and Piotr Durbaglo, a consultant having worked for Polish domestic security, but currently working for Orange on 5G network testing. In early pilot projects, Huawei technology was predominantly used, but in subsequent initiatives, operators have shifted their attention to Ericsson and Nokia.

== Portugal ==
In May 2023 Portugal decided to close its doors to companies from 'high risk' countries and jurisdictions with respect to its fifth generation telephone network. These include equipment from suppliers based outside the European Union, as well as from non-member states of the North Atlantic Treaty Organization (NATO) or the Organization for Economic Cooperation and Development (OECD). The measure is intended to safeguard national networks from potential security risks. With this move, it has effectively blocked Chinese tech giant Huawei Technologies Co. from its market. The security assessment committee of the government's Higher Council for Cyberspace Security highlighted that companies from outside these specific jurisdictions pose a significant risk to the security of national networks.

This decision also excludes Indian, Russian, African or Latin American companies.

== Romania ==
In November 2020, Romania's prime minister Ludovic Orban stated that Huawei "does not meet [security] conditions" to be part of building 5G networks in the country. The remarks come after Romanian Prime Minister Ludovic Orban said Huawei "does not meet conditions" to be part of 5G networks in the country. "With respect to 5G, [China] cannot be our partner," Orban told media in an interview published on 1 November.

Despite this, in 2023, Romania authorised Lenovo, a Hong Kong-domiciled company, to participate in the country's 5G network.

In February 2021, the Government of Romania approved a memorandum to limit the companies from non-EU countries that have no trade agreements with Romania or the European Union from participating in public tenders. In March 2021, prime minister Florin Cîțu announced that Romania's Government will evaluate an ordinance that will exclude companies from non-EU countries that do not have trade agreements with the European Union, including China, from participating in infrastructure projects in Romania.

== Singapore ==
In 2020, Singapore's leading mobile operators decided against using Huawei as the main equipment supplier to develop national 5G networks, with contracts awarded to Ericsson and Nokia instead.

== Slovakia ==
In October 2020, Slovakia signed up to join the Clean Network initiative.

== South Korea ==
In South Korea, LG Uplus is the only carrier to have adopted Huawei equipment for its 5G equipment due to its favourable pricing, unlike the other two carriers that have rejected Huawei for security reasons. LG Uplus does not believe that there are problems in the security of Huawei equipment, which has resulted in boycott movements against the carrier for their perceived negligence in security by choosing Huawei as its supplier. In light of the differences in the decisions by the carriers to use Huawei, Second Vice Foreign Minister Lee Tae-ho said that the decision was one for the companies and not the government to decide

Experts and politicians have speculated that the South Korean government is not willing to ban Huawei equipment, fearing a repeat of the Chinese retaliation that resulted from the deployment of THAAD which reportedly cost South Korea $5.1 billion in lost revenues.

== Sweden ==
In Sweden, the Post and Telecom Authority (PTS) decided in October 2020 that Huawei and ZTE were not allowed to deliver parts for the 5G net in Sweden. In case that parts of them have already been installed, they have to be removed until January 2025. PTS was advised by the Swedish military and security services that China was "one of the biggest threats against Sweden."

In June 2021, a Swedish court upheld the ban on Huawei from selling its products in Sweden.

== Taiwan ==
Taiwan has issued guidelines banning the use of mainland Chinese telecommunications equipment for all its government departments, organizations, and government-controlled companies.

== Turkey ==
Turkey has so far allowed its telecoms to sign up with Huawei. In March 2022, the Turkish embassy in China posted on Weibo, that Türk Telekom had signed a MOA with Huawei to develop the Turkish 5G network. Turkey's Deputy Minister of Transport and Infrastructure, Ömer Fatih Sayan, was present at the signing ceremony in Barcelona and said, "Over the past 20 years, Huawei has made important contributions to Turkey’s infrastructure construction. We hope these contributions will continue in domestic and local production".

In May 2022, Turkcell and Ericsson announced the first 5G autonomous mobile robot demonstration in Turkey. According to Ericsson, the demonstration showcased 5G's ability to enable real-time, low-latency data transfer, which can improve safety in industrial operations.

== United Kingdom ==
In October 2018, BT Group announced that it had been phasing out Huawei equipment from "core" components of its wireless infrastructure (excluding parts such as phone mast antennas), including its 5G services, and the Emergency Services Network project.

In December 2018, Gavin Williamson, the UK's Defence Secretary, expressed "grave" and "very deep concerns" about the company providing technology to upgrade Britain's services to 5G. He accused Beijing of acting "sometimes in a malign way". Alex Younger, the head of MI6, also raised questions about Huawei's role.

In 2019, the UK National Cyber Security Centre concluded that the risk from using Huawei equipment for their 5G infrastructure, was manageable. Former head of GCHQ, Robert Hannigan in that year, wrote in an op-ed in the Financial Times that the NCSC had "never found evidence of malicious Chinese state cyber activity through Huawei" and "assertions that any Chinese technology in any part of a 5G network represents an unacceptable risk are nonsense" while advocating that "the UK and other European countries should hold their nerve and base decisions on Chinese involvement in future telecoms on technical expertise and rational assessment of risk, rather than political fashion or trade wars".

In May 2019, the US sent a delegation to the UK and tried to convince the British government to not use Huawei for their 5G rollout. Lord Darroch, who previously was Britain's national security advisor and later the UK's ambassador in the US after 2016, said that the US delegation had failed to give any "compelling technical arguments" that undermined the GCHQ's conclusion. Darroch said that the encounter with the US delegation, exposed that the US case was "really political, not technical". However Trump later introduced further sanctions in May 2020 in which Huawei was no longer allowed to use US-made chips. As a result of that, Ciaran Martin's team at GCHQ was no longer able to guarantee the security of Huawei's products and 2 months later, then prime minister Boris Johnson finally banned Huawei in Britain. Such a move would delay the nation's 5G rollout by up to three years, and is estimated to cost at least £2 billion to reach full removal of all Huawei 5G equipment from its network by 2027.

The UK is expected to ban Huawei and remove it from its network by 2023 having initially attempted to ban it from core networks and limit its involvement in its non-core network to 35%. The review was announced following concern from MPs, intelligence officials, and allies. Liu Xiaoming, Chinese ambassador to the UK, called the persecution of Huawei a kind of "a witch-hunt" and assured that as a private-owned company, the brand has nothing to do with the Chinese authorities. Several Conservative Party members, on their part, have warned against using Huawei.

The costs involved in removing Huawei technology from the UK networks are likely to be significant as the company accounts for about three quarters of the radio access across Britain's 4G network infrastructure. At the same time, a significant portion of the initial stages of the 5G network come from Huawei.

In April 2020, the China Research Group was founded by Conservative MPs; as part of its remit, the group aims to look into "how the development, ownership, and regulation of platform technologies that underpin future economic growth and innovation are being influenced" by China.

On 7 October 2020, the Defence Select Committee released a report claiming that there was clear evidence of collusion between Huawei, the Chinese state, and the Chinese Communist Party. The committee said that the government should now consider assessing equipment from other vendors in a similar fashion.

== United States ==
A 2012 White House-ordered security review found no evidence that Huawei spied for China and said instead that security vulnerabilities on its products posed a greater threat to its users. The details of the leaked review came a week after a US House Intelligence Committee report which warned against letting Huawei supply critical telecommunications infrastructure in the United States.

The United States has engaged in several domestic actions designed to hinder Chinese telecom providers from doing business in the country. The National Defense Authorization Act for Fiscal Year 2019 barred the US federal government from obtaining equipment from several Chinese vendors, including Huawei and ZTE.

On 15 May 2019, president Donald Trump signed executive order 13873 to declare a national emergency under the International Emergency Economic Powers Act, allowing for restrictions to be imposed on commerce with "foreign adversaries" that involve information and communications technology. Trump stated that the US needed to protect itself against "foreign adversaries" that create and exploit security vulnerabilities in information and communications systems: the order made no specific references to any country or vendor. The same day, the US Department of Commerce also added Huawei and various affiliates to its Entity List under the Export Administration Regulations (restricting its ability to perform commerce with US companies), citing that it had been indicted for "knowingly and willfully causing the export, reexport, sale, and supply, directly and indirectly, of goods, technology, and services (banking and other financial services) from the United States to Iran and the government of Iran without obtaining a license from the Department of Treasury's Office of Foreign Assets Control (OFAC)". Some US media reports suggested that the timing of the latter was not coincidental.

In February 2020, the Wall Street Journal reported that US officials claimed Huawei has had the ability to covertly exploit backdoors intended for law enforcement officials since 2009. These backdoors are found on carrier equipment like antennas and routers.

== Vietnam ==
In July 2019, It was reported that Vietnamese telecom companies were looking to avoid Huawei equipment for their 5G networks. In May 2020, Viettel, the largest Vietnamese telecom company, and Qualcomm announced collaboration on 5G infrastructure development and Viettel selected Qualcomm 5G RAN platforms for its next-generation 5G mobile infrastructure.

== Responses ==
As China places importance on worldwide 5G dominance, observers have noted that the Chinese government has granted Huawei and ZTE much more comprehensive support than other domestic companies facing troubles abroad, such as ByteDance, since Huawei is considered a national champion in China's "techno-nationalist development strategies" for national security and commercial enterprises. For instance, after Huawei CFO Meng Wanzhou was detained in Canada pending extradition to the United States for fraud charges, China immediately arrested Michael Kovrig and Michael Spavor in what was widely viewed as "hostage diplomacy". China has also imposed tariffs on Australian imports in 2020, in apparent retaliation for Huawei and ZTE being excluded from Australia's 5G network in 2018.

Huawei founder Ren Zhengfei has described the claims of Huawei committing espionage as politically motivated as the US wanted to remain the global leader in technology and also argued that the West could face a "second Cold War" if it did not accept new entrants such as China. Ren has also stated that Huawei had never given data to the Chinese government, would not allow the Chinese government access to data (noting that his membership in the Chinese Communist Party would not affect this ability), nor would it assist in espionage against the United States, even if required by law. However, Wired reported that "US experts on Chinese law and tech policy say the country’s government doesn’t limit itself to what the law explicitly allows". A 2019 article by Sinopsis.cz, a project by NED-supported AcaMedia z.ú., claimed that Article 7 of the 2017 PRC national intelligence-gathering activities law had "codified" a duty to spy for the CCP despite assurances from Huawei.

In a speech at the Mobile World Congress 2019, Huawei's rotating chairman Guo Ping similarly addressed the allegations, stating that innovation "is nothing without security", and pledged that Huawei had never placed backdoors in its equipment, would never place backdoors, and would not allow other parties to do so. Ping also called out the US government for engaging in surveillance activities of its own, including PRISM, and the National Security Agency having hacked Huawei in the past, arguing that "if the NSA wants to modify routers or switches to eavesdrop, a Chinese company will be unlikely to co-operate". In a Financial Times editorial, Ping stated that Huawei "hampers US efforts to spy on whomever it wants," and stated again that it "has not and will never plant backdoors."

On 14 May 2019, chairman Liang Hua stated at a conference in London that Huawei was willing to accept a "no spy" pact with the British government to ease concerns over its involvement in local 5G deployments. The National Security Council had made a decision to only allow Huawei to provide "non-core" components due to the security concerns.

Houlin Zhao, secretary-general of the International Telecommunication Union, has also suggested that the US allegations are politically motivated.

In a statement published by Chinese Communist Party-owned tabloid Global Times in response to Trump's May 2019 executive order, Huawei stated that the move would "only force the US to use inferior and expensive alternative equipment, lagging behind other countries", and that they were willing to "communicate with the US to ensure product security".

In September 2019, Ren told The Economist and The New York Times that Huawei was open to the possibility of selling a blanket license for its 5G intellectual property to a US company. He saw it as an effort to spur domestic competition, and quell fears over espionage allegations by allowing the licensee to analyze and iterate upon the technology as they see fit.

In an op-ed for the South China Morning Post, Chandran Nair, founder of the Hong Kong-based think-tank, The Global Institute for Tomorrow, described the dispute as being "a sequel of the Yellow Peril", and compared it to examples of US anti-Japanese sentiment in the 1980s. Nair has in other op-eds questioned the legitimacy of Meng's arrest and supported China's model of development.

An opinion piece published in Wired Magazine written by the Vice President of the Law institute at the state-backed Chinese Academy of Social Sciences concluded that the Chinese government could not force Huawei to make backdoors and cited two reviews which were both commissioned by Huawei of the two aforementioned intelligence laws by attorneys from Zhong Lun and Clifford Chance which also concluded that there was no law requiring companies to place backdoors in their hardware. The opinion was criticized by three current and former American law professors.

== See also ==
- Advanced Persistent Threat
- China–United States trade war
- Crypto AG (US CIA owned encryption company selling to governments around the world)
- Chinese intelligence activity abroad
- Chinese cyberwarfare
- Chinese espionage in the United States
- Criticism of Huawei (Espionage and security concerns)
- Cyber-warfare
- Economic security
- GhostNet
- Honker Union
- Economic and Industrial Espionage
- Internet censorship in China
- Operation Aurora
- RedHack (from Turkey)
- Shadow Network
- Titan Rain
