= Chen Bangzhu =

Chinese politician (1934–2026)

- 陈邦柱

Chairperson of the Population, Resources and Environment Committee of the Chinese People's Political Consultative Conference
- In office June 2000 – March 2008
- Preceded by: Hou Jie
- Succeeded by: Zhang Weiqing

Minister of Internal Trade
- In office February 1995 – March 1998
- Preceded by: Zhang Haoruo
- Succeeded by: Position revoked

Governor of Hunan
- In office May 1989 – August 1994
- Preceded by: Xiong Qingquan
- Succeeded by: Yang Zhengwu

Personal details
- Born: September 1934 Jiujiang, Jiangxi, China
- Died: February 8, 2026 (aged 91)
- Party: Chinese Communist Party
- Education: Chongqing Jianzhu University

Chinese name
- Simplified Chinese: 陈邦柱
- Traditional Chinese: 陳邦柱
Transcriptions
Standard Mandarin
- Hanyu Pinyin: Chén Bāngzhù

Chen Bangzhu (Chinese: 陈邦柱; September 1934 – 8 February 2026) was a Chinese politician who served as minister of Internal Trade from 1995 to 1998 and governor of Hunan from 1989 to 1994.

== Life and career ==
Chen was born in Jiujiang, Jiangxi, in September 1934, during the Republic of China. In 1954, he graduated from Chongqing Jianzhu University (now Chongqing University). He joined the Chinese Communist Party in October 1975. In his early years, he worked in northeast China's Jilin province. He worked in the Ministry of Chemical Industry before serving as mayor of Yueyang in August 1983. He was appointed vice governor of Hunan in 1984 and promoted to member of the standing committee of the CPC Hunan Provincial Committee, the province's top authority. He also served as director of Hunan Foreign Economic and Trade Commission between August 1984 and January 1985. In 1987, he became an alternate member of the 13th Central Committee of the Chinese Communist Party. In May 1989, he was prompted to become governor of Hunan, succeeding Xiong Qingquan. In 1992, he became a member of the 14th Central Committee of the Chinese Communist Party.

In February 1995, Chen was transferred to Beijing and appointed minister of Internal Trade. In 1997, he became a member of the 15th Central Committee of the Chinese Communist Party. In March 1998, he was appointed deputy director of the State Economic and Trade Commission. In March 2000, he became a member of the 9th Standing Committee of the Chinese People's Political Consultative Conference. In May 1998, he took office as a member of the Preparatory Committee of the Macao Special Administrative Region. In June 2000, he was made chairperson of the Population, Resources and Environment Committee of the Chinese People's Political Consultative Conference, serving in the post until his retirement in March 2008.

Chen died on 8 February 2026, at the age of 91.

Government offices
New title	Mayor of Yueyang; 1983–1984	Succeeded by Chu Bo
New title	Director of Hunan Foreign Economic and Trade Commission; 1984–1985	Succeeded by Tao Na (陶纳)
Preceded by Xiong Qingquan	Governor of Hunan; 1989–1994	Succeeded by Yang Zhengwu
Preceded by Zhang Haoruo	Minister of Internal Trade; 1995–1998	Succeeded by Position revoked
Assembly seats
Preceded by Hou Jie	Chairperson of the Population, Resources and Environment Committee of the Chinese People's Political Consultative Conference; 2000–2008	Succeeded by Zhang Weiqing
