= Hu Zhongxiong =

Chinese politician

- 胡忠雄

Communist Party Secretary of Guiyang
- Incumbent
- Assumed office 17 September 2021
- Preceded by: Zhao Deming

Personal details
- Born: January 1966 (age 60) Li County, Hunan, China
- Party: Chinese Communist Party
- Education: Hunan Normal University; Southwest University of Political Science & Law

Hu Zhongxiong (Chinese: 胡忠雄; pinyin: Hú Zhōngxióng; born January 1966) is a Chinese politician who is the current Chinese Communist Party Committee Secretary of Guiyang, in office since September 2021. Previously, he served as head of the United Front Work Department of Guizhou Provincial Committee of the Chinese Communist Party, and vice governor, and before that, mayor of Changsha, party secretary of Yueyang, party secretary and mayor of Yiyang.

== Biography ==
=== Early life and education ===
Hu was born in Li County, Hunan, in January 1966. He entered Hunan Normal University in 1982, majoring in the Department of Politics. After graduating in 1986, he was admitted to Southwest University of Political Science & Law, earning a master's degree in law in 1989.

=== Hunan ===
Hu joined the Chinese Communist Party (CCP) in April 1985. After university, he taught at Hunan Economic Management Cadre College for several years before becoming involved in politics in June 1995, when he was appointed director of Management Committee of Phoenix Park Economic and Technological Development Zone.

He was deputy secretary of Hunan Provincial Committee of the Communist Youth League of China in January 1997, and held that office until April 2002. He then worked in Yiyang, holding positions as deputy party secretary (2002–2015), mayor (2011–2015), and party secretary (2015–2016). In December 2016, he was appointed party secretary of the neighboring Yueyang city, concurrently serving as chairman of Yueyang People's Congress. In January 2018, he was promoted to become mayor and deputy party secretary of Changsha, and party chief of the Party Working Committee of Xiangjiang New Area.

=== Guizhou ===
In 2020, he was transferred from his job in Hunan province to the neighboring Guizhou province. In January, he was promoted to acting vice governor, confirmed on March 6. He was appointed head of the United Front Work Department of the Guizhou Provincial Committee of the CCP in February 2021 and was admitted to member of the standing committee of the CCP Guizhou Provincial Committee, the province's top authority. On September 17, he took office as party secretary of Guiyang and party chief of the Party Working Committee of Gui'an New Area, replacing Zhao Deming.

Party political offices
| Preceded by Xie Chaoying | Secretary of Yiyang Discipline Inspection Commission of the Chinese Communist Party; 2003–2006 | Succeeded by Zhang Yinqiao |
| Preceded by Wei Xuanjun | Communist Party Secretary of Yiyang; 2015–2016 | Succeeded by Qu Hai |
| Preceded by Sheng Ronghua | Communist Party Secretary of Yueyang; 2016–2018 | Succeeded by Liu Hesheng |
| Preceded by Yan Zhaojun | Head of the United Front Work Department of CCP Guizhou Provincial Committee; 2021–2021 | Succeeded by Zhao Deming |
| Preceded by Zhao Deming | Communist Party Secretary of Guiyang; 2021–present | Incumbent |
Government offices
| Preceded by Hu Henghua | Mayor of Yiyang; 2011–2015 | Succeeded by Xu Xianhui |
| Preceded by Chen Wenhao | Mayor of Changsha; 2018–2020 | Succeeded by Zheng Jianxin |
