= Li Wei (politician, born 1953) =

Chinese politician

- 李伟
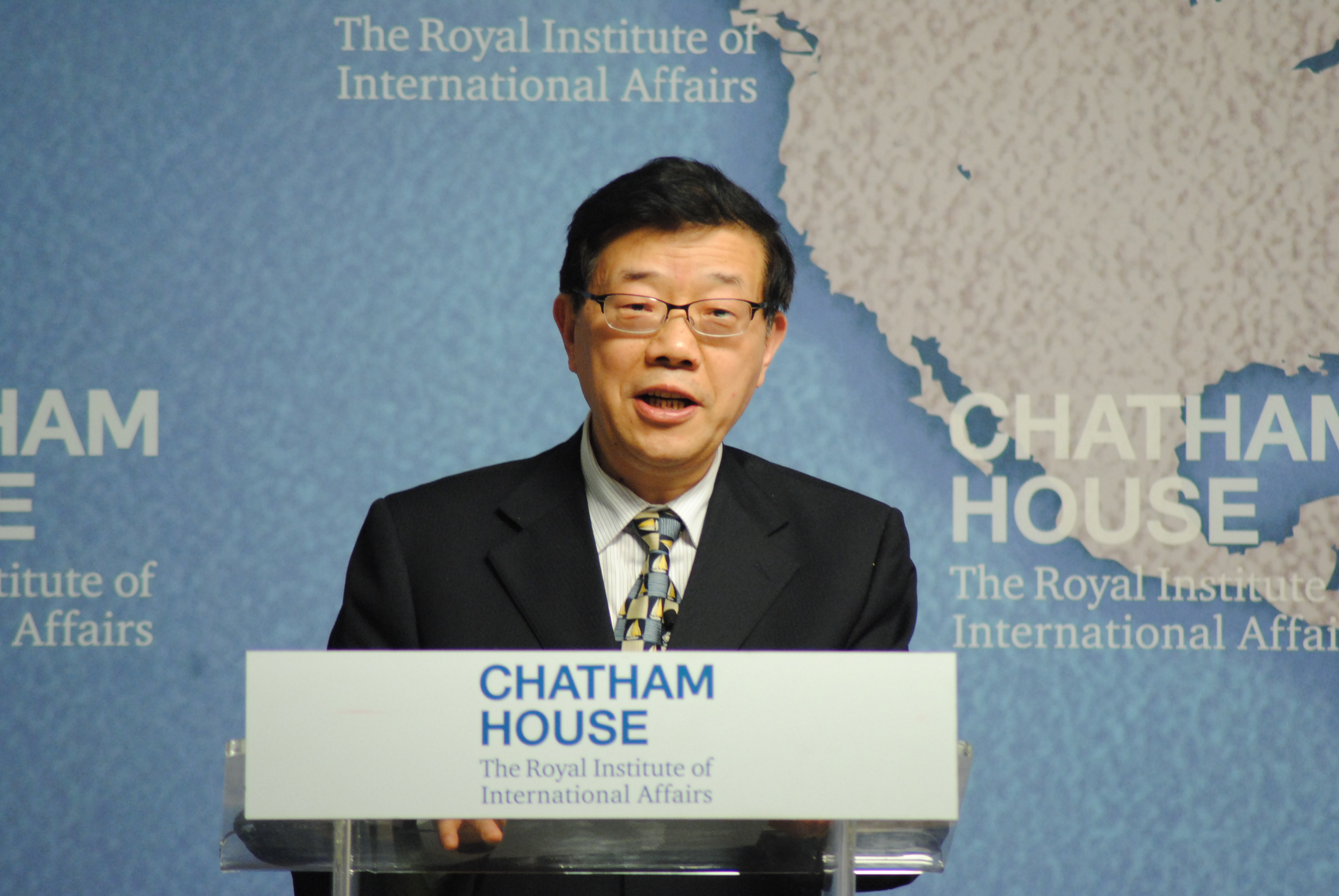
- Li in July 2014

Chairperson of the Population, Resources and Environment Committee of the Chinese People's Political Consultative Conference
- In office 16 March 2018 – 13 March 2023
- Preceded by: Jia Zhibang
- Succeeded by: Che Jun

Director of the Development Research Center of the State Council
- In office April 2011 – May 2019
- Premier: Wen Jiabao; Li Keqiang
- Preceded by: Zhang Yutai
- Succeeded by: Lu Hao

Party Branch Secretary of the Development Research Center of the State Council
- In office July 2010 – March 2011
- Preceded by: Zhang Yutai
- Succeeded by: Liu He

Personal details
- Born: August 1953 (age 73) Feng County, Jiangsu, China
- Party: Chinese Communist Party
- Education: Shanghai Open University; Central Party School of the Chinese Communist Party

Military service
- Allegiance: People's Republic of China
- Branch/service: People's Liberation Army Ground Force
- Years of service: 1970–1976

Chinese name
- Simplified Chinese: 李伟
- Traditional Chinese: 李偉
Transcriptions
Standard Mandarin
- Hanyu Pinyin: Lǐ Wěi

Li Wei (Chinese: 李伟; born August 1953) is a Chinese politician who served as director of the Development Research Center of the State Council between 2011 and 2019.

He was a member of the 18th Central Committee of the Chinese Communist Party and a representative of the 19th National Congress of the Chinese Communist Party. He was a member of the Standing Committee of the 13th Chinese People's Political Consultative Conference.

== Biography ==
Li was born in Feng County, Jiangsu, in August 1953. He graduated from Shanghai Television University (now Shanghai Open University) and the Central Party School of the Chinese Communist Party. During the Down to the Countryside Movement, he became a sent-down youth in March 1969, and soon joined the People's Liberation Army (PLA) in December 1970. Beginning in April 1976, he served in several posts in Shanghai Chemical Import and Export Corporation, including clerk, deputy section chief, secretary of the Communist Youth League of China.

Li joined the Chinese Communist Party (CCP) in April 1973, and got involved in politics in January 1985, when he was appointed an official in the Economic Cadre Division of Organization Department of CCP Shanghai Municipal Committee. Three years later, he became secretary of the General Office of Shanghai Municipal People's Government and CPC Shanghai Municipal Committee.

In April 1991, he was transferred to Beijing and appointed secretary of the General Office of the State Council. He was elevated to director of the Office of the Premier of the State Council in March 1998, concurrently serving as deputy director of the State Council Research Office since June 1998 and then deputy secretary of the Central Financial Work Commission since January 2003. He was chosen as vice president of the China Banking Regulatory Commission in March 2003, a post he kept until October 2005, when he was named deputy director and deputy party secretary of the State-owned Assets Supervision and Administration Commission of the State Council. He served as deputy director of the Development Research Center of the State Council in July 2010, and nine months later was promoted to the director position. In March 2008, he took office as chairperson of the Population, Resources and Environment Committee of the Chinese People's Political Consultative Conference. On 29 May 2019, he stepped down as director of the Development Research Center of the State Council.

Government offices
Preceded by Jiang Yunbao	Director of the Office of the Premier of the State Council; 1998–2003	Succeeded by Qiu Xiaoxiong
Preceded by Zhang Yutai	Director of the Development Research Center of the State Council; 2011–2019	Succeeded by Lu Hao
Party political offices
Preceded by Zhang Yutai	Party Branch Secretary of the Development Research Center of the State Council; 2010–2011	Succeeded by Liu He
Assembly seats
Preceded by Jia Zhibang	Chairperson of the Population, Resources and Environment Committee of the Chinese People's Political Consultative Conference; 2018–present	Incumbent
