= Liu Hesheng =

Chinese politician (born 1962)

- 刘和生

Chairman of Yueyang People's Congress
- In office April 2018 – December 2019
- Preceded by: Hu Zhongxiong
- Succeeded by: Wang Yi'ou

Communist Party Secretary of Yueyang
- In office February 2018 – December 2019
- Preceded by: Hu Zhongxiong
- Succeeded by: Wang Yi'ou

Mayor of Yueyang
- In office July 2015 – February 2018
- Preceded by: Sheng Ronghua
- Succeeded by: Li Aiwu

Personal details
- Born: January 1962 (age 64) Qidong County, Hunan, China
- Party: Chinese Communist Party (1984–2021; expelled)
- Education: Hunan Polytechnic of Environment and Biology; Xiangtan University; Central Party School of the Chinese Communist Party

Chinese name
- Simplified Chinese: 刘和生
- Traditional Chinese: 劉和生
Transcriptions
Standard Mandarin
- Hanyu Pinyin: Liú Héshēng

Liu Hesheng (Chinese: 刘和生; born January 1962) is a former Chinese politician who served as mayor and party secretary of Yueyang from 2015 to 2019, and chairman of Yueyang People's Congress from 2018 to 2019. He was investigated by China's top anti-graft agency in April 2020.

== Biography ==
Liu was born in Qidong County, Hunan, in January 1962. After resuming the college entrance examination, in 1978, he enrolled in Hengyang Branch of Hunan Agricultural College (now Hunan Polytechnic of Environment and Biology). He also studied at Xiangtan University, Central Party School and the University of Baltimore as a part-time student.

After graduating in 1981, he was despatched to Qidong County Bureau of Agriculture as an official. He joined the Chinese Communist Party (CCP) in November 1984. In January 1988, he was transferred to the capital Changsha and assigned to the Organization Department of CCP Hunan Provincial Committee. In October 2000, he was reassigned to You County, a county under the jurisdiction of Zhuzhou, where he was appointed party secretary, the top political position in the county. One year later, he was recalled to Changsha and became vice president of Hunan Federation of Trade Unions. In June 2006, he was transferred to central Loudi city and admitted to member of the standing committee of the CCP Loudi Municipal Committee, the city's top authority. In September, he was made secretary of its Commission for Discipline Inspection, the party's agency in charge of anti-corruption efforts. In June 2010, he rose to become executive vice mayor. In May 2013, he was appointed deputy party secretary of Chenzhou, he remained in that position until June 2015, when he was transferred to Yueyang and named acting mayor of the city. He was installed as mayor the next month. He moved up the ranks to become party secretary in February 2018 and chairman of Yueyang People's Congress in April of that same year. In January 2020, he took office of vice chairperson of the Hunan People's Congress Social Development Affairs Committee, but having held the position for only three months, while he was put under investigation for alleged "serious violations of discipline and laws".

=== Downfall ===
On 21 April 2020, he has been placed under investigation for "serious violations of discipline and laws" by the Central Commission for Discipline Inspection (CCDI), the party's internal disciplinary body, and the National Supervisory Commission, the highest anti-corruption agency of China. Liu became the sixth top political official in cities and prefectures of Hunan province to be targeted by China's top anticorruption watchdog since China's continues anti-corruption battle at all levels of government, military and ruling Communist Party was launched in 2012, behind Li Dalun, Cheng Haibo, Li Yilong, Ma Yong and Chen Sanxin. On August 11, his qualification for delegates to the 13th Hunan Congress was terminated. He was detained by the Hunan Provincial People's Procuratorate on October 26. On December 20, he was indicted on suspicion of accepting bribes.

On 14 July 2021, he was expelled from the Communist Party and dismissed from public office.

Government offices
Preceded by Sheng Ronghua	Mayor of Yueyang; 2015–2018	Succeeded by Li Aiwu
Party political offices
Preceded by Hu Zhongxiong	Communist Party Secretary of Yueyang; 2018–2019	Succeeded by Wang Yi'ou
Assembly seats
Preceded by Hu Zhongxiong	Chairman of Yueyang People's Congress; 2018–2019	Succeeded by Wang Yi'ou
