= Hu Henghua =

Chinese politician (born 1963)

- 胡衡华
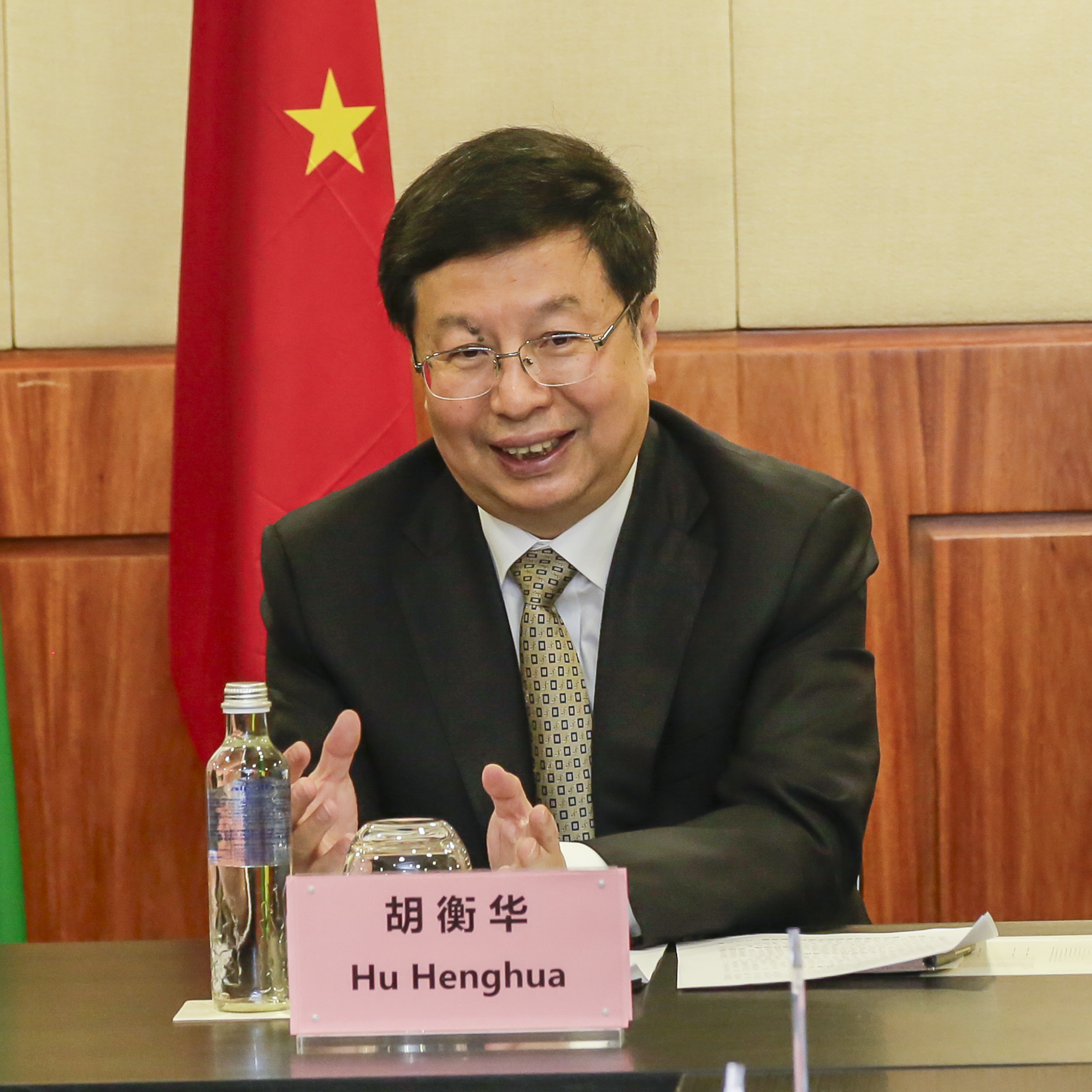

Mayor of Chongqing
- In office 30 December 2021 – 27 May 2026
- Secretary: Chen Min'er; Yuan Jiajun
- Preceded by: Tang Liangzhi
- Succeeded by: Chen Xinwu

Deputy Communist Party Secretary of Shaanxi
- In office October 2020 – December 2021
- Secretary: Liu Guozhong
- Preceded by: He Rong

Communist Party Secretary of Changsha
- In office July 2017 – October 2020
- Mayor: Chen Wenhao; Hu Zhongxiong; Zheng Jianxin
- Preceded by: Yi Lianhong
- Succeeded by: Wu Guiying

Mayor of Changsha
- In office December 2013 – November 2016
- Secretary: Yi Lianhong
- Preceded by: Zhang Jianfei
- Succeeded by: Chen Wenhao

Personal details
- Born: June 1963 (age 63) Hengnan County, Hunan, China
- Party: Chinese Communist Party
- Education: Xi'an University of Architecture and Technology; Hunan University

Chinese name
- Simplified Chinese: 胡衡华
- Traditional Chinese: 胡衡華
Transcriptions
Standard Mandarin
- Hanyu Pinyin: Hú Hénghuá

Hu Henghua (Chinese: 胡衡华; born June 1963) is a Chinese politician who served as deputy party secretary and mayor of Chongqing previously. He is an alternate of the 19th Central Committee of the Chinese Communist Party. He was a representative of the 17th and 18th National Congress of the Chinese Communist Party and a deputy to the 12th National People's Congress.

== Early life and education ==
Hu was born in Hengnan County, Hunan, in June 1963. He graduated from Xi'an University of Architecture and Technology and Hunan University.

== Career in Hunan ==
He entered the workforce in July 1983, and joined the Chinese Communist Party in June 1985. Beginning in 1983, he served in several posts in Hengyang Steel Pipe Factory, including workshop director, deputy factory director, and general manager. He began his political career in July 2005, when he was appointed director and party branch secretary of Hunan Provincial Economic Commission. In March 2008, he was named acting mayor and deputy party secretary of Yiyang, replacing Ma Yong. In January 2001, he was appointed director and party branch secretary of Hunan Provincial Development and Reform Commission.

He became acting mayor of Changsha, the capital city under the jurisdiction of Hunan province, in December 2013, and was installed in January 2014. He concurrently served as deputy party secretary of Changsha and secretary of the Party Working Committee of Xiangjiang New Area. In November 2016, he was admitted to member of the standing committee of the CPC Hunan Provincial Committee, the province's top authority. One month later, he was appointed director of Hunan Provincial State Owned Assets Supervision and Administration Commission. In July 2017, he was promoted to party secretary of Changsha, the top political position in the city, concurrently holding the position of first secretary of CPC Changsha Garrison Command Committee.

== Career in Shaanxi ==
In October 2020, he was transferred to northwest China's Shaanxi province and appointed deputy party secretary.

== Career in Chongqing ==
In December 2021, he was appointed deputy party secretary of Chongqing, succeeding Tang Liangzhi. On December 31, he was named acting mayor of Chongqing.

== Investigation ==
On 20 March 2026, Hu was suspected of "serious violations of laws and regulations" by the Central Commission for Discipline Inspection (CCDI), the party's internal disciplinary body, and the National Supervisory Commission, the highest anti-corruption agency of China. Hu's post was resigned on 27 May 2026.

Government offices
Preceded by Lin Wu	Director of Hunan Provincial Economic Commission; 2005–2008	Succeeded by Xie Chaoying
Preceded by Ma Yong	Mayor of Yiyang; 2008–2011	Succeeded by Hu Zhongxiong
Preceded by Jiang Zuobin	Director of Hunan Provincial Development and Reform Commission; 2011–2013	Succeeded by Xie Jianhua
Preceded by Zhang Jianfei	Mayor of Changsha; 2013–2016	Succeeded by Chen Wenhao
Preceded by Tang Liangzhi	Mayor of Chongqing; 2021–2026	Succeeded by Chen Xinwu
Party political offices
Preceded by Yi Lianhong	Communist Party Secretary of Changsha; 2017–2020	Succeeded by Wu Guiying
Preceded by He Rong	Deputy Communist Party Secretary of Shaanxi; 2020–2021	Succeeded by Zhao Gang
Preceded by Tang Liangzhi	Deputy Communist Party Secretary of Chongqing; 2021–present	Incumbent
