= Nanjing College for Population Programme Management =

Nanjing College for Population Programme Management (Chinese: 南京人口管理干部学院; pinyin: Nánjīng Rénkǒuguǎnlǐ Gànbù Xuéyuàn) was a college in Nanjing, Jiangsu, China. Being established in 1980 and completed in 1984, the college originated the Nanjing Family Planning Cadre Training Center. It was once the sole institute administered by then National Population and Family Planning Commission until 2001, and provided degree education since 1985. It began to enrol undergraduates since 1998. Besides, United Nations Population Fund had given great support to the college.

The college was incorporated into Nanjing University of Posts and Telecommunications in 2013 with its mostly Suojincun Campus, while the rest belongs to the Nanjing International Training Center For Population Program.

== Presidents ==
- Yao Jinghuang (Chinese: 姚静篁)
- Si Yuanzhong (Chinese: 司元忠)
- Wang Yonghong (Chinese: 王咏红, Jan. 2002– Dec. 2002)
- Fu Dayou (Chinese: 傅大友, 2003–2005)
- Ling Yingbin (Chinese: 凌迎兵, 2008–2013, 2014 administratively)
