= Ren Zhengfei =

Chinese entrepreneur and engineer (born 1944)

- 任正非
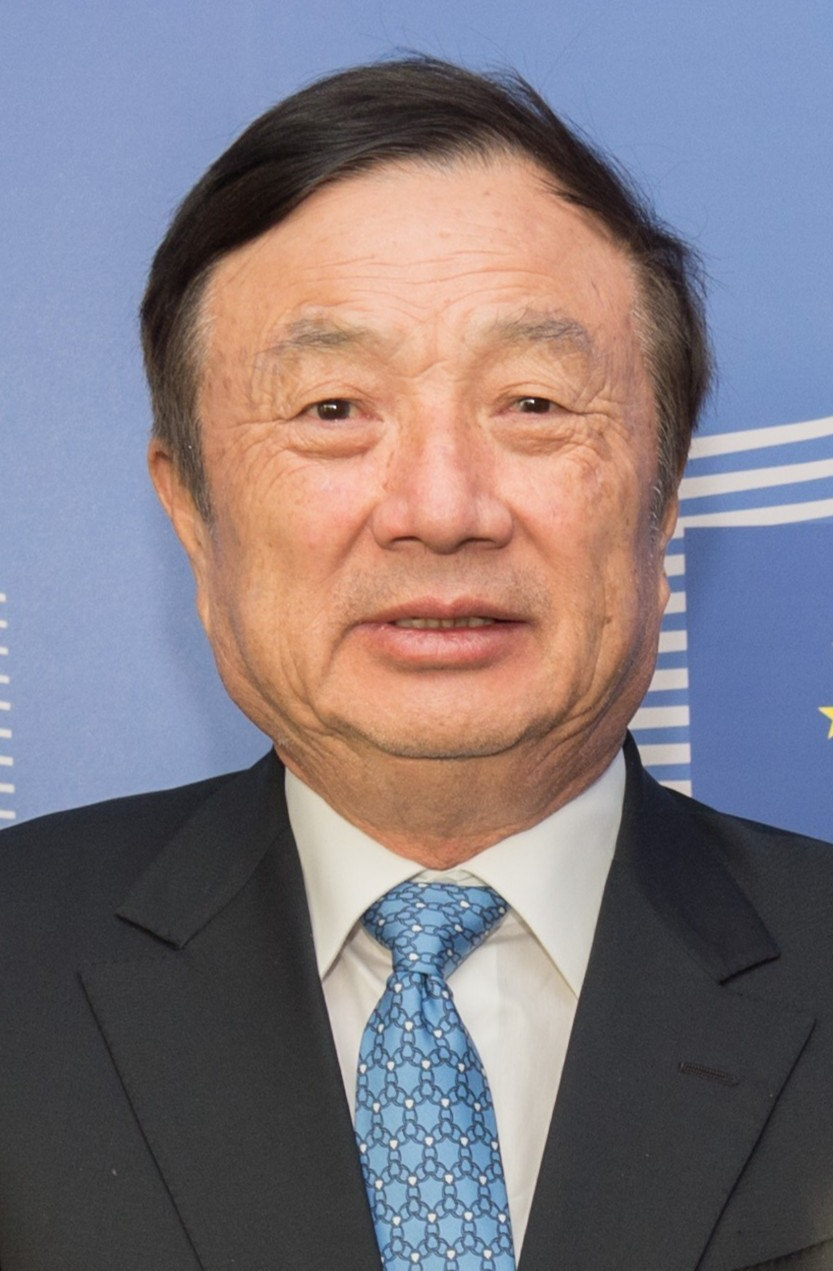
- Ren in 2016

CEO of Huawei Technologies Co., Ltd.
- Incumbent
- Assumed office 15 September 1987
- Chairman: Liang Hua（梁华）

Vice Chairman of Huawei Technologies Co., Ltd.
- In office 15 September 1987 – 22 November 2019
- Chairman: Sun Yafang（孙亚芳）
- Succeeded by: Meng Wanzhou（孟晚舟）

Representative of the 12th National Congress of the Chinese Communist Party
- In office 1 September 1982 – 11 September 1982
- Chairman: Hu Yaobang（胡耀邦）

Personal details
- Born: 25 October 1944 (age 82) Zhenning County, Guizhou, China
- Party: Chinese Communist Party
- Spouse(s): Meng Jun (former); Yao Ling (current)
- Children: Meng Wanzhou; Yao Anna; Ren Ping
- Education: Chongqing Jianzhu University (now Chongqing University)

Military service
- Allegiance: People's Republic of China
- Branch/service: People's Liberation Army Ground Force
- Years of service: 1970–1982
- Unit: PLA Capital Construction Engineering Corps
- Scientific career
- Fields: Aerodynamics
- Workplaces: Liaoyang Petroleum Chemical Fiber General Factory

Chinese name
- Chinese: 任正非
Transcriptions
Standard Mandarin
- Hanyu Pinyin: Rén Zhèngfēi
- IPA: [ɻə̌n ʈʂə̂ŋféɪ]
Yue: Cantonese
- Yale Romanization: Yahm Jingfēi
- Jyutping: Jam6 Zing3-fei1
- IPA: [jɐm˨ tsɪŋ˧fej˥]

Ren Zhengfei (Chinese: 任正非; born 25 October 1944) is a Chinese entrepreneur and engineer who is the founder and CEO of Huawei Technologies, which is located in Shenzhen, China, and is one of the world's largest manufacturers of telecommunications equipment and smartphones.

== Early life ==
Ren was born on 25 October 1944, in Zhenning County, Guizhou. His grandfather, Ren Sanhe (任三和), was a master chef from Rendian Village (任店村), Pujiang County, Zhejiang, and who specialized in curing ham. His father, Ren Musheng (任木生), with the courtesy name Moxun (摩逊; Móxùn), failed to complete university studies when Ren Zhengfei's grandfather died a year prior to his graduation.

During the Japanese occupation, his father migrated south to Guangzhou to work in a military factory of the Nationalist government as an accounts clerk. After 1949, his father was appointed as the president of No. 1 Middle School of Duyun (都匀一中), where he met Ren Zhengfei's mother Cheng Yuanzhao (程远昭), a senior teacher at the school; his elder brother became a member of the CCP in 1958. Ren has five younger sisters and one younger brother.

=== Education ===
He spent his primary and junior high school years in a mountain village.

In elementary and middle school, Ren was known for being withdrawn and unsociable, and he was denied admission to the Communist Youth League due to his insufficiently developed spirit of collectivism. In high school, he always wore a single-layer coat due to poverty.

In 1960, in his third year of high school, there was a serious famine in Guizhou Province. At this time, Ren's family was starving. In order to support his family, Ren implemented a strict system of food distribution in his family. To cope with hunger, Ren often went to the mountains to pick wild fruits instead of grain. No matter how hungry he was, he did not eat the rations of his family. Thanks to this, none of his brothers and sisters starved to death. To relieve his hunger, Ren mixed rice bran and vegetables together, which he stopped when his father found out. With the Chinese college examinations approaching, Cheng Yuanzhao (程远昭), even though poor, gave him a scallion pancake every morning. Ren later thought the pancake was crucial to his future achievements.

In 1963, 19-year-old Ren was admitted to Chongqing Institute of Architectural Engineering (later merged into Chongqing University) to major in building services engineering. Cheng Yuanzhao made him two white shirts and a pair of sheets, which he wore throughout four years of college.

In 1966, when Mao Zedong launched the Cultural Revolution, Ren, who was studying in college, received a letter mentioning that his father had been dismissed and criticized for his experience working in the Kuomintang's 412 military factory. Ren boarded a train surrounded by Red Guards who were asking the passengers about their background. Because he replied that his father was a teacher, Ren was pushed off the train by them, so he had to walk home. Ren told his family that there were also "infights" in college, and basically no one attended classes, but his father told him that knowledge was important and encouraged him to use it to help his brothers and sisters.

After returning to college, Ren taught himself computers, digital technology, automatic control, logic, philosophy, and three foreign languages. Ren collected leaflets and sent them to his mother to encourage his father who was in trouble. In one piece of paper, there is a passage from Zhou Enlai: "cadres should seek truth from facts. If they are not, do not admit it at random. Things will always be figured out." Cheng Yuanzhao passed this passage on to his father. Because of this note, his father did not commit suicide. In 1970, he obeyed a policy directed at all college students in leaving school to join the army for training.

== Early career ==
In 1968, Ren Zhengfei graduated from university and was assigned to the 304th Battalion of the 31st Detachment of the Infrastructure Engineering Corps in Anshun, which was founded in 1966, to participate in the construction of the aircraft factory of the 011 base.

In 1974, in order to build for industrial modernization, he established Liaoyang Petrochemical Fiber General Factory in Liaoyang.

In the same year, Ren was drafted into the army and joined the 22nd detachment of the Infrastructure Engineering Corps of the People's Liberation Army (PLA). He served as a technician and engineer, working on automation processes in the chemical industry. While serving in the PLA, Ren extensively studied Mao Zedong's writings, particularly Quotations of Chairman Mao and Selected Works of Mao Zedong. He received several awards for his proficiency and excellence in Maoist theory.

In March 1978, 33-year-old Ren went to Beijing to attend the National Science Conference, which was attended by more than 6000 delegates. The same year, Ren joined the Chinese Communist Party (CCP). Throughout most of his military career, Ren was denied entry to the Communist Party due to his parents' social background and his father's work for the Nationalist government. He was only able to join the Party shortly before his retirement.

In 1982, the government of the People's Republic of China readjusted its economic and military system and reduced the size of the army. Ren was transferred to a scientific research base. At this time, Ren's wife went to work in the Shenzhen Southern Oil Group (深圳市南油 (集团)有限公司). Subsequently, he made a job transfer, ending 11 years of army life, and went south to Shenzhen with his sons and daughters. The same year, he attended the 12th National Congress of the Chinese Communist Party. After joining the Southern Oil Group, Ren could not stand the bureaucracy of some department leaders who were content with the status quo and did not want to make progress. He requested that one of the company's subsidiaries be handed over to him, but the request was not approved.

In 1983, he was appointed deputy general manager of an electronics company owned by the group. Soon after, Ren was cheated out of more than 2 million yuan by a businessman. At that time, his monthly salary in the mainland was less than 100 yuan. Ren's first job ended in resignation. After resigning, Ren divorced his wife, and he rented a house of no more than ten square meters with his parents and nephews.

== Huawei ==
=== Establishing the company ===
In 1987, Ren Zhengfei, 43, and his partners founded Shenzhen Huawei Technology Co., Ltd., which means "Having a Heart connected to Chunghua, and making a difference" (心系中华，有所作为). At the beginning of establishing the company, friends recommended him to make money with high profits, but Ren thought that was not a long-term solution.

After the introduction of a friend, he began to sell industrial instruments, but this was not economically viable in the long term. Later, Ren earned the first money for the company by selling HAX Technologies' program-controlled switches on consignment. At that time, the Chinese market was full of products from various countries. Faced with the gradual decline in switch prices and competition, Ren made a decision to import components made in China and hire people to assemble small user exchanges.

He has been president of Huawei since 1988.

In September 1991, Ren assembled a Huawei program-controlled switch with his employees. As Huawei's products are cheap, supply exceeded demand. Because of a shortage of domestic parts, Ren continued to assemble products while starting research and development. Like his employees, Ren reportedly ate and lived in the factory, going so far as to make soup for his employees in the evening. Due to the long lead time of research and development and the shortage of capital, Ren had to borrow at usurious rates to maintain normal operations of the company. Soon, Ren promoted the new BH03 switch. In order to solve the sales problem, he began to accept agents.

In 1992, Ren Zhengfei invited professors and students from Huazhong Technology University, Tsinghua University, and others to visit.

In early 1993, more than 270 Huawei employees held a 1992 summary meeting in a small auditorium in Shekou, Shenzhen. Ren decided to use switches in the R and D Bureau to enter the field of public telephones and telecommunications. At the meeting, he presented 100 gold medals to outstanding employees and the boss of Hongnian Company (鸿年公司) in Hong Kong, which supported the start of the Huawei. Ren hired Xu Wenwei (徐文伟) from the nearby Yilida Group (亿利达集团) and put him in charge of the hardware.

When I founded the company, I designed the Employee stock Ownership System to unite employees through benefit sharing. At that time, I did not understand the option system, still less did I know that the West was very developed in this area...Only based on my past life setbacks, I realized that I should share the responsibilities and benefits with the employees.

— December 2011, Ren Zhengfei "spring river flows eastward（一春江水向东流）"

In May 1993, Ren presided over a meeting of marketing managers and officially launched the JK1000 office telephone, after which more than 200 units were sold. In order to acquire talent, Ren also set up a "Talent recommendation Award". JK1000 products focus on the use of analog circuit technology rather than digital circuit technology, so that Ren made the mistake of not keeping up with the times. At that time, the company was short of money, and Huawei was on half pay, and the other half was recorded in the account. Ren set up a "everyone shareholding system": converting half of his recorded wages into shares in Huawei, which can be exchanged for cash when he resigns.

In March 1996, Ren invited professors to form a Huawei basic law drafting group. The Huawei basic law was ready by 1998.

Ren has sought to ingrain CCP ideology into Huawei's management and corporate culture. He states that if a conflict between the interests of Huawei and those of the CCP's arose, he would "choose the CCP whose interest is to serve the people and all human beings" and that he could not betray the principle of serving all human beings.

=== Acquisition of Harbor Network Company ===
In 1998, due to contention between Li Yinan (李一男) and Ren Ping and Zheng Baoyong (郑宝用), Ren transferred Li from the Central Research Department to take charge of the product department and to serve as head of the marketing department. Ren sent the vice president to communicate with him many times, without success, but gave him a good sendoff.

In 2002, in the face of Harbor Network Company gaining market share and poaching Huawei employees, Ren Zhengfei withdrew the license granted by Huawei to Harbor Network to sell Huawei products, and set up a "hit Hong Kong Office" to block Harbor Network Company.

In 2005, Ren Zhengfei brought all the voice teams of the Harbor Shenzhen Research Institute to Huawei for 1 million.

On 10 May 2006, Ren Zhengfei met with Li Yinan at Huawei 3COM headquarters in Hangzhou.

=== Deal with Cisco ===
In January 2003, Cisco Systems hired an American lawyer to file a more than 70-page complaint against Huawei in United States federal court in Marshall, Texas. A neutral expert found that Cisco's source code had been used in Huawei's products. Cisco agreed to drop the case in July 2024.

=== Expanding to overseas markets ===
Ren Zhengfei aims to gain international market share in four stages: the first is to penetrate the neighboring Hong Kong market; the second is to gain market share in Russia and South America; the third is aimed at Southeast Asia, the Middle East, and Africa; and the fourth is to aim at developed countries. In order to enter the international market, Ren put forward the idea of "Huawei globalization": the globalization of management, R and D, talent, sales, and corporate culture.

Since 1996, Ren has successively hired IBM and other American and British companies to reform Huawei's R and D, supply chain, financial and market systems, integrate its product development system, integrate its supply chain, human resource management, financial management, and quality control.

In 1996, Ren led Huawei to compete in the international market, partnering with Li Ka-shing's Hutchison Telecom: Huawei provided it with commercial network products with narrow-band switches as its core products.

In 1997, Ren sent a delegation to visit Russia. As early as three years ago, he aimed at the huge Russian market, which had economic difficulties and lack of industrial upgrading. On 8 April, Ren went to Ufa, Russia, to attend the signing ceremony of "BertoHuawei", a joint venture company between Huawei and Russia.

=== Leadership and ownership ===
Ren now serves as a deputy chairman of the Board of Directors, but he is not currently one of the three rotating CEOs. The company had an annual revenue of US$92.5 billion in 2017. Ren holds 1.42% of the shares of Huawei, valued at US$450 million in 2010. Huawei is essentially independent of Ren because its shares are held by its employees, but the ownership structure remains opaque.

=== Ties with the People's Liberation Army ===
Ren's possible ties with the PLA have been cited by the Indian government as a security concern in not allowing Huawei to win certain contracts in India. Similar fears are shared by other countries.

In the United States such fears led to the collapse of Huawei's efforts to buy 3Com and forced SoftBank to greatly sever ties with Huawei in order to have its takeover of Sprint Nextel acquire U.S. national-security clearance. In the United Kingdom the Intelligence and Security Committee has recommended the removal of Huawei's equipment due to fears of its being used to facilitate spying by the Chinese.

== Family and interests ==
Ren's younger brother, Ren Shulu (任樹錄 in Chinese and Steven Ren in English, born in 1956), is a graduate of Yunnan University and has been an employee of Huawei since 1992. He currently serves as a member of the Supervisory Board and head of the company's logistics support division.

Ren's first wife was Meng Jun (孟军), the daughter of Meng Dongbo (孟东波), a former deputy governor of Sichuan Province. They had two children: daughter Meng Wanzhou (孟晚舟) and son Ren Ping (任平), both of whom initially took up their mother's surname Meng (孟). Meng Wanzhou (Sabrina Meng in English, born in 1972), earned a master's degree from Huazhong University of Science and Technology in 1998. She has worked at Huawei since 1993 and is currently the company's chief financial officer (CFO).

After their divorce, Ren married Yao Ling (姚凌), with whom he had another daughter, Annabel Yao, who is 25 years younger than Meng Wanzhou. As of December 2018, Annabel is a ballet dancer and a computer science student at Harvard University and made a high-profile debut at Le Bal des Débutantes in Paris in 2018.

Despite being Huawei's CEO, Ren is a user of Apple products and has stated that the "iPhone has a good ecosystem and when my family are abroad, I still buy them iPhones, so one can't narrowly think love for Huawei should mean loving Huawei phones."

Ren Zhengfei has a passion for reading books on politics, economics, humanities, literature, and art. He prefers historical literature the most and is least interested in fiction and management theory. He explains this choice as follows

Fiction tells imaginary stories — and they are too far removed from reality. As for management books, they are written by professors sitting behind closed doors in their offices — which stifles their creativity. It is impossible to reduce dynamic corporate management to a fixed set of dogmas.

— Ren Zhengfei

Ren is a fan of the TV series The Qin Empire, which tells the story of the reforms of Chinese statesman Shang Yang. He purchased thousands of copies of the series for Huawei employees.

Of all Chinese political leaders, Ren Zhengfei holds Deng Xiaoping in the highest regard, repeatedly calling him the greatest reformer in China's history. Among foreign politicians, Ren has the greatest respect for Yitzhak Rabin, and he even refers to himself as a student of the former Israeli prime minister.

== Accolades ==
- In 2005, Ren Zhengfei and Zhang Ziyi (章子怡) were included in Time Magazine's list of the 100 most influential people in the world.
- In 2018, he was named one of the "100 Outstanding Private entrepreneurs in the 40 years of Reform and opening up".

Business positions
New title	Vice Chairman of Huawei Technologies Co., Ltd. 1987–2019	Succeeded by Meng Wanzhou
New title	CEO of Huawei Technologies Co., Ltd. 1987–present	Incumbent
