= Peng Peiyun =

Chinese politician (1929–2025)

- 彭珮云
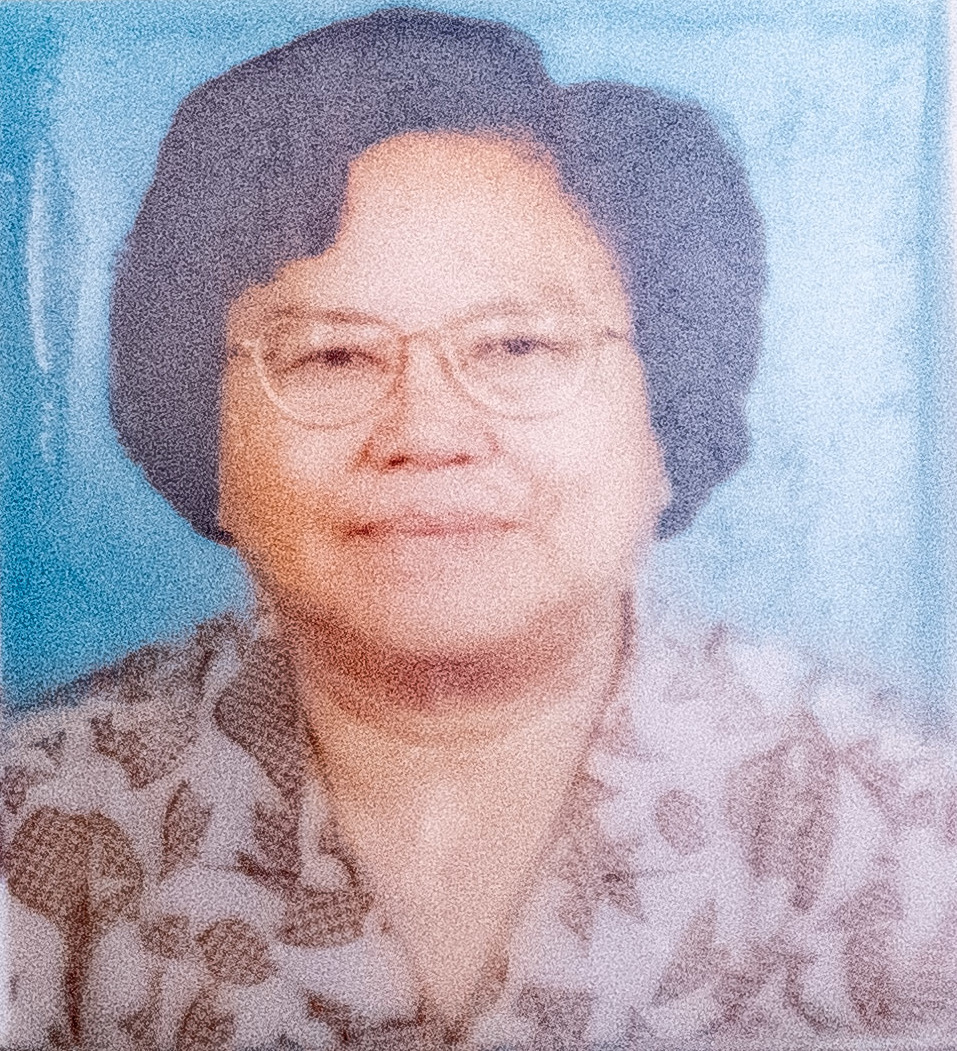

Chairperson of the Red Cross Society of China
- In office 1999–2009
- Preceded by: Qian Zhengying
- Succeeded by: Hua Jianmin

President of the All-China Women's Federation
- In office 1998–2003
- Preceded by: Chen Muhua
- Succeeded by: Gu Xiulian

Chairperson of National Family Planning Commission
- In office January 1988 – March 1998
- Preceded by: Wang Wei
- Succeeded by: Zhang Weiqing

Personal details
- Born: 25 December 1929 Liuyang, Hunan, China
- Died: 21 December 2025 (aged 95) Beijing, China
- Party: Chinese Communist Party (1946–2009)
- Spouse: Wang Hanbin
- Children: 2
- Education: Tsinghua University

Chinese name
- Simplified Chinese: 彭珮云
- Traditional Chinese: 彭珮雲
Transcriptions
Standard Mandarin
- Hanyu Pinyin: Péng Pèiyún

Peng Peiyun (Chinese: 彭珮云; 25 December 1929 – 21 December 2025) was a Chinese politician who was head of China's National Population and Family Planning Commission from 1988 to 1998.

== Early life and career ==
Peng was born in Liuyang, Hunan, on 25 December 1929. She was admitted to the National Southwestern Associated University at 15. She graduated from Qinghua University and joined the Chinese Communist Party (CCP) in 1946. She held several positions in the CCP branches in public education institutions. She was assigned to the deputy secretary of the CCP committee in Beijing University before she was denounced by Nie Yuanzi, demoted and sent to the countryside during the Cultural Revolution.

She was rehabilitated near the end of the Cultural Revolution. She entered the Ministry of Education and became the vice minister before she was assigned the Minister of the National Family Planning Commission. In 1993 she became a member of the State Council. In 1998, she was elected the Vice Chairperson of the Standing Committee of the National People's Congress and the Chairwoman of the All-China Women's Federation. In 1999, she was elected the Chairperson of the Red Cross Society of China. She was reelected to the same position in 2004.

Peng was elected as a delegate to the 12th and 13th CCP National Congresses and to the 14th and 15th CCP Central Committees.

== Personal life and death ==
Peng married Wang Hanbin, a PRC politician who was also elected the vice chairperson of the standing committee of the National People's Congress and CCP Central Committee. The couple had four children. She died in Beijing on 21 December 2025 at the age of 95. Immediately following her death, Peng was widely castigated on Chinese social media due to the long-term social effects of the one-child policy of which she was the co-creator.

Political offices
| Preceded by Chen Muhua | Chairperson of All-China Women's Federation; 1998–2003 | Succeeded by Gu Xiulian |
| Preceded by Wang Wei | Chairperson of National Family Planning Commission; 1988–1998 | Succeeded by Zhang Weiqing |
| Preceded by Qian Zhengying | Chairperson of the Red Cross Society of China; 1999–2009 | Succeeded by Hua Jianmin |
