= Zhang Weiqing =

Chinese politician

- 张维庆

Chairperson of the Population, Resources and Environment Committee of the Chinese People's Political Consultative Conference
- In office March 2008 – March 2013
- Preceded by: Chen Bangzhu
- Succeeded by: Jia Zhibang

Director of the National Population and Family Planning Commission
- In office March 1998 – March 2008
- Preceded by: Peng Peiyun
- Succeeded by: Li Bin

Personal details
- Born: March 1944 (age 82) Lintong County, Shaanxi, China
- Party: Chinese Communist Party
- Education: Peking University

Chinese name
- Simplified Chinese: 张维庆
- Traditional Chinese: 張維慶
Transcriptions
Standard Mandarin
- Hanyu Pinyin: Zhāng Wéiqìng

Zhang Weiqing (Chinese: 张维庆; born March 1944) is a Chinese politician who served as director of the National Population and Family Planning Commission from 1998 to 2008. He was a representative of the 14th, 15th, 16th, and 17th National Congress of the Chinese Communist Party. He was a member of the 15th and 16th Central Committee of the Chinese Communist Party.

== Early life and education ==
Zhang was born in Lintong County (now Lintong District of Xi'an), Shaanxi, in March 1944. In 1963, he entered Peking University, majoring in philosophy. After university in 1968, he was sent to do farm work at the 4589 Army Farm, in Shijiazhuang, capital of Hebei.

== Career in Shanxi ==
After a year taught primary school in Baode County, Shanxi in March 1971, he got involved in politics and became secretary of Baode County Committee of the Communist Youth League of China in March 1973. He joined the Chinese Communist Party (CCP) in June 1972. In October 1975, he became deputy party secretary of the county, rising to party secretary the next later. He was party secretary of Huguan County in August 1980, and held that office until April 1982. In August 1982, he was elevated to secretary of Shanxi Provincial Committee of the Communist Youth League of China, but having held the position for only half a year. He was appointed vice governor of Shanxi in March 1983 and two years later was admitted to member of the Standing Committee of the CCP Shanxi Provincial Committee, the province's top authority. He also served as head of the Publicity Department of the CCP Shanxi Provincial Committee from May 1985 to January 1993.

== Career in Beijing ==
In September 1994, he was transferred to Beijing and appointed deputy director of the National Population and Family Planning Commission, and was promoted to the director position in March 1998. In December 2007, he was chosen as president of China Population Association. In March 2008, he took office as chairperson of the Population, Resources and Environment Committee of the Chinese People's Political Consultative Conference.

== Publications ==
- 社会主义改革概论 [Introduction to Socialist Reform] (in Chinese). Beijing: CCP Central Party School Press. 1988. ISBN 9787503500596.
- 中国计划生育概论 [Introduction to Family Planning in China] (in Chinese). Beijing: China Population Publishing House. 1998. ISBN 9787800795084.
- 新时期人口和计划生育工作读本 [A Reader on Population and Family Planning Work in the New Era] (in Chinese). Beijing: China Population Publishing House. 2003. ISBN 9787800798382.
- 新人口礼赞 [New Population Praise] (in Chinese). Beijing: China Population Publishing House. 2007. ISBN 9787802025035.
- 统筹解决人口问题读本 [A Reader on Solving the Population Problems in an Overall Way] (in Chinese). Beijing: China Population Publishing House. 2007. ISBN 9787802024953.
- 改革开放与中国人口发展 [Reform and Opening Up and China's Population Development] (in Chinese). Beijing: Social Sciences Academic Press. 2009. ISBN 9787509707746.
- 促进人口长期均衡发展 [Promoting Long-Term Balanced Population Development] (in Chinese). Beijing: China Population Publishing House. 2010. ISBN 9787510106262.

Government offices
Preceded by Scomo Peng	Director of the National Population and Family Planning Commission; 1998–2008	Succeeded by Li Bin
Assembly seats
Preceded by Chen Bangzhu	Chairperson of the Population, Resources and Environment Committee of the Chinese People's Political Consultative Conference; 2008–2013	Succeeded by Jia Zhibang
