= Chen Muhua =

Chinese Communist revolutionary and politician

- 陈慕华
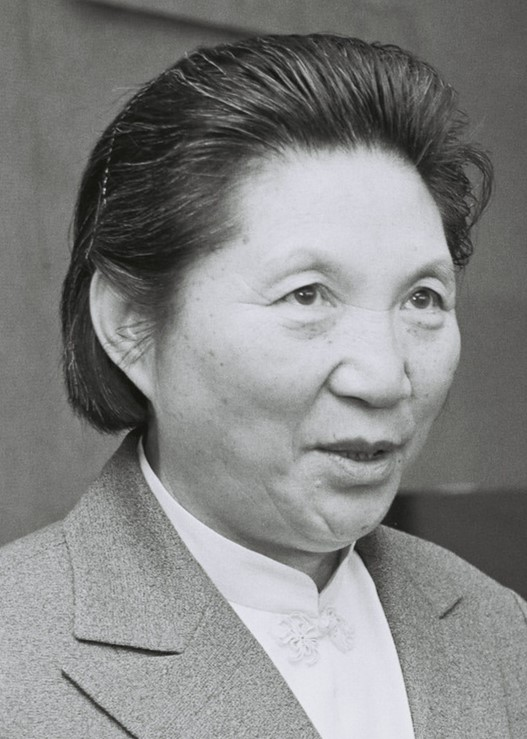

Vice Chairwoman of the Standing Committee of the National People's Congress
- In office 8 April 1988 – 16 March 1998
- Chairman: Qiao Shi

Chairwoman of the All-China Women's Federation
- In office September 1988 – September 1998
- Preceded by: Kang Keqing
- Succeeded by: Peng Peiyun

Governor of the People's Bank of China
- In office 21 March 1985 – 12 April 1988
- Premier: Zhao Ziyang
- Preceded by: Lü Peijian
- Succeeded by: Li Guixian

State Councilor of China
- In office 4 May 1982 – 9 April 1988
- Premier: Zhao Ziyang; Li Peng

Vice Premier of China
- In office 5 March 1978 – 4 May 1982
- Premier: Zhao Ziyang

Personal details
- Born: 1921 Qingtian County, Zhejiang, China
- Died: 12 May 2011 (aged 90) Beijing, China
- Party: Chinese Communist Party
- Spouse: Zhong Yi
- Children: 4 daughters
- Education: Counter-Japanese Military and Political University

Chen Muhua (Chinese: 陈慕华; 1921 – 12 May 2011) was a Chinese Communist revolutionary and politician who served as Vice Premier, State Councilor, Minister of Foreign Economic Relations and Trade, Commissioner of the National Family Planning Commission, Governor of the People's Bank of China, and Chairwoman of the All-China Women's Federation. She was an alternate member of the Politburo of the Chinese Communist Party, one of the few women to have entered China's top decision-making body.

== Early life ==
Chen Muhua was born in 1921 in Qingtian County, Zhejiang Province, during the Republic of China period. Her uncle was a Kuomintang air force official who helped her complete high school education, but she was sympathetic to the Communist cause and went to Yan'an, the wartime base of the Communists, in 1938, after the outbreak of the Second Sino-Japanese War. She told her mother that she would return in six months, but was unable to go home until the end of the war in 1945, when her mother had already died.

Chen studied military science at the Counter-Japanese Military and Political University in Yan'an, and joined the Chinese Communist Party. Her teachers included Zhu De, Chen Yun, and Otto Braun (known in China as "Li De"). During the Yan'an Rectification Movement, she was subject to constant investigation because of her Kuomintang uncle, despite being pregnant. She was forced to give away her daughter when she was born in 1943. The investigation ended only with the intervention of Zhou Enlai. During the Chinese Civil War, she worked a number of jobs in the Rehe Military Region.

== People's Republic of China ==
After the founding of the People's Republic of China in 1949, Chen worked in economic areas, serving as head of the Railway and Long-term Planning offices of the State Planning Commission's Transport Bureau in the 1950s. In the 1960s, she worked in the Foreign Economic Relations General Liaison Office, where she was in charge of China's foreign aid to African countries.

During the Cultural Revolution, Chen was labeled a "capitalist roader", partly because she had suggested that cadres dealing with foreign countries should learn foreign languages. There was also rumour that Chen Cheng, the Kuomintang Vice-president of the Republic of China on Taiwan, was her uncle. Chen Muhua's brother was persecuted to death in Heilongjiang Province.

Chen was politically rehabilitated and appointed Deputy Minister of Foreign Economic Relations and Trade in 1970, reporting directly to Premier Zhou Enlai.

In 1978, Chen became a vice premier (and a vice premier-level state councilor after 1982), the highest non-honorary government position achieved by a woman at the time. As Vice Premier, Chen was an important figure in dealing with economic issues, international trade, and foreign aid.

When China initiated its family planning policy in the early 1980s, she was put in charge of the National Family Planning Commission. She also served as Minister of Foreign Economic Relations and Trade, and implemented policies that encouraged export, which grew to over US$30 billion. In 1985, she was appointed Governor of the People's Bank of China (PBOC), China's central bank. Under her leadership, China became a member of the Asian Development Bank (ADB) in 1986. She served as a board member of the ADB, as well as the African Development Bank. After leaving her PBOC post in 1988, she was appointed chairwoman of the All-China Women's Federation.

Chen Muhua was an alternate member of the Politburo of the Chinese Communist Party, one of the few women to have entered China's top decision-making body. Although Jiang Qing, Ye Qun, and Deng Yingchao also became Politburo members, they were all wives of China's top leaders and did not hold executive positions. She successfully argued for quotas to increased women representation in Chinese political bodies.

== Family ==
In 1940, Chen married Zhong Yi (钟毅), a graduate of Harbin Institute of Technology, in Yan'an. Zhong served as a military commander in the 1960s, but retired early due to poor health. They had four daughters. She was forced to give away her newborn second daughter in 1943, when she was under investigation during the Rectification Movement. After 1949, Chen spent decades searching for the daughter, until they were finally reunited in 1975.

== Death ==
On 12 May 2011, Chen Muhua died of an illness in Beijing, aged 90. General Secretary Hu Jintao and all the members of the Politburo Standing Committee attended her funeral. She was eulogized as an "excellent party member, a long-tested fighter of the Communist cause, a proletarian revolutionary, an outstanding leader in the realm of economic affairs and women and children affairs." She was buried at the Babaoshan Revolutionary Cemetery.
