= Wang Zhongfu =

Chinese politician

- 王众孚

Director of the State Administration for Industry and Commerce
- In office October 1994 – October 2006
- Premier: Li Peng; Zhu Rongji; Wen Jiabao
- Preceded by: Liu Minxue
- Succeeded by: Zhou Bohua

Personal details
- Born: October 1941 (age 84–85) Anhua County, Hunan, China
- Party: Chinese Communist Party
- Education: Central South University

Chinese name
- Simplified Chinese: 王众孚
- Traditional Chinese: 王眾孚
Transcriptions
Standard Mandarin
- Hanyu Pinyin: Wáng Zhòngfú

Wang Zhongfu (Chinese: 王众孚; born October 1941) is a Chinese politician who served as director of the State Administration for Industry and Commerce from 1994 to 2006.

He was a member of the 15th CCP Central Commission for Discipline Inspection and a member of the 16th Central Committee of the Chinese Communist Party. He was a member of the Standing Committee of the 11th Chinese People's Political Consultative Conference.

== Biography ==
Wang was born in Anhua County, Hunan, in October 1941. In 1959, he was admitted to Changsha Railway University (now Central South University), majoring in bridges and tunnels. After graduation in 1964. he enlisted in the People's Liberation Army (PLA), becoming a technician. He joined the Chinese Communist Party (CCP) in February 1968. In November 1972, he was assigned as an official to Hunan Mechanized Construction Company and worked for seven years.

He became a procurator at the Southern District Procuratorate in Changsha in November 1979 and seven months later he joined Changsha Construction Engineering Bureau as an engineer. He was elevated to its director in May 1983. He served as deputy party secretary of Changsha in July 1984, and one year later promoted to the party secretary position.

He was appointed executive vice mayor of Shenzhen in December 1990, concurrently serving as deputy party secretary since December 1992.

In October 1994, he was promoted to director of the State Administration for Industry and Commerce, a position he held until October 2006.

In March 2008, he was made vice chairperson of the Economic Committee of the Chinese People's Political Consultative Conference. On 26 June 2008, he was proposed as the new president of China Consumers' Association.

Party political offices
| Preceded by Zou Naishan | Communist Party Secretary of Changsha; 1985–1990 | Succeeded by Xia Zanzhong |
Government offices
| Preceded by Liu Minxue | Director of the State Administration for Industry and Commerce; 1994–2006 | Succeeded by Zhou Bohua |
