= Wu Guiying =

Chinese politician

- 吴桂英

Communist Party Secretary of Changsha
- Incumbent
- Assumed office 10 February 2021
- Deputy: Zheng Jianxin (mayor)
- Preceded by: Hu Henghua

Personal details
- Born: February 1966 (age 60) Tangshan, Hebei, China
- Party: Chinese Communist Party
- Education: China University of Political Science and Law

Chinese name
- Simplified Chinese: 吴桂英
- Traditional Chinese: 吳桂英
Transcriptions
Standard Mandarin
- Hanyu Pinyin: Wú Guìyīng

Wu Guiying (Chinese: 吴桂英; born February 1966) is a Chinese politician and the current Chinese Communist Party Committee Secretary of Changsha, the top political position in the city.

== Early life and education ==
Wu was born in Tangshan, Hebei, in February 1966. She earned her master's degree in economic law from China University of Political Science and Law in 1990. After university, she was recruited as a legal adviser at a milk company in the southern suburbs of Beijing.

== Career in Beijing ==
Wu joined the Chinese Communist Party in April 1987, and began her political career in April 1991, where she entered the Beijing Administration for Industry and Commerce. She was deputy director of the Beijing Municipal Planning Commission between November 2001 and September 2003 and deputy director of the Beijing Municipal Development and Reform Commission between September 2003 and May 2008. In May 2008, she became the vice governor of Chaoyang District, rising to governor in July 2012. She concurrently served as director of Beijing Central Business District Management Committee from September 2008 to December 2012. In September 2015, she was promoted again to become Chinese Communist Party Committee Secretary, the top political position in the district.

== Career in Hunan ==
In January 2018, she was transferred from her job in Beijing to central Hunan province. She was appointed vice governor of Hunan, heading education, health and medical security work. On 10 February 2021, she was named Chinese Communist Party Committee Secretary of Changsha, her first foray into a provincial capital city leadership role. At the same time, she was admitted to a member of the standing committee of the Hunan Provincial Committee of the Chinese Communist Party, the province's top authority.

Government offices
Preceded by Cheng Lianyuan	Governor of Chaoyang District; 2012–2015	Succeeded by Wang Hao
Party political offices
Preceded by Cheng Lianyuan	Communist Party Secretary of Chaoyang District; 2015–2018	Succeeded by Wang Hao
Preceded by Hu Henghua	Communist Party Secretary of Changsha; 2021–present	Incumbent
