= Committee of Population, Resources and Environment =

Special Committee of the CPPCC National Committee

- 中国人民政治协商会议全国委员会 人口资源环境委员会
- Formation: March 16, 1998; 28 years ago
- Type: Special committee of the CPPCC
- Location: Beijing
- Chairperson: Che Jun
- Parent organization: Chinese People's Political Consultative Conference

Chinese name
- Simplified Chinese: 中国人民政治协商会议全国委员会人口资源环境委员会
- Traditional Chinese: 中國人民政治協商會議全國委員會人口資源環境委員會
Transcriptions
Standard Mandarin
- Hanyu Pinyin: Zhōngguó Rénmín Zhèngzhì Xiéshāng Huìyì Quánguó Wěiyuánhuì Rénkǒu Zīyuán Huánjìng Wěiyuánhuì

Shortest form
- Simplified Chinese: 全国政协人口资源环境委员会
- Traditional Chinese: 全國政協人口資源環境委員會
Transcriptions
Standard Mandarin
- Hanyu Pinyin: Quánguó Zhèngxié Rénkǒu Zīyuán Huánjìng Wěiyuánhuì

The Committee of Population, Resources and Environment is one of ten special committees of the National Committee of the Chinese People's Political Consultative Conference, China's top political advisory body and a central part of the Chinese Communist Party's united front system.

== History ==
The Population, Resources and Environment Committee was created in March 1998 during the 8th National Committee of the Chinese People's Political Consultative Conference.

== List of chairpersons ==
No.	Chairpersons	Took office	Left office	Notes
9th	Hou Jie	16 March 1998	15 March 2003	
10th	Chen Bangzhu	15 March 2003	15 March 2008	
11th	Zhang Weiqing	15 March 2008	13 March 2013	
12th	Jia Zhibang	13 March 2013	16 March 2018	
13th	Li Wei	16 March 2018	13 March 2023	
14th	Che Jun	13 March 2023	Incumbent	

== See also ==
- Environmental Protection and Resources Conservation Committee
