= Yang Baohua =

Chinese politician

- 阳宝华

Vice-Chairman of Hunan People's Political Consultative Conference
- In office January 2003 – 2011

Communist Party Secretary of Changsha
- In office February 1998 – January 2003
- Preceded by: Qin Guangrong
- Succeeded by: Zhang Yunchuan

Communist Party Secretary of Yueyang
- In office April 1995 – January 1998

Mayor of Yiyang
- In office June 1994 – April 1995
- Preceded by: New position
- Succeeded by: Li Jiang

Personal details
- Born: September 1947 (age 79) Hengshan County, Hunan
- Party: Chinese Communist Party (expelled)
- Education: Central Party School of the Chinese Communist Party
- Occupation: Politician

Chinese name
- Traditional Chinese: 陽寶華
- Simplified Chinese: 阳宝华
Transcriptions
Standard Mandarin
- Hanyu Pinyin: Yáng Bǎohuá

Yang Baohua (Chinese: 阳宝华; born September 1947) is a former Chinese politician from Hunan province. He served successively as the party chief of Yueyang, party chief of Changsha, and vice-chairman of Hunan People's Political Consultative Conference. He underwent investigation for corruption in 2014.

== Biography ==
Yang was born in a village in Hengshan County, Hunan province, prior to the founding of the People's Republic of China. During the Cultural Revolution, Yang attended the No.1 Hengdong High School.

He became joined the workforce in December 1968 and joined the Chinese Communist Party in August 1972.

From 1968 to 1983, Yang worked as a local officer in Hengyang.

He entered Central Party School of the Chinese Communist Party in September 1983, where he graduated in August 1985. After graduation, he was appointed as the Vice-Mayor of Hengyang, a position he held until November 1991, when he was transferred to Yiyang and appointed the deputy party chief.

He served as the party chief of Yueyang between April 1995 to January 1998.

In February 1998, he was promoted to become the Communist Party Secretary of Changsha, capital of Hunan province.

In January 2003, he was elevated to the vice-chairman of Hunan People's Political Consultative Conference.

On May 26, 2014, it was announced that Yang was under investigation by the Central Commission for Discipline Inspection for "serious violations of laws and regulations". The CCDI investigation concluded that Yang had taken bribes, abused his power, and "committed adultery." His case was taken up by the Guilin Intermediate People's Court in Guangxi. The court found that Yang took 13.56 million yuan (~$2.13 million) in bribes personally or through his wife, son, and brother-in-law.

On November 3, 2015, Yang Baohua was sentenced to 11 years in jail for taking bribes.

Government offices
Previous: New position	Mayor of Yiyang; 1994-1995	Next: Li Jiang (李江)
Party political offices
Previous: Luo Guiqiu (罗桂求)	Communist Party Secretary of Yueyang; 1995-1998	Next: Zhang Changping (张昌平)
Previous: Qin Guangrong	Communist Party Secretary of Changsha; 1998-2003	Next: Zhang Yunchuan
