= Wang Hanbin =

Chinese politician (born 1925)

- 王汉斌

Vice Chairman of the Standing Committee of the National People's Congress
- In office 8 April 1988 – 16 March 1998
- Chairman: Wan Li; Qiao Shi

Personal details
- Born: 28 August 1925 (age 101) Yangon, Burma
- Party: Chinese Communist Party
- Spouse: Peng Peiyun
- Occupation: Politician

Wang Hanbin (born 28 August 1925) is a retired Chinese Communist Party politician.

== Life and career ==
Wang was born in Yangon, Burma on 28 August 1925; his ancestral home is Hui'an, Fujian Province. He joined the Chinese Communist Party in 1941. He graduated from the Southwest Union University in 1946.

After the People's Republic of China was formed in 1949, he served as secretary of the CCP Beijing Municipal Committee until 1958 when he became the deputy secretary general of the Municipal Committee. He became the director of the Policy Research Office of the Chinese Academy of Sciences from 1977 to 1979. He was a member of the 12th, 13th, and 14th CCP Central Committees from 1982 to 1997 and an alternate member of 14th Politburo of the Chinese Communist Party of the CPC between 1992 and 1997. He was also the Secretary-General of the 6th National People's Congress Standing Committee (NPCSC) and became the vice-chairman of the 7th and 8th NPCSC.

During the draftings of the Hong Kong Basic Law for the Hong Kong Special Administrative Region, he was selected vice-chairman of the Hong Kong Basic Law Drafting Committee.
