= Huawei Symantec =

Huawei Symantec Technologies Co. Ltd.
- Native name: 华为赛门铁克科技有限公司
- Company type: Joint venture
- Industry: Information technology
- Founded: February 2008; 17 years ago
- Founder: Huawei; Symantec
- Defunct: March 2012
- Fate: Symantec's stake acquired by Huawei
- Headquarters: Chengdu, China
- Key people: John W. Thompson (Chairman); Ren Zhengfei (CEO); Tad Lebeck (CTO)
- Products: Network security, storage and computing solutions
- Owners: Huawei (51%); Symantec (49%)
- Parent: Huawei; Symantec
- Website: www.huaweisymantec.com

Huawei Symantec Technologies Co., Ltd. (Chinese: 华为赛门铁克科技有限公司; pinyin: Huáwéi Sàiméntiěkè Kējì Yǒuxiàn Gōngsī) was a developer, producer and supplier of network security, storage and computing solutions

The joint venture, owned 51% by Huawei and 49% by Symantec, was headquartered in Chengdu, China.

== History ==
- 2000: Huawei started R&D in the security technology field; Symantec is a provider of antivirus and security software
- 2004: Huawei started R&D in storage technology field
- 2005: Symantec acquires Veritas Software, manufacturer of information lifecycle management software
- 2007 (May): Huawei and Symantec sign an agreement for the establishment of a joint venture in order to provide end-to-end solutions in the domain of converging network, security, and storage and computing technologies.
- 2008 (February): Huawei Symantec was established.
- 2012 (March): Huawei acquires the 49% of shares held by the Symantec Corporation at a price of about 530 million U.S. dollars or 3.4 billion yuan.

== Technological convergence and R&D ==
Huawei Symantec is a holder of more than 300 patents in storage and network security field, and about 30 of them were accepted as formal technological standards. Huawei Symantec's technologists participate in various standardization organizations, including holding chair and vice-chair posts. More than 50% of employees are engaged in research and development activities with labs located in Beijing, Shenzhen, Hangzhou in China, and in India.

== Acquisition by Huawei ==
On November 14, 2011, Beijing Time, Huawei and Symantec reached an agreement on a transaction where Huawei acquired Symantec's 49% stake in Huawei Symantec Technologies Co., Ltd. (Huawei Symantec) for US$530 million. Upon closing the agreement gave Huawei full ownership of Huawei Symantec. Huawei Symantec and Symantec Corporation are two separate entities.
