= The Global Institute for Tomorrow =

- Abbreviation: GIFT
- Formation: 2006
- Type: Social Policy Think Tank
- Headquarters: 1111 King’s Road Tai Koo
- Location: Hong Kong
- Founder: Chandran Nair
- Website: http://www.global-inst.com

The Global Institute For Tomorrow (GIFT) is a Hong Kong–based think tank focusing on economic, political and social issues from an Asian perspective. Founded in 2006 by Chandran Nair, its stated mission is to advance “a deeper understanding of global issues including the shift of economic and political influence from the West to Asia, the dynamic relationship between business and society, the role of the state and the reshaping of the rules of global capitalism.” GIFT opened an office in Kuala Lumpur, Malaysia in 2016.

GIFT's Global Advisory Council includes David Eldon of HSBC, Professor Hideaki Takahashi of Keoi University, Sanjeev Gandhi of BASF, Priti Devi, and Sandiaga Uno of Saratoga Capital.

== Executive Education ==
Since its inception, GIFT has run an executive education programme named the Global Leaders Programme (GLP). The GLP brings business leaders into the field to help solve problems provided by social enterprises, NGOs and local governments and encourage the creation of socially directed and financially viable business models, designed to improve participants’ ability to lead in a changing and globalized world. GIFT's leadership programme was presented by Ashridge Business School at the UN Rio+20 conference. GIFT has conducted programmes in 13 countries in Asia, including Cambodia, Malaysia, Myanmar and Vietnam with over 2000 participants over the years.

Notable past partners include:

- The World Bank
- The United Nations Development Programme
- The Economic and Social Commission for Asia and the Pacific
- The International Fund for Agricultural Development
- The Hong Kong Jockey Club
- Yoma Bank
- International Development Enterprises
- the International Rice Research Institute
- East Meets West
- The Municipal Government of Jakarta

== The Other Hundred ==
GIFT supervises the publication of The Other Hundred, a series of photostory books with the stated aim of introducing "readers to the vast majority of people, ideas, places and cultures overlooked by most major media publications." One hundred photos and stories are selected for publication. Three editions have been published thus far: The Other Hundred (2013) and The Other Hundred Entrepreneurs (2015) and The Other Hundred Educators (2016).

== See also ==
- List of think tanks in Hong Kong
