= Chongqing Jianzhu University =

- 重庆建筑大学
- Motto: 耐劳苦、尚俭朴、勤学业、爱国家
- Type: National
- Established: 1952
- President: Zhu Jialin
- Academic staff: 2,072
- Students: 14,365
- Undergraduates: 7,991
- Postgraduates: 1,091
- Location: Chongqing, People's Republic of China
- Campus: Suburban, 37.2 hectares
- Website: cqjzu.edu.cn at the Wayback Machine (archive index)

Chongqing Jianzhu University
- Simplified Chinese: 重庆建筑大学
- Traditional Chinese: 重慶建築大學
- Literal meaning: Chongqing Construction University
Transcriptions
Standard Mandarin
- Hanyu Pinyin: Chóngqìng Jiànzhù Dàxué

Chongqing Jianzhu University was a university in Chongqing, People's Republic of China, from 1952 to 2000. On May 31, 2000, it merged with Chongqing University to form a higher-level 985 engineering school.

== Alumni ==
Chongqing University had many notable alumni including:

- Ren Zhengfei, Founder and President of Huawei
