= Politics of Changsha =

The Politics of Changsha in Hunan province in the People's Republic of China is structured in a dual party-government system like all other governing institutions in mainland China. Changsha Municipal Government today is deeply influenced by its long past. Changsha's political system reflects the two major influences on the historical development of China: on the one hand, its legacy as an over 2,000 years feudal system region, and on the other, the powerful influence exerted by China's neighbor to the north, the Soviet Union.

The Mayor of Changsha is the highest-ranking official in the People's Government of Changsha or Changsha Municipal Government. However, in the city's dual party-government governing system, the Mayor has less power than the Communist Party of Changsha Municipal Committee Secretary, colloquially termed the "CPC Party Chief of Changsha" or "Communist Party Secretary of Changsha".

== Introduction ==
As a city of the Communist State, Changsha's system of government was based on the Soviet Union system of one party dictatorship. This is referred to as "Soviet Union-style" democracy.

Changsha is governed by a democratically elected People's Congress, which corresponds to the parliament of democratic country. The Head of the Changsha Municipal Government is the Mayor. The Mayor's agreement is required for an Act of Changsha People's Congress to become law. The People's Congress has a number of different functions, first and foremost, it scrutinise the execution of constitution, laws, regulations in the city. Another important function is to debate the major issues of the city. Its other roles are provided the means of carrying on the work of government by voting for leaders, including chairmen and vice-chairman of the People's Congress, mayor, deputy mayor, president of the municipal court and president of the municipal procuratorate.

== History ==
The Changsha Municipal People's Government was established in 1949 replacing the Changsha Municipal Government of the Republic of China.

On March 18, 2019, Vice-Mayor Li Xiaohong (Chinese: 李晓宏) has been placed under investigation by the Central Commission for Discipline Inspection (CCDI), the party's internal disciplinary body, and the National Supervisory Commission, the highest anti-corruption agency of China.

== List of mayors of Changsha ==
=== Republic of China ===
No.	English name	Chinese name	Took office	Left office	Notes
1	Zhu Jianfan	朱剑凡	1 May 1927	8 May 1927	
2	He Yuanwen	何元文	1 October 1933	Spring of 1937	
3	Chun Lin	楚霖	August 1938	October 1943	
4	Wang Bingchen	王秉丞	21 October 1943	September 1945	
5	Li Yujiu	李毓九	9 September 1945	May 1946	
6	Wang Hao	汪浩	1 May 1946	31 January 1948	
7	Jiang Kun	蒋昆	31 January 1948	23 March 1949	
8	Chen Jieshi	陈介石	30 March 1949	August 1949	

=== People's Republic of China ===
No.	English name	Chinese name	Took office	Left office	Notes
1	Xiao Jingguang	萧劲光	19 August 1949	22 August 1949	
2	Yan Zixiang	阎子祥	22 August 1949	30 January 1953	
3	Shang Zijin	尚子锦	30 January 1953	July 1954	
4	Cao Chi	曹痴	28 March 1955	3 March 1960	
5	Wang Qunwu	王群伍	3 March 1960	18 February 1968	
6	Zhang Ji	张骥	28 February 1968	March 1970	Director of Revolutionary Committee
7	Qi Shouliang	齐寿良	October 1975	November 1977	
8	Shi Xinshan	石新山	November 1977	25 June 1981	
9	Li Zhaomin	李照民	25 June 1981	23 February 1982	
10	Xiong Qingquan	熊清泉	23 February 1982	21 December 1982	
11	Qi Zhenying	齐振瑛	21 December 1982	10 September 1985	
12	Wang Keying	王克英	10 September 1985	13 April 1991	
13	Zhang Mingtai	张明泰	13 April 1991	6 October 1994	
14	Yuan Hankun	袁汉坤	6 October 1994	3 January 1998	
15	Du Mingyuan	杜远明	3 January 1998	16 October 1999	
16	Tan Zhongchi	谭仲池	16 October 1999	21 November 2007	
17	Zhang Jianfei	张剑飞	21 November 2007	19 December 2013	
18	Hu Henghua	胡衡华	19 December 2013	February 2018	
19	Hu Zhongxiong	胡忠雄	30 March 2018	February 2020	
20	Zheng Jianxin	郑建新	February 2020	May 2023	
21	Zhou Haibing	周海兵	June 2023	May 2025	
22	Chen Bozhang	陈博彰	May 2025	current	

== List of CPC Party secretaries of Changsha ==
=== Republic of China ===
No.	English name	Chinese name	Took office	Left office	Notes
1	Chen Youkui	陈佑魁	1923	1924	
2	Xia Minghan	夏明翰	1924	1927	
3	Li Yanong	李亚农	1926	1926	
4	Chen Jingsheng	陈竞生	1926	1927	
5	Peng Gongda	彭公达	1927	1927	
6	Tu Zhengchun	涂正楚	October 1927	19 December 1927	
7	Ren Zuomin	任作民	January 1938	1938	
8	Zhou Hongmin	周宏明	1938	May 1938	
9	Ren Zuomin	任作民	May 1938	1938	
10	Song Lian	宋濂	1938	1938	
11	Mao Daxun	毛达恂	1938	November 1938	
12	Mao Daxun	毛达恂	November 1938	1945	
13	Xie Jiemei	谢介眉	November 1945	July 1946	
14	Zhou Li	周礼	July 1946	Spring of 1948	
15	Shen Liren	沈立人	Spring of 1948	January 1949	

=== People's Republic of China ===
No.	English name	Chinese name	Took office	Left office	Notes
1	Shen Liren	沈立人	January 1949	April 1949	
2	Zhou Li	周礼	April 1949	June 1949	
3	Shen Liren	沈立人	June 1949	25 August 1949	
4	Cao Ying	曹瑛	25 August 1949	March 1954	
5	Zeng Zhi	曾直	16 January 1953	June 1954	
6	Qin Yuping	秦雨屏	June 1954	1955	
7	Cao Chi	曹痴	1955	April 1957	
8	Li Ruishan	李瑞山	April 1957	August 1966	
9	Sun Yunying	孙云英	August 1966	November 1968	
10	Ding Jian	丁健	November 1968	June 1970	
11	Jing Lin	景林	June 1970	1971	
12	Yu Mingtao	于明涛	1971	October 1975	
13	Qi Shouliang	齐寿良	October 1975	November 1977	
14	Shi Xinshan	石新山	November 1977	March 1982	
15	Liu Fusheng	刘夫生	February 1982	March 1983	
16	Zou Naishan	邹乃山	March 1983	April 1986	
17	Wang Zhongfu	王众孚	June 1985	December 1990	
18	Xia Zanzhong	夏赞忠	December 1990	April 1993	
19	Qin Guangrong	秦光荣	June 1993	February 1998	
20	Yang Baohua	阳宝华	February 1998	October 1999	
21	Zhang Yunchuan	张云川	October 1999	August 2001	
22	Mei Kebao	梅克保	August 2001	November 2006	
23	Chen Run'er	陈润儿	November 2006	April 2013	
24	Yi Lianhong	易炼红	May 2013	July 2017	
25	Hu Henghua	胡衡华	July 2017	October 2020	
26	Wu Guiying	吴桂英	February 2021	June 2026	
26	Chen Jing	陈竞	June 2026	current	
