= Politics of Yueyang =

The Politics of Yueyang in Hunan province in the People's Republic of China is structured in a dual party-government system like all other governing institutions in mainland China.

The Mayor of Yueyang is the highest-ranking official in the People's Government of Yueyang or Yueyang Municipal Government. However, in the city's dual party-government governing system, the Mayor has less power than the Communist Party of Yueyang Municipal Committee Secretary, colloquially termed the "CPC Party Chief of Yueyang" or "Communist Party Secretary of Yueyang".

== History ==
On May 26, 2014, Yang Baohua was put under investigation by the Central Commission for Discipline Inspection (CCDI) for "serious violations of laws and regulations".

On April 21, 2020, the current Party chief Liu Hesheng was put under investigation for alleged "serious violations of discipline and laws" by the Central Commission for Discipline Inspection (CCDI), the party's internal disciplinary body, and the National Supervisory Commission, the highest anti-corruption agency in China.

== List of mayors of Yueyang ==
| No. | English name | Chinese name | Took office | Left office | Notes |
|---|---|---|---|---|---|
| 1 | Chen Bangzhu | 陈邦柱 | August 1983 | September 1984 | |
| 2 | Tan Zhaohua | 谭照华 | February 1986 | August 1990 | |
| 3 | Ouyang Song | 欧阳松 | August 1990 | September 1994 | |
| 4 | Huang Jiaxi | 黄甲喜 | September 1994 | December 1997 | |
| 5 | Zhou Changgong | 周昌贡 | December 1997 | January 2000 | |
| 6 | Luo Bisheng | 罗碧升 | January 2000 | March 2000 | Acting |
| 7 | Luo Bisheng | 罗碧升 | March 2000 | September 2006 | |
| 8 | Huang Lanxiang | 黄兰香 | September 2006 | January 2007 | Acting |
| 9 | Huang Lanxiang | 黄兰香 | January 2007 | December 2011 | |
| 10 | Sheng Ronghua | 盛荣华 | December 2011 | January 2012 | Acting |
| 11 | Sheng Ronghua | 盛荣华 | January 2012 | June 2015 | |
| 12 | Liu Hesheng | 刘和生 | July 2015 | February 2018 | |
| 13 | Li Aiwu | 李爱武 | February 2018 | | |

== List of CPC Party secretaries of Yueyang ==
| No. | English name | Chinese name | Took office | Left office | Notes |
|---|---|---|---|---|---|
| 1 | Zhan Shunchu | 詹顺初 | August 1983 | February 1986 | |
| 2 | Chu Bo | 储波 | February 1986 | March 1991 | |
| 3 | Xie Peiqing | 谢培清 | March 1991 | October 1993 | |
| 4 | Luo Guiqiu | 罗桂求 | October 1993 | April 1995 | |
| 5 | Yang Baohua | 阳宝华 | April 1995 | February 1998 | |
| 6 | Zhang Changping | 张昌平 | February 1998 | January 2000 | |
| 7 | Yu Laishan | 于来山 | January 2000 | April 2004 | |
| 8 | Yi Lianhong | 易炼红 | May 2004 | December 2011 | |
| 9 | Huang Lanxiang | 黄兰香 | December 2011 | March 2013 | |
| 10 | Qing Jianwei | 卿渐伟 | March 2013 | December 2016 | |
| 11 | Hu Zhongxiong | 胡忠雄 | December 2016 | January 2018 | |
| 12 | Liu Hesheng | 刘和生 | February 2018 | December 2019 | |
| 13 | Wang Yi'ou | 王一鸥 | December 2019 | | |
