= National Population and Family Planning Commission =

Government agency of China

- 中华人民共和国国家人口和计划生育委员会

Agency overview
- Formed: 1981
- Dissolved: March 2013
- Superseding agency: National Health and Family Planning Commission
- Type: Constituent Department of the State Council (cabinet-level executive department)
- Jurisdiction: China
- Headquarters: Beijing
- Minister responsible: Minister in charge of the National (Population and) Family Planning Commission
- Parent agency: State Council
- Website: www.chinapop.gov.cn

The National Population and Family Planning Commission (NPFPC; 2003–2013), formerly the National Family Planning Commission (NFPC; 1981–2003), was a cabinet-level executive department under the State Council, responsible for population and family planning policy in the People's Republic of China. The commission was dissolved and superseded by the National Health and Family Planning Commission in March 2013, during the first session of the 12th National People's Congress.

The agency was managed by a minister and four vice ministers.

== List of ministers ==
Minister in charge of the National (Population and) Family Planning Commission
No.	Name	Took office	Left office
1	Chen Muhua	March 1981	April 1982
2	Qian Xinzhong	April 1982	December 1983
3	Wang Wei (王伟)	December 1983	January 1988
4	Peng Peiyun	January 1988	March 1998
5	Zhang Weiqing (张维庆)	March 1998	March 2008
6	Li Bin	March 2008	December 2011
7	Wang Xia (王侠)	December 2011	16 March 2013

== See also ==
- Family planning policy of Mainland China
  - One-child policy
- Ministry of Health of the People's Republic of China
