= Shanghai Open University =

University in Shanghai, China

- 上海开放大学
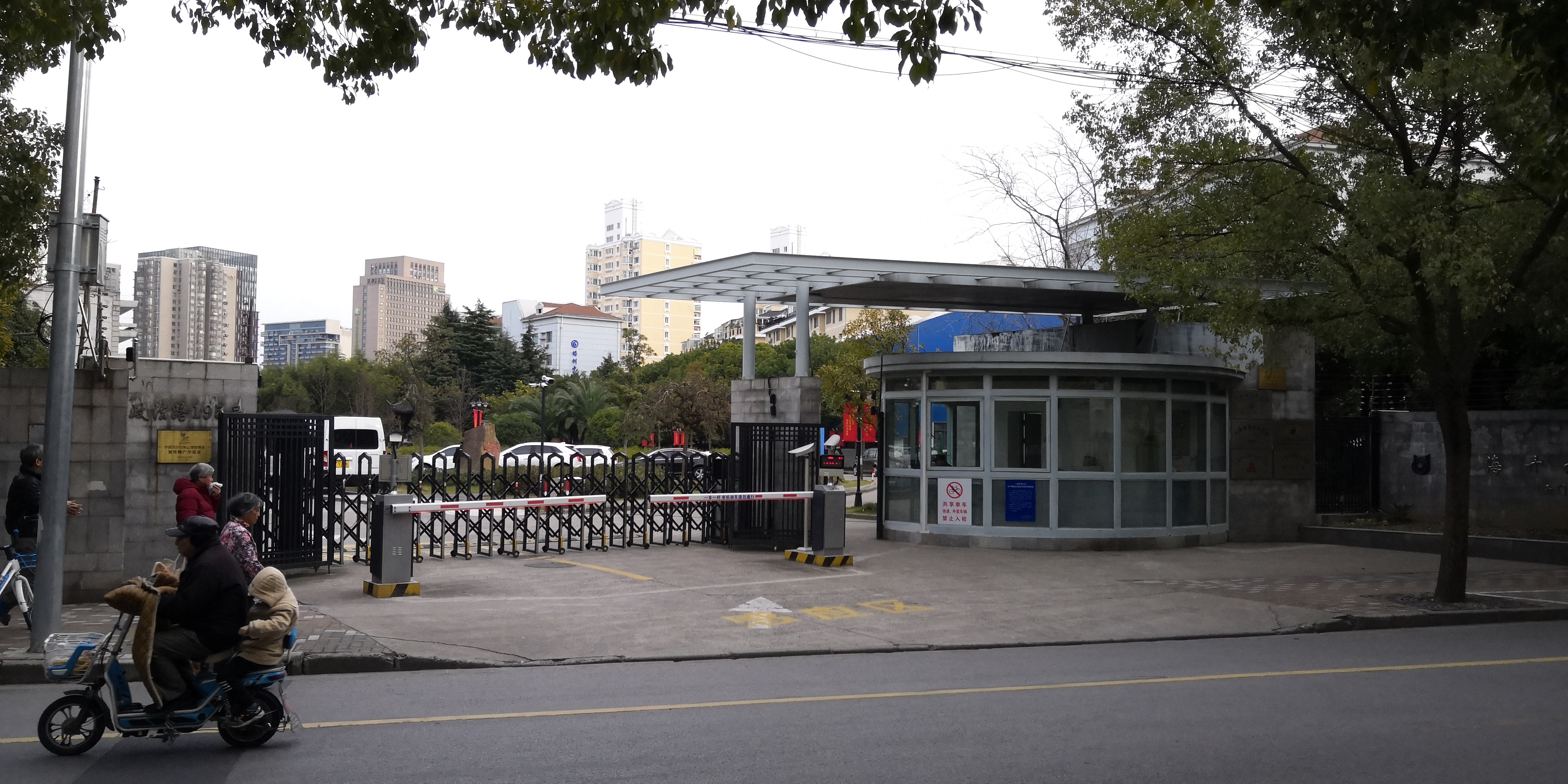
- Side gate (former main gate) of Shanghai Open University Guoshun Road Campus on Zhenfa Road
- Former names: Shanghai TV University
- Type: Public
- Established: 1960
- Affiliations: Asian Association of Open Universities
- President: Jiang Hong
- Students: >100,000
- Location: Shanghai, China
- Website: www.sou.edu.cn

Shanghai Open University
- Simplified Chinese: 上海开放大学
- Traditional Chinese: 上海開放大學
Transcriptions
Standard Mandarin
- Hanyu Pinyin: Shànghǎi Kāifàng Dàxué

Shanghai Open University (Chinese: 上海开放大学), formerly known as Shanghai Television University (Chinese: 上海电视大学), is an open university conducting distance education based on telecommunication, broadcasting and television, and computer and other technology based subject courses.

On July 25, 2012, the university officially changed its name to Shanghai Open University, and now offers Associate and bachelor's degrees. Bachelor's degrees offered now include Public Safety Management, Mechanical Electrical Engineering, and Software Engineering. Admissions is open, though conferring of degrees is based on met requirements.

== History ==
The university was founded on 1960 as Shanghai TV University (SHTVU) "offering undergraduate education for adults."

While reports that during its early years the university functioned "simply [to] keep[] unemployed workers busy," and its diplomas were only "equal in status to those of a two-year college." By the mid-1960s the university had enrolled over 50,000 students but graduated only 12,000. Epstein regards this dysfunction as a typical example of policies in Chinese urban areas in the 1960s which "attempted to placate immediate political demands" but "proved to be counterproductive to long-term educational aims."

According to the Xinhua General Overseas News Service, from 1991 to 1993 the university added eight economic courses to its curriculum including industrial and commercial business management, auditing, and finance.

In 2003, student enrollment amounts to 100,000. By 2012 Shanghai TV University was renamed as Shanghai Open University with the approval of the Ministry of Education of China.
