= Ma Yong =

Chinese politician

- 马勇

Communist Party Secretary of Yiyang
- In office March 2008 – April 2013
- Preceded by: Jiang Zuobin
- Succeeded by: Wei Xuanjun

Mayor of Yiyang
- In office September 2006 – March 2008
- Preceded by: Liu Guoxiang
- Succeeded by: Hu Henghua

Personal details
- Born: January 1957 (age 69) Chongqing, China
- Party: Chinese Communist Party (1984–2016; expelled)
- Education: Hunan Agricultural University

Ma Yong (simplified Chinese: 马勇; traditional Chinese: 馬勇; pinyin: Mǎ Yǒng; born January 1957) is a former Chinese politician who spent most of his career in central China's Hunan province. He was investigated by the Chinese Communist Party's anti-graft agency in May 2015 and was taken away by Hunan Provincial People's Procuratorate for accepting bribes and abuse of power. Previously he served as deputy secretary-general of Hunan.

== Life and career ==
Ma Yong was born in Chongqing in January 1957. During the Cultural Revolution, he worked in Longhui County between May 1975 to December 1977. He entered Hunan Agricultural University in March 1978, majoring in agriculture, where he graduated in January 1982. He began his political career in January 1982, and joined the Chinese Communist Party in January 1984.

Beginning in July 1984, he served in various administrative and political roles in Hunan Statistic Bureau, including section member, section chief, and director.

In September 2006 he was promoted to become deputy party boss, vice-mayor and party branch secretary of Yiyang city, and then party boss, the top political position in the city, beginning in March 2008.

In April 2013, he was appointed deputy secretary-general of the Hunan Party Committee, a position he held until September 2015, when he taken away by Hunan Provincial People's Procuratorate on charges of abuse of power and taking bribes. He was detained by Hunan Provincial People's Procuratorate on September 30.

On January 29, 2016, he was indicted on suspicion of accepting bribes and abusing his powers. On March 29, he stood trial at the Intermediate People's Court of Chenzhou. On August 3, he was expelled from the Chinese Communist Party (CCP) and dismissed from public office. On August 19, he was sentenced to 12 years and fined one million yuan for taking bribes and abusing his powers. All his illegal gains will be confiscated and handed over to the State. On June 8, 2019, he was given five months' remission for good behaviour.

Government offices
| Preceded by Liu Guoxiang | Mayor of Yiyang; 2006–2008 | Succeeded by Hu Henghua |
Party political offices
| Preceded by Jiang Zuobin (蒋作斌) | Communist Party Secretary of Yiyang; 2008–2013 | Succeeded by Wei Xuanjun (魏旋君) |
