= Chandran Nair (businessman) =

Author, entrepreneur, think tank founder

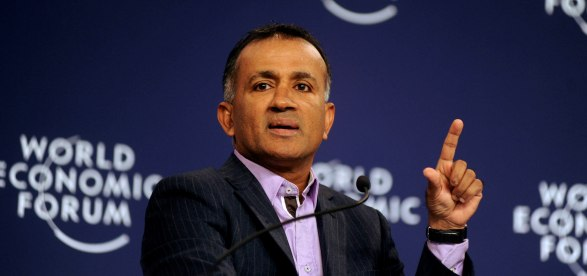
Chandran Nair at the World Economic Forum at Davos 2012

Chandran Nair is the founder of the Global Institute For Tomorrow (GIFT), a pan-Asian think tank he established in 2004 to advance a deeper understanding of global economic, political and social shifts, with offices in Hong Kong and Kuala Lumpur, Malaysia, and a presence in the Middle East. Described by the World Economic Forum as a thought leader whose views are sought at major international gatherings, Nair is known for his work on sustainable development and the reshaping of global capitalism. He is the author of several books, including Consumptionomics: Asia's Role in Reshaping Capitalism and Saving the Planet, which was included in The Guardian's list of 50 breakthrough capitalism books.

== Background ==
Nair was born in Malaysia, the seventh of eight children. His parents were immigrants to Malaysia from India, and not well off, with all the children sharing a room. He studied chemical engineering in the UK, where he then worked for a few years. At 28, he joined the anti-apartheid movement in South Africa, building sanitation and water systems by day on a stipend and playing the saxophone in his free time in a band. He later earned a master's degree in environmental engineering from Bangkok.

== Career ==
Nair is a member of the World Economic Forum Global Agenda Council for Sustainability and has argued at numerous forums including the WEF, APEC and OECD about the need for radical reform of the current economic model and strict limits on consumption. Nair was previously Chairman of Environmental Resources Management (ERM), building the company to be the leading environmental consultancy in Asia Pacific. He left in March 2004.

Nair is a frequent contributor to various media outlets including The Financial Times, The Guardian, The Huffington Post, The New York Times. and South China Morning Post. He is the author of Consumptionomics: Asia's role in reshaping capitalism and saving the planet, named one of the top ten books of 2011 by The Globalist. In 2018 he published The Sustainable State: The Future of Government, Economy, and Society.

== Controversy ==
On August 26, 2021, Nair wrote an op-ed in Time magazine accusing Nicole Kidman of using her "White Privilege" to avoid being quarantined when arriving in Hong Kong to film the Amazon Prime Video series Expats. Hong Kong's Commerce and Economic Development Bureau (CEDB) responded in a press statement that Kidman received a quarantine exemption for the purpose of performing designated professional work and necessary operation of Hong Kong's economy, and a CEDB permanent secretary wrote a letter to the editor of Time stating that Nair's claim was "not only just misplaced but absurd".
