= Sun Yafang =

Chinese engineer, chairwoman of Huawei

- 孙亚芳
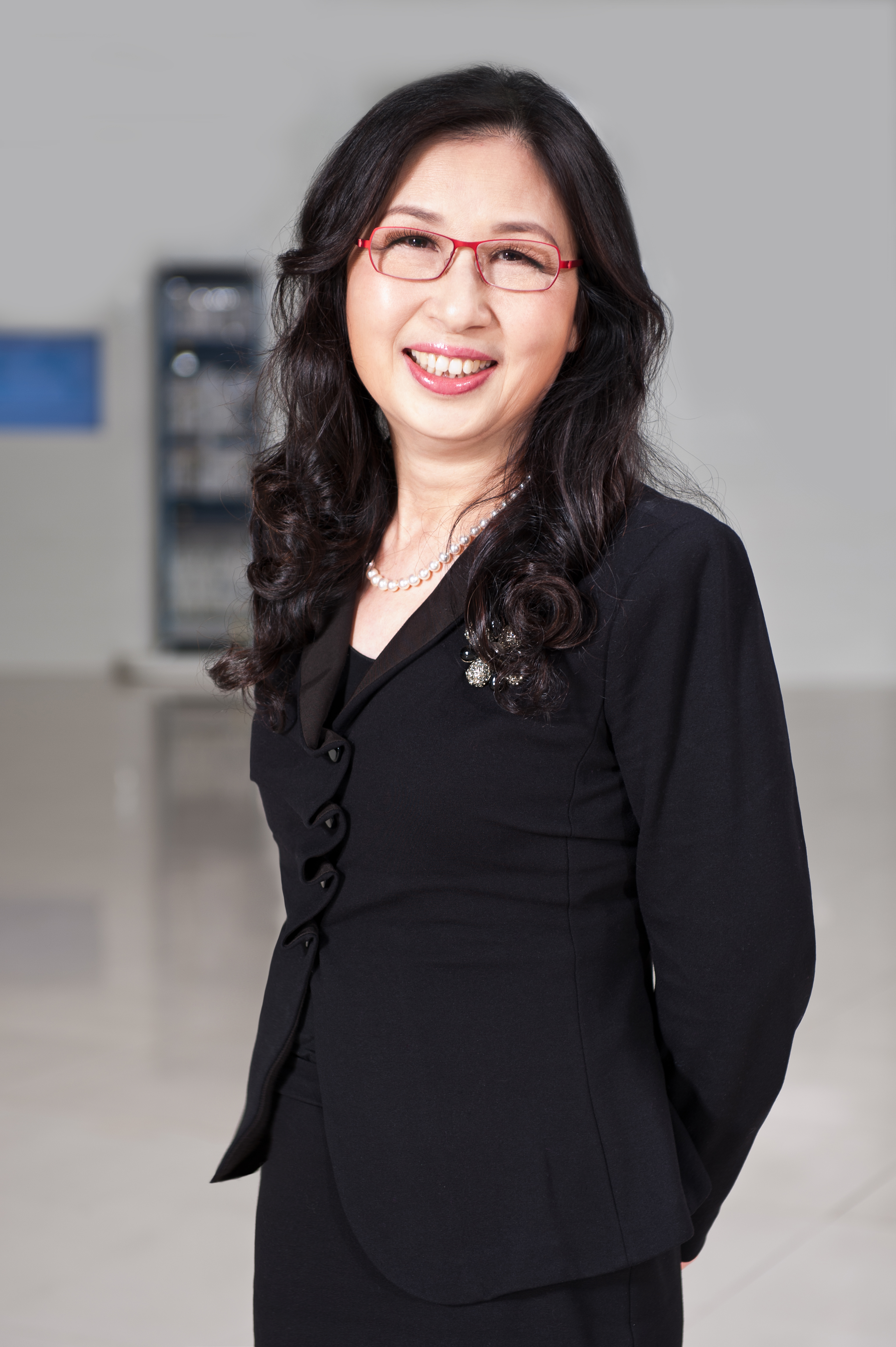
- Sun in 2012
- Born: 1955 (age 70–71); Guizhou, China
- Education: University of Electronic Science and Technology of China (UESTC)
- Occupations: Engineer, business executive
- Employer(s): Huawei; Ministry of State Security
- Political party: Chinese Communist Party

Sun Yafang
- Simplified Chinese: 孙亚芳
- Traditional Chinese: 孫亞芳
Transcriptions
Standard Mandarin
- Hanyu Pinyin: Sūn Yàfāng

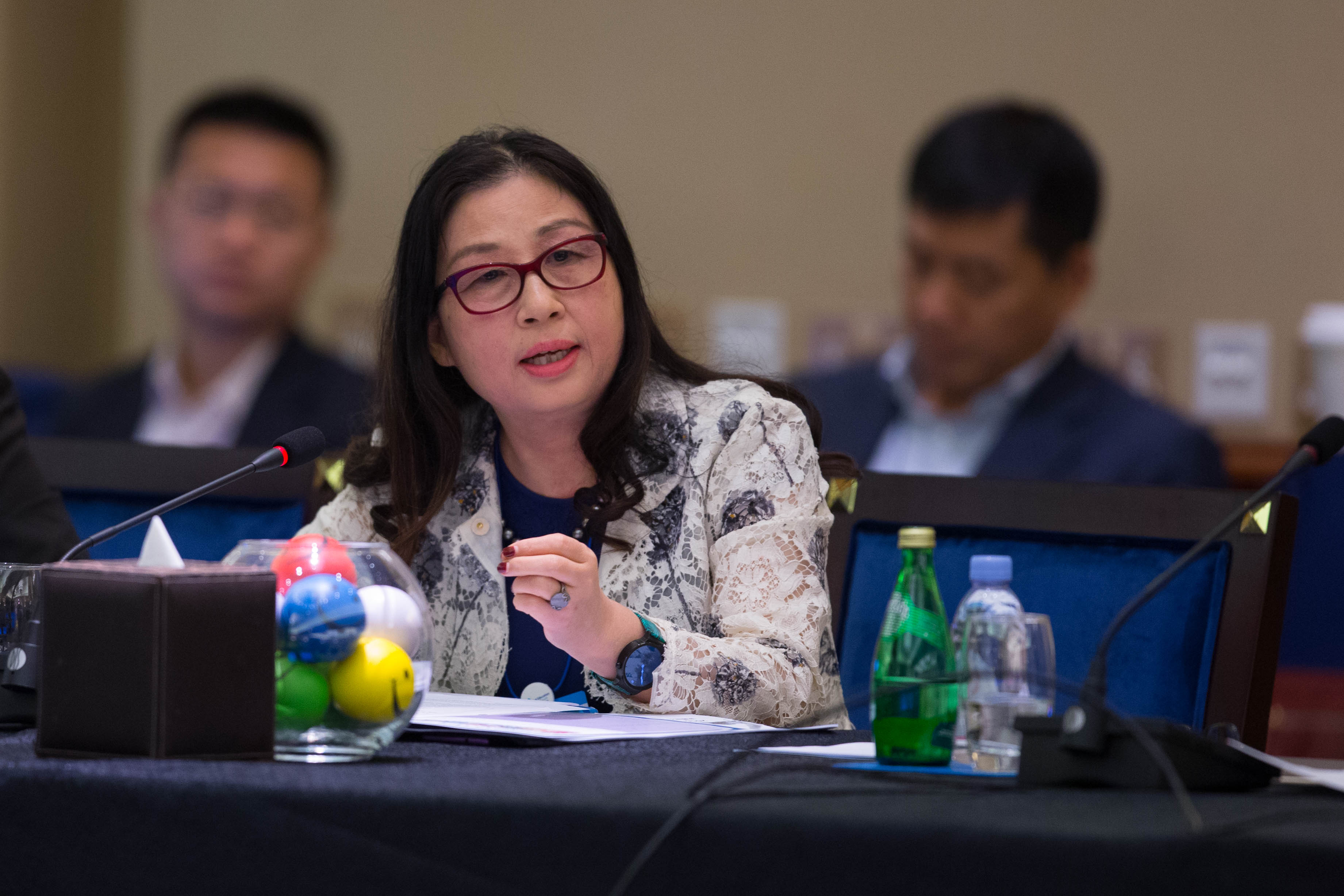
Sun in 2016

Sun Yafang (Chinese: 孙亚芳; born 1955) is a Chinese engineer and business executive. She is the longest serving Chairwoman of Huawei, a position she held from 1999 to 2018. As of 2016, she is listed as the 38th most powerful woman in the world by Forbes.

== Background ==
She earned her bachelor's degree at the University of Electronic Science and Technology of China (UESTC) in 1982. Then, Sun started working as a technician at Xin Fei TV Manufactory. In 1985, she became an engineer at the Beijing Research Institution of Communication Technology. Prior to joining Huawei in 1989, Sun worked for the Ministry of State Security's Communications Department.

She began her career with Huawei in 1989 and became chairwoman of the corporation in 1999.

In March 2018, Huawei switched to a rotating chairman to run the company, continuing Huawei's collective leadership system. Sun Yafang stepped down as Chairwoman of Huawei after nineteen years and was replaced by Liang Hua.

== Awards ==
In May 2012, she received the World Telecommunication and Information Society Award from the International Telecommunication Union. In 2014, she was listed as the 81st most powerful woman in the world by Forbes.

== See also ==
- Meng Wanzhou, Deputy Chairwoman & CFO of Huawei
