= Liang Hua =

Chinese business executive

- 梁华
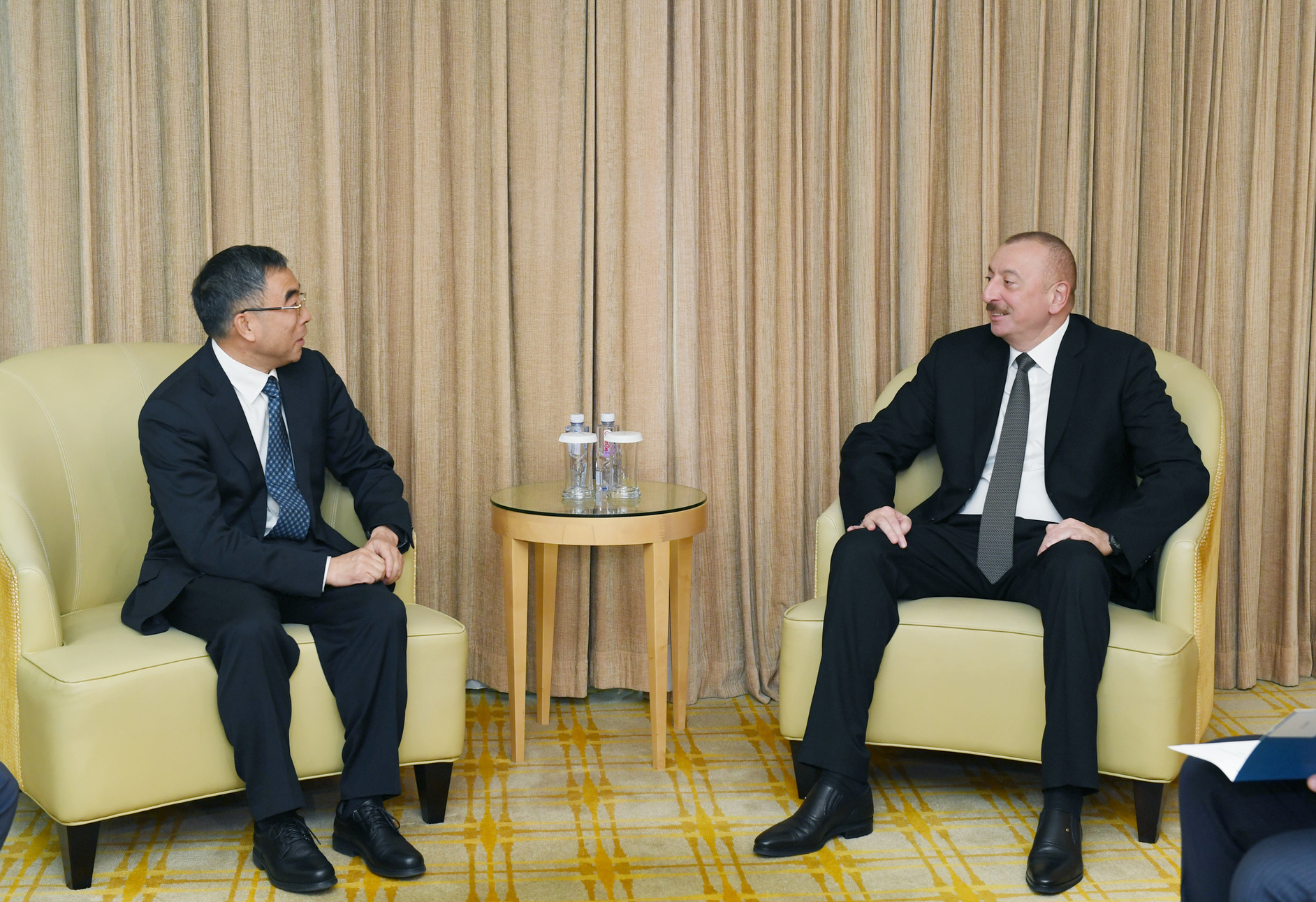
- Liang Hua and Ilham Aliyev in April 2019

Chairman of Huawei
- Incumbent
- Assumed office 22 March 2018
- Preceded by: Sun Yafang

Personal details
- Born: 1964 (age 61–62) Dangyang, Hubei, China
- Party: Chinese Communist Party
- Education: Northwestern Polytechnical University; Wuhan University of Technology

Chinese name
- Traditional Chinese: 梁華
- Simplified Chinese: 梁华
Transcriptions
Standard Mandarin
- Hanyu Pinyin: Liáng Huá

Liang Hua (Chinese: 梁华; born 1964) is a Chinese business executive and the current chairman of Huawei Technologies Co., Ltd.

== Biography ==
Liang was born in 1964 in Banyue Town of Dangyang, Hubei. He secondary studied at Dangyang No. 1 High School. He graduated from Northwestern Polytechnical University.

He joined the Huawei Technologies Co., Ltd. in 1995, where he successively served as president of its logistics and supply-chain management system, president of its process and IT management department, president of its global technology services, director of its audit committee, and chairman of its board of supervisors. In March 2018, he was elected chairman of Huawei Technologies Co., Ltd. and director-general of Shareholding Staff Council.

Business positions
Preceded by Sun Yafang	Chairman of Huawei Technologies Co., Ltd. 2018–present	Incumbent
