= Politics of Yiyang =

The Politics of Yiyang in Hunan province in the People's Republic of China is structured in a dual party-government system like all other governing institutions in mainland China.

The Mayor of Yiyang is the highest-ranking official in the People's Government of Yiyang or Yiyang Municipal Government. However, in the city's dual party-government governing system, the Mayor has less power than the Communist Party of Yiyang Municipal Committee Secretary, colloquially termed the "CPC Party Chief of Yiyang" or "Communist Party Secretary of Yiyang".

== History ==
On May 26, 2014, Yang Baohua was put under investigation for alleged "serious violations of discipline and laws." by the Central Commission for Discipline Inspection (CCDI), the Communist Party's anti-graft watchdog. He underwent investigation for corruption in 2014.

== List of mayors of Yiyang ==
No.	English name	Chinese name	Took office	Left office	Notes
1	Yang Baohua	阳宝华	June 1994	April 1995	
2	Li Jiang	李江	April 1995	March 1996	Acting
3	Li Jiang	李江	March 1996	January 1997	
4	Cai Lifeng	蔡力峰	January 1997	March 1997	
5	Cai Lifeng	蔡力峰	March 1997	February 2003	
6	Ma Yong	马勇	September 2006	January 2007	Acting
7	Ma Yong	马勇	January 2007	March 2008	
8	Hu Henghua	胡衡华	April 2008	January 2009	Acting
9	Hu Henghua	胡衡华	January 2009	January 2011	
10	Hu Zhongxiong	胡忠雄	January 2011	April 2011	
11	Hu Zhongxiong	胡忠雄	April 2011	March 2013	
12	Xu Xianhui	许显辉	March 2013	June 2015	Acting
13	Xu Xianhui	许显辉	May 2013	November 2016	
14	Zhang Zhiheng	张值恒	December 2016	January 2017	Acting
15	Zhang Zhiheng	张值恒	January 2017		

== List of CPC Party secretaries of Yiyang ==
No.	English name	Chinese name	Took office	Left office	Notes
1	Sun Zhenhui	孙振华	May 1994	January 1997	
2	Li Jiang	李江	January 1997	June 2003	
3	Jiang Zuobin	蒋作斌	June 2003	March 2008	
4	Ma Yong	马勇	March 2008	April 2013	
5	Wei Xuanjun	魏旋君	April 2013	June 2015	
6	Hu Zhongxiong	胡忠雄	June 2015	December 2016	
7	Qu Hai	瞿海	December 2016		
