= Nanquan =

Nanquan may refer to:

- Nanquan (martial art), a family of martial arts from Southern China
- Nanquan Puyuan (c. 749–c. 835), Chán (Zen) Buddhist master in China during the Tang Dynasty
- Nanquan Temple, a Buddhist temple in Xiangyin County, Hunan, China
- Nanquan, a town in Shifang, China
