= Yuan Yanwen =

Chinese politician

- 袁延文

Director of the Department of Agriculture and Rural Affairs of Hunan
- In office February 2018 – March 2023
- Preceded by: Liu Zonglin
- Succeeded by: TBA

Personal details
- Born: March 1965 (age 61) Dao County, Hunan, China
- Party: Chinese Communist Party
- Education: Hunan Agricultural University

Yuan Yanwen (Chinese: 袁延文; pinyin: Yuán Yánwén; born March 1965) is a former Chinese politician who spent his entire career in his home-province Hunan. As of March 2023 he was under investigation by China's top anti-corruption agency. Previously he served as director of the Department of Agriculture and Rural Affairs of Hunan.

He was a delegate to the 13th National People's Congress.

== Early life and education ==
Yuan was born in Dao County, Hunan, in March 1965. In 1981, he was accepted to Hunan Agricultural College (now Hunan Agricultural University), where he majored in veterinary medicine.

== Career ==
After graduating in 1985, Yuan became an official in Tongyin Township of Qiyang County, and finally was elevated to township head in February 1988. In January 1989, he was transferred to the Organization Department of the CCP Hengshan County Committee, and was appointed secretary of the Hengshan County Committee of the Communist Youth League of China in April 1991. In June 1993, he was transferred to the CPC Hengyang Municipal Committee, and became secretary of the Hengyang Municipal Committee of the Communist Youth League of China in November 1996. He served as magistrate of Hengdong County from May 2001 to February 2003, and party secretary, the top political position in the county, from February 2003 to November 2006. In September 2006, he was admitted to member of the CCP Hengyang Municipal Committee, the city's top authority. He also served as party secretary of Leiyang from November 2006 to September 2011. He also served as director of Hunan Provincial Bureau of Livestock and Fisheries from March 2012 to December 2017.

In September 2011, he was made deputy director of Hunan Provincial Department of Agriculture (later renamed Department of Agriculture and Rural Affairs of Hunan), rising to director in February 2018.

== Downfall ==
On 26 March 2023, Yuan was suspected of "serious violations of laws and regulations" by the Central Commission for Discipline Inspection (CCDI), the party's internal disciplinary body, and the National Supervisory Commission, the highest anti-corruption agency of China. His deputy Tang Jianchu (唐建初) was sacked for graft in September 2022.

Party political offices
Preceded by Liao Yanqiu	Communist Party Secretary of Leiyang; 2006–2011	Succeeded by Tang Wenfeng
Government offices
Preceded by Cao Yinghua	Director of Hunan Provincial Bureau of Livestock and Fisheries; 2012–2017	Succeeded by Xu Xuyang
Preceded by Liu Zonglin	Director of the Department of Agriculture and Rural Affairs of Hunan; 2018–2013	Succeeded by TBA
