= Wenxing Subdistrict =

Wenxing Subdistrict 文星街道
- Subdistrict
- Location in Yunnan.
- Coordinates: 28°40′56″N 112°54′09″E
- Country: People's Republic of China
- Province: Hunan
- Prefecture-level city: Yueyang
- County: Xiangyin County
- Designated (town): 1951

Area
  - Total: 52.85 km^{2} (20.41 sq mi)

Population (2019)
  - Total: 158,400
  - Density: 2,997/km^{2} (7,763/sq mi)
- Time zone: UTC+08:00 (China Standard)
- Postal code: 414699
- Area code: 0730

Wenxing Subdistrict (Chinese: 文星街道; pinyin: Wénxīng Jiēdào) is a subdistrict and the county seat of Xiangyin in Hunan, China. It was reformed through the amalgamation of Bainihu Township (白泥湖乡), Changkang Town (长康镇), Shitang Township (石塘乡), the former Wenxing Town (文星镇) and Yuanjiapu Town (袁家铺镇) on November 20, 2015. The town is located in the west central Xiangyin County, it is bordered by Miluo City to the west, Jinlong Town and Yuhua Township to the south, Helonghu Town and Jinghe Township to the west, and Santang Town to the north. The town has an area of 208.43 km^{2} (80.48 sq mi) with a population of 223,000 (as of 2015). Through the amalgamation of the village-level divisions in 2016, it was divided into 23 villages and 27 communities. Its seat is Xieping Village (谢坪村).

== History ==
After the establishment of the Communist State in 1949, the Chengguan District (城关区) was set up. It was renamed "Chengguan Town" (城关镇) in 1951. During the Great Leap Forward, its name was changed to "Bayi Commune" (八一公社; 'August First Commune'). It was renamed "Wenxing Town" (文星镇) in 1995 and "Wenxing Subdistrict" (文星街道) in 2019.

== Geography ==
It lies at the eastern of Xiangyin County, bordering Helonghu Town to the west, the towns of Yuhua and Jinghe to the south, the towns of Dongtang and Santang to the north, and Baishui Town to the east.

The Xiang River flows through the town south to north.

The East Lake is a lake in the subdistrict.

== Hospitals ==
- Xiangyin County No.1 Hospital
- Chinese Medicine Hospital of Xiangyin County

== Transportation ==
The G0421 Xuchang–Guangzhou Expressway passes across the subdistrict north to south.

The National Highway G240 is a south–north highway in the subdistrict.

== Tourist attractions ==
- Wangbin Park (望滨公园)
- East Lake Park
- Yangsha Lake Tourist Resort (洋沙湖旅游度假区)
- Xiangyin Confucian Temple
- Nanquan Temple
- Wenxing Pagoda (文星塔)
- Zuo Zongtang Cultural Park

== Gallery ==
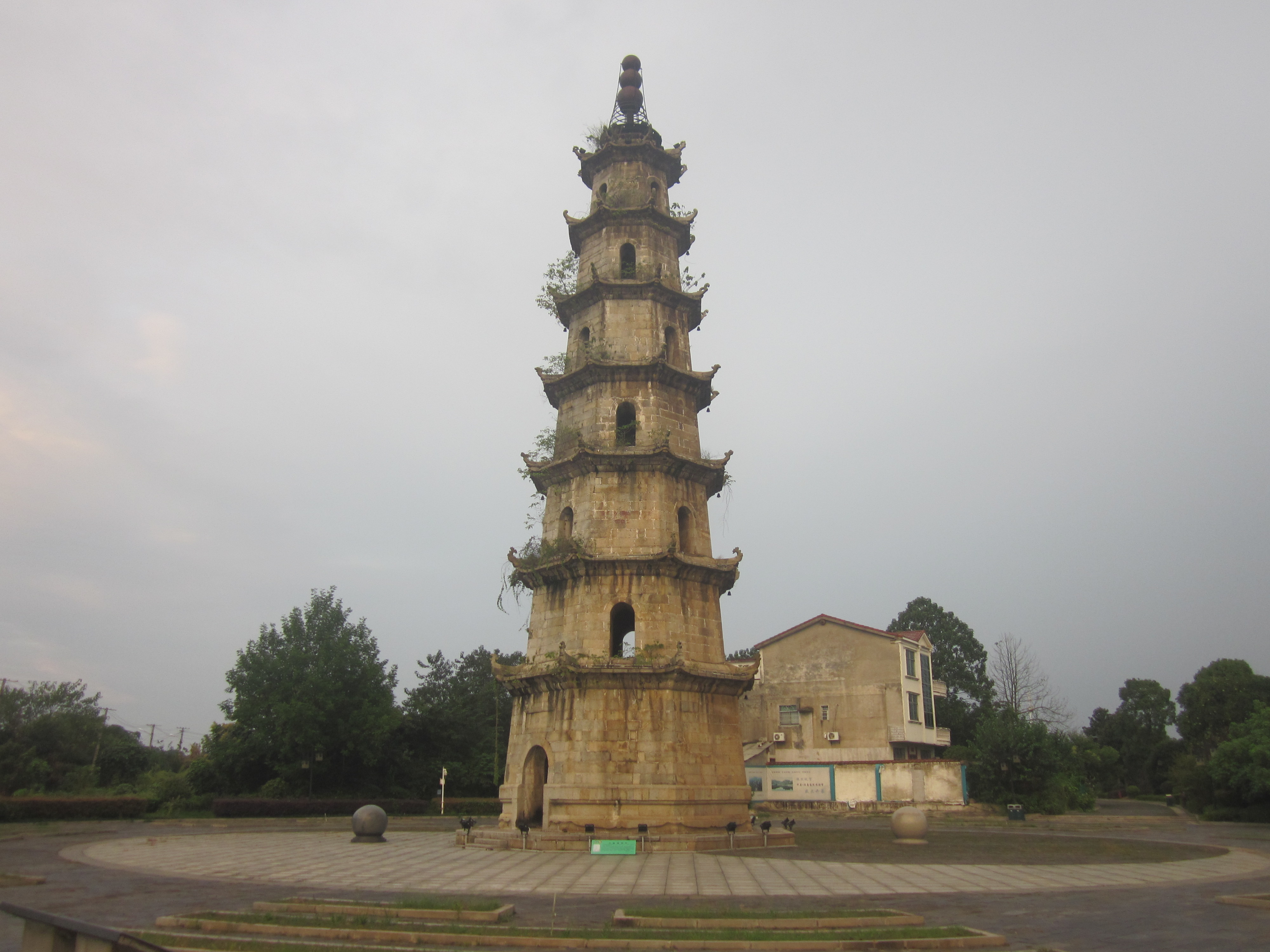
Wenxing Pagoda

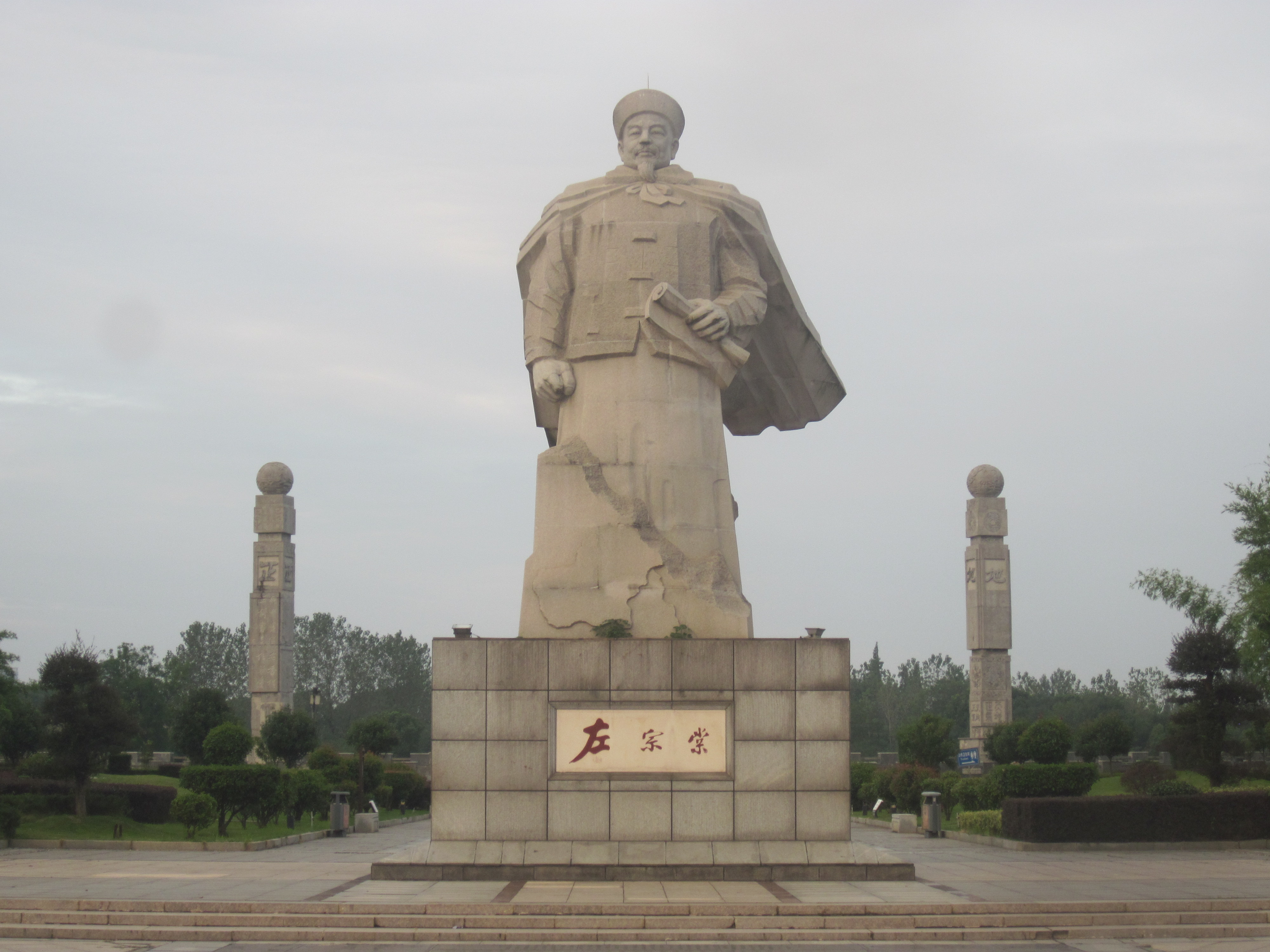
Statue of Zuo Zongtang in Zuo Zongtang Cultural Park

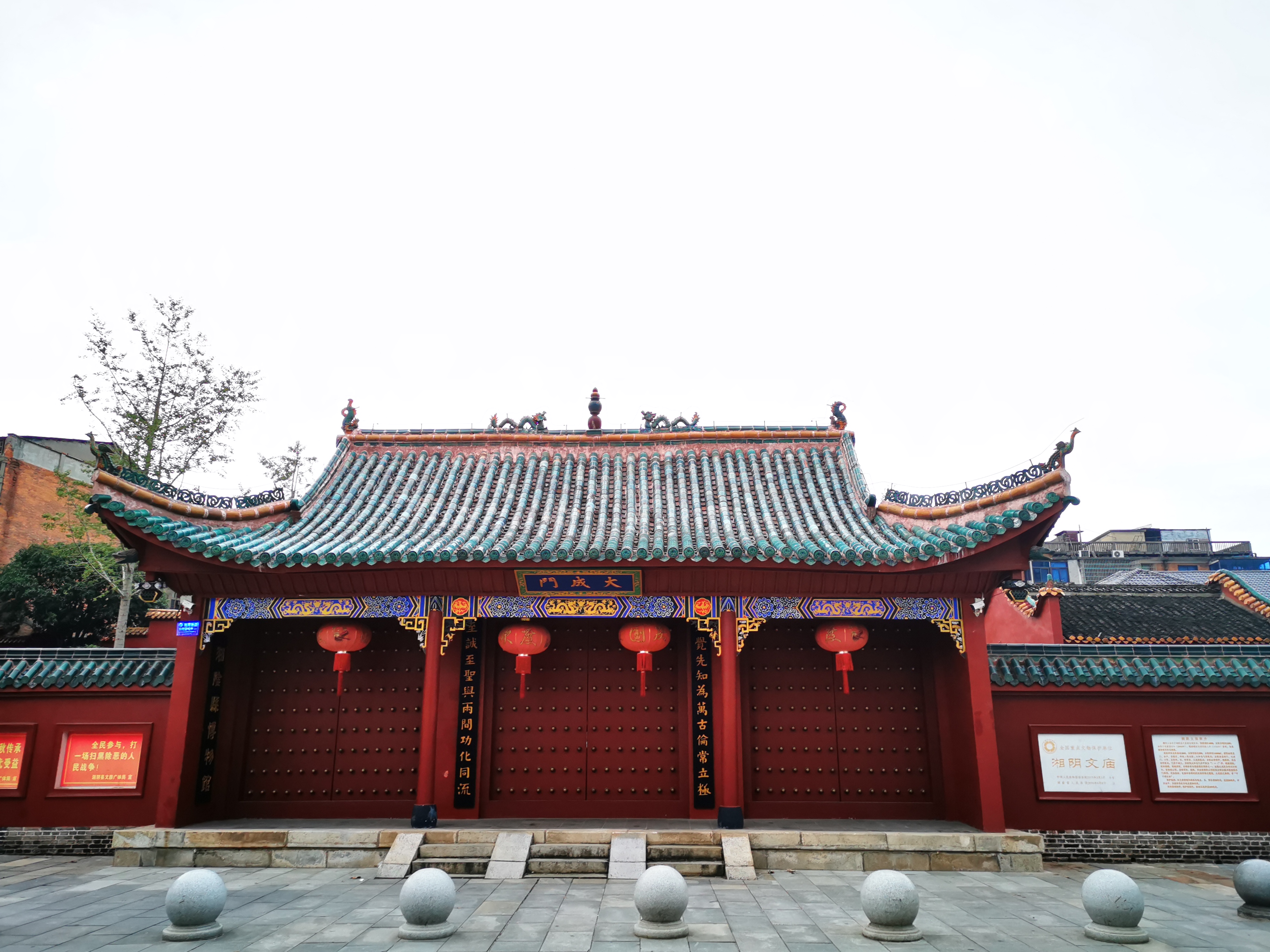
Dacheng Gate, Xiangyin Confucian Temple

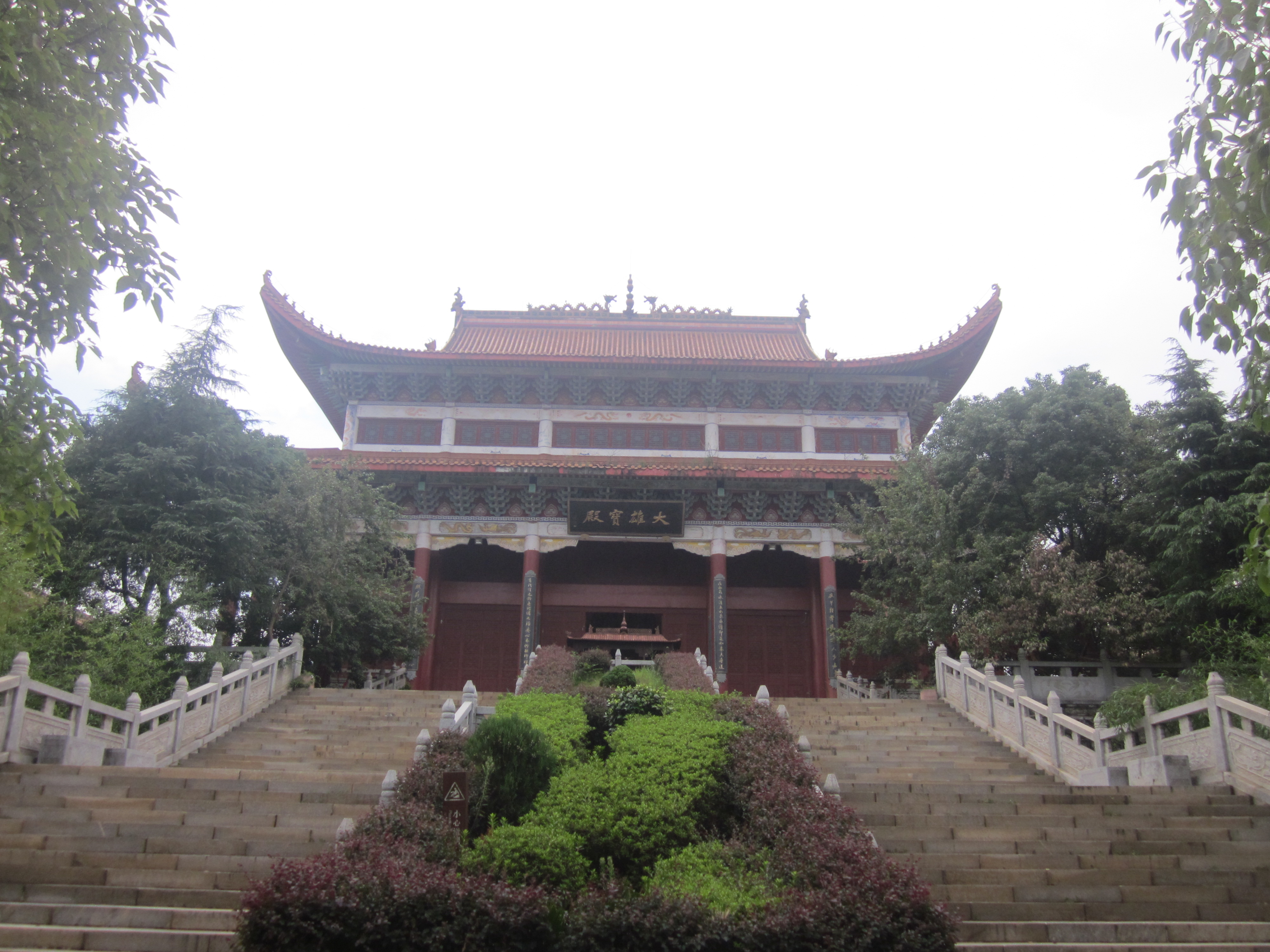
Mahavira Hall, Nanquan Temple
