= He Jiatie =

Chinese politician (born 1961)

He Jiatie (Chinese: 贺家铁; born October 1961) is a Chinese politician. A senior discipline official responsible for carrying out the anti-corruption campaign under Xi Jinping, He was investigated for breaching Chinese Communist Party discipline in 2016, and demoted to department-level (tingjuji; 厅局级). He was accused of leaking secrets related to party inspection work.

== Career timeline ==
He was born in Li County, Hunan. He joined the Chinese Communist Party (CCP) in 1983. He has a bachelor's degree from the Hunan Agricultural College (Changde campus), and has an MBA from Hunan University and a doctorate in management. He was a party disciplinary official for much of his career, beginning his term at the Hunan provincial commission for discipline inspection in 1996. He was put in charge of inspection work in Hunan province in 2000. In 2007, he was named provincial Direction of Supervision. In August 2008, he was sent to Beijing to serve as the head of the Cadre Supervision Department of the Central Organization Department.

== Anti-corruption campaign ==
In May 2013, he was named deputy head of the Fifth Inspection Group, in charge of Chongqing, where he assisted in bringing down municipal People's Congress Vice Chair Tan Qiwei. In November 2013, he was named deputy leader of the Fifth Inspection Group, in charge of Yunnan. In Yunnan, he was instrumental in exposing the corruption case of former provincial party chief Bai Enpei, vice governor Shen Peiping and Kunming party chief Zhang Tianxin. In July 2014, he was named deputy leader of the Fourth Inspection Group, in charge of Tianjin. In Tianjin, He helped bring down former Tianjin police chief Wu Changshun. In July 2014, he was named deputy leader of the Fourth Inspection Group, in charge of Tibet. It is believed that the inspection in Tibet brought down former security official Le Dake.

In September 2014, he left his line of work in inspection and became a member of the Hubei provincial Party Standing Committee and head of party organization in Hubei, succeeding Lou Yangsheng. Sometime in 2015, He was investigated by the CCP's Central Commission for Discipline Inspection (CCDI) for breaching discipline.

On February 6, 2016, the CCDI announced that He was dismissed from his positions and demoted one level to a non-leading tingjuji (i.e., department-level) position. In its announcement, the CCDI stated that He "violated political rules and breached political discipline, leaked secrets related to inspection work; severely violated the spirit of the Eight-point Regulation, frequently visited private clubs, and used public funds for personal expenses."
