= Jizhong Zhou =

American biologist

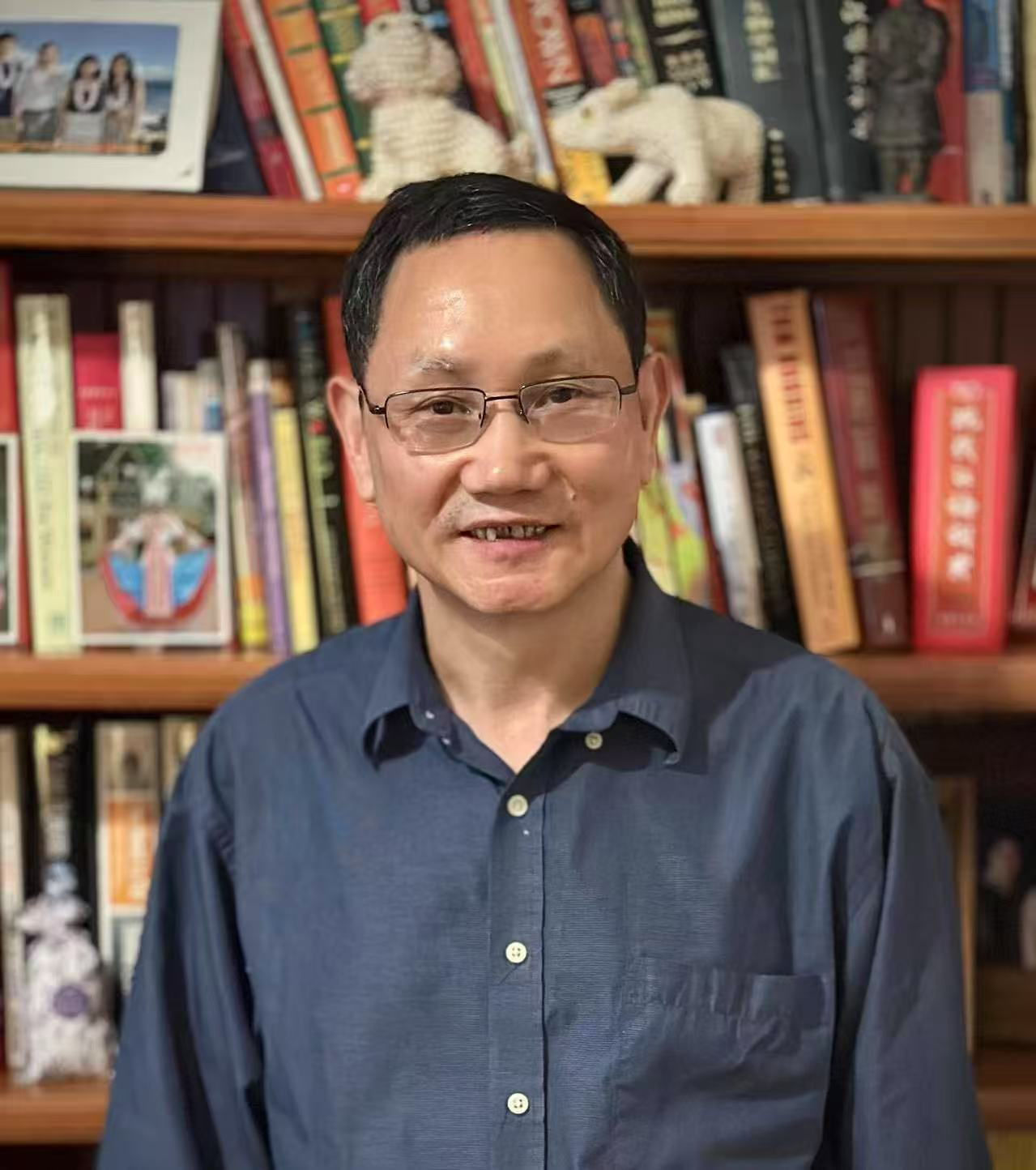
- Education: Washington State University; Michigan State University; Hunan Agricultural University
- Awards: 2024, Distinguished Scientist Award by Southeastern Universities Research Association (SURA); 2022, SSSA Award for soil science; ASM Award for Environmental Research; 2009, R&D 100 Award for GeoChip development; 2001, Presidential Early Career Award for Scientists and Engineers (PECASE)
- Scientific career
- Fields: Biology
- Workplaces: University of Oklahoma
- Website: https://www.ou.edu/ieg

Jizhong Zhou (Chinese: 周集中) is an internationally renowned microbial ecologist and member of the National Academy of Sciences, American Academy of Arts and Sciences, and Academia Europaea. Dr. Zhou is a George Lynn Cross Research Professor and Presidential Professor in the School of Biological Sciences, Director of the Institute for Environmental Genomics, and an Adjunct Professor at School of Civil Engineering, Environmental Sciences, and the School of Computer Sciences, University of Oklahoma. He is also an Adjunct Senior Scientist at Earth and Environmental Sciences, Lawrence Berkeley National Laboratory.

== Education ==
- 1996-1997, Postdoc, Microbial ecology, Alexander Hollaender Distinguished Postdoctoral Fellow, Environmental Sciences Division, Oak Ridge National Laboratory (Mentor: Anthony V. Palumbo)
- 1993-1995, Postdoc, Microbial ecology, Center for Microbial Ecology, Michigan State University (Advisor: James M. Tiedje)
- 1990-1993, Ph.D., Molecular Biology, Washington State University (Advisor: Prof. Andris Kleinhofs)
- 1986-1988, Ph.D. Candidate, Systems Ecology, Research Center for Eco-Environmental Sciences, Chinese Academy of Sciences, China (Advisor: Prof. Shijun Ma)
- 1982-1984, M.S., Mathematical Ecology, Hunan Agricultural University, China (Advisor: Prof. Changmin Chen)
- 1978-1981, B.S., Plant Pathology and Entomology, Hunan Agricultural University, China

== Major awards ==
- 2024, Distinguished Scientist Award by Southeastern Universities Research Association (SURA) - Recognizes researchers whose work fulfills SURA's mission to advance collaborative research and strengthen scientific capabilities
- 2024, Inaugural Lifetime Achievement Award from University of Oklahoma - The university's highest academic honor, recognizing exceptional and innovative research with broad societal impact
- 2022, ISME-IWA BioCluster Grand Prize Award - Jointly awarded by the International Society for Microbial Ecology and International Water Association for interdisciplinary research bridging microbial ecology and water treatment technologies
- 2022, SSSA Award for soil sciences - Recognizes significant advances in soil science research
- 2019, ASM Award for Environmental Research - Honors outstanding achievements in environmental microbiology and microbial ecology research
- 2015, DOE’s Ernest Orlando Lawrence Award - The U.S. Department of Energy's highest scientific honor, awarded for exceptional contributions to research
- 2009, R&D 100 Award - Recognized by ''R&D Magazine'' for developing GeoChip, selected as one of the year's 100 most significant technological innovations
- 2001, Presidential Early Career Award for Scientists and Engineers (PECASE) - The highest U.S. government honor for early-career scientists and engineers, awarded by the White House
- 1996, Alexander Hollaender Distinguished Postdoctoral Award - Established by the U.S. Department of Energy as one of America's most prestigious postdoctoral honors.

== Major honors ==
- 2025, Member of the National Academy of Sciences
- 2024, Member of Academia Europaea
- 2024, Fellow of Soil Science Society of America
- 2023, Member of American Academy of Arts and Sciences
- 2023-present, ranked at the top #25 scientist worldwide and top #12 across US in Ecology and Evolution by Research.com, at the top #38 worldwide and #20 in US in the field of Microbiology
- 2021, Among the 2021 Reuters List of World's Top 1000 Climate Scientists
- 2020, Fellow of the International Water Association.
- 2018-present, top 0.1% highly Cited Researcher in both fields of Microbiology, and Environment & Ecology by Web of Science. Only 6% of the highly cited researchers appear in > two fields
- 2019-present, World's most cited researcher (top 0.05%) across all science & engineering fields
- Most highly cited researcher (H-index > 100) according to their Google Scholar Citations
- 2018, Fellow of the Ecological Society of America
- 2014, George Lynn Cross Research Professor
- 2008, Fellow of American Association for the Advancement of Science
- 2007-present, Honorary Director, Chinese Association of Microbial Ecology (CAME)
- 2005, Fellow of American Academy of Microbiology

== Awards established ==
=== Cindy and Jizhong Zhou Graduate Student/Post-doctorate Travel Award in Environmental Science and Technology ===
Based at the University of Oklahoma, this award supports graduate students and postdoctoral researchers in environmental science and technology for conference travel and research exchanges.

=== Jizhong Zhou Award on Microbial Ecology for Outstanding Middle Career Microbial Ecologists ===
Established in 2017 by the Chinese Society for Microbial Ecology (CSME), this award honors outstanding mid-career researchers in microbial ecology.

== Journal editor ==
- 2021-Present, Co Editor-in-Chief, mLife
- 2019-Present, Associate Editor for Microbiome/Environmental Microbiome
- 2017-2023, Senior Editor, ISME Journal
- 2014-2020, Section Editor, Microbial Ecology and Evolution, BMC Microbiology
- 2009-2019, Senior Editor, mBio, ASM flagship journal
- 2003-2013, Editor, Applied and Environmental Microbiology

== Selected publications ==
- Climate Change Biology
  - Tao et al. 2024. Climate warming accelerates positive soil priming in a temperate grassland ecosystem. Nature Communications, 15:1178
  - Zhang et al. 2023. Experimental Warming Leads to Convergent Succession of Grassland Archaeal Community. Nature Climate Change, 13, 561–569
  - Wu et al. 2022. Reduction of microbial diversity in grassland soil is driven by long-term climate warming. Nature Microbiology. 7, 1054–1062. (top 1% highly cited hot paper)
  - Yuan et al. 2021. Climate Warming Enhances Microbial Network Complexity and Stability. Nature Climate Change, 11:343-348. (top 1% highly cited)
  - Gao et al. 2020. Stimulation of soil respiration by elevated CO2 is enhanced under nitrogen limitation in a decade-long grassland study. Proc. Nat. Acad. Sci., 117: 33317-33324
  - Guo et al. 2020. Gene-informed decomposition model predicts lower soil carbon loss due to persistent microbial adaptation to warming. Nature Communications. 11, 4897. doi:10.1038/s41467-020-18706-z
  - Guo et al. 2019. Climate warming accelerates temporal scaling of grassland soil microbial biodiversity. Nature Ecol & Evol., 3, 612–61
  - Guo et al. 2018. Climate Warming Leads to Divergent Succession of Grassland Microbial Communities. Nature Climate Change. 8:813-818 (top 1% highly cited)
  - Xue et al. 2016. Tundra soil carbon is vulnerable to rapid microbial decomposition under climate warming. Nature Climate Change, 6: 595-600 (was top 1% highly cited)
  - Zhou et al. 2012. Microbial Mediation of Carbon Cycle Feedbacks to Climate Warming. Nature Climate Change, 2:106-110. (top 1% highly cited)
  - Deysh et al. 1998. Isolation of acidophilic methane-oxidizing bacteria from northern peat wetlands. Science, 282: 281-284
- Environmental remediation
  - Wu, et al. 2019. Global diversity and biogeography of bacterial communities in wastewater treatment plants. Nature Microbiology, 4:1183–1195. (top 1% highly cited)
  - Zhou et al. 2014. Stochasticity, Succession and Environmental Perturbations in a Fluidic Ecosystem. Proc. Nat. Acad. Sci., 111: E836-E845. (top 1% highly cited)
  - Hazen et al. 2010. Deep-sea oil plume enriches Indigenous oil-degrading bacteria. Science, 330: 204-208. (top 1% highly cited)
  - Xu et al. 2010. Responses of microbial community functional structures to pilot-scale uranium in situ bioremediation. ISME J, 4:1060-1070
  - Liu et al. 2003. Transcriptome dynamics of Deinococcus radiodurans recovering from ionizing radiation. Proc. Nat. Acad. Sci, 100: 4191-4196
  - Liu et al. 1997. Thermophilic Fe(III)-reducing bacteria from the deep subsurface: The evolutionary implications. Science 277: 1106-1109
- Theoretical Ecology
  - Ning et al. 2024. Environmental stress mediates groundwater microbial community assembly. Nature Microbiology, 9:490-501. (Top 0.1% highly cited hot paper)
  - Buzzard et al. 2019. Continental scale structuring of forest and soil diversity via functional traits. Nature Ecol. & Evol., 3, 1298–1308
  - Zhou and Ning. 2017. Stochastic Community Assembly: Does It Matter in Microbial Ecology? Microbiology and Molecular Biology Reviews, 81:e00002-17 (top 1% highly cited)
  - Zhou et al. 2016. Temperature mediates continental-scale diversity of microbes in forest soils. Nature Communication, 7:12083, doi:10.1038/ncomms12083 (top 1% highly cited)
  - Zhou et al. 2013. Stochastic assembly leads to alternative communities with distinct functions. mBio, 4: e00584-12
  - Zhou et al. 2008. Spatial Scaling of Functional Gene Diversity across Various Microbial Taxa. Proc Nat. Acad. Sci. 105: 7768-7773
  - Zhou et al. 2002. Spatial and resource factors influencing high soil microbial diversity. Appl. Environ. Microbiol. 68: 326-334
- Experimental genomic technologies
  - Zhou et al. 2015. High-Throughput Metagenomic Technologies for Complex Microbial Community Analysis: Open and Closed Formats. mBio 6:e02288-14 (top 1% highly cited)
  - Zhou et al. 2011. Reproducibility and Quantitation of Amplicon Sequencing-Based Detection. ISME J, 5:1303-1313 (top 1% highly cited)
  - Zhou et al. 2013. Random Sampling Process Leads to Overestimation of β-Diversity of Microbial Communities. mBio 4: e00324-13.
  - He et al. 2007. GeoChip: A comprehensive microarray for investigating biogeochemical, ecological, and environmental processes. ISME J, 1: 67-77 (Among the 5 top-cited papers for the first 10 years of ISME J)
  - Zhou et al. 1996. DNA recovery from soils of diverse composition. Appl. Environ. Microbiol. 62: 316-322 (>3,900 citations) (Among the 20 most cited papers in AEM history, since 2008)
- Computational genomic technologies
  - Xiao, et al. 2022. Disentangling Direct from Indirect Relationships in Association Networks. Proc. Nat. Acad. Sci., 119 No. 2 e2109995119, https://doi.org/10.1073/pnas.2109995119. (top 1% highly cited)
  - Ning et al. 2020. A quantitative framework reveals ecological drivers of grassland soil microbial community assembly in response to warming. Nature Communication, 11:4717. (top 1% highly cited)
  - Ning et al. 2019. A General Framework for Quantitatively Assessing Ecological Stochasticity. Proc. Nat. Acad. Sci., 116: 16893-16898. (top 1% highly cited)
  - Deng et al. 2016. Network succession reveals the importance of competition in response to emulsified vegetable oil amendment for uranium bioremediation. Environ. Microbiol., 18: 205-218; (top 1% highly cited)
  - Deng et al. 2012. Molecular Ecological Network Analyses. BMC Bioinformatics, 13:113 (top 1% highly cited)
  - Zhou et al. 2011. Phylogenetic molecular ecological network of soil microbial communities in response to elevated CO2. mBio 2: e00122-11. (top 1% highly cited)
  - Zhou et al. 2010. Functional Molecular Ecological Networks. mBio 1:e00169-10
