= Xiangyin County =

Xiangyin County 湘阴县 Hsiangyin; Siangyin
- County
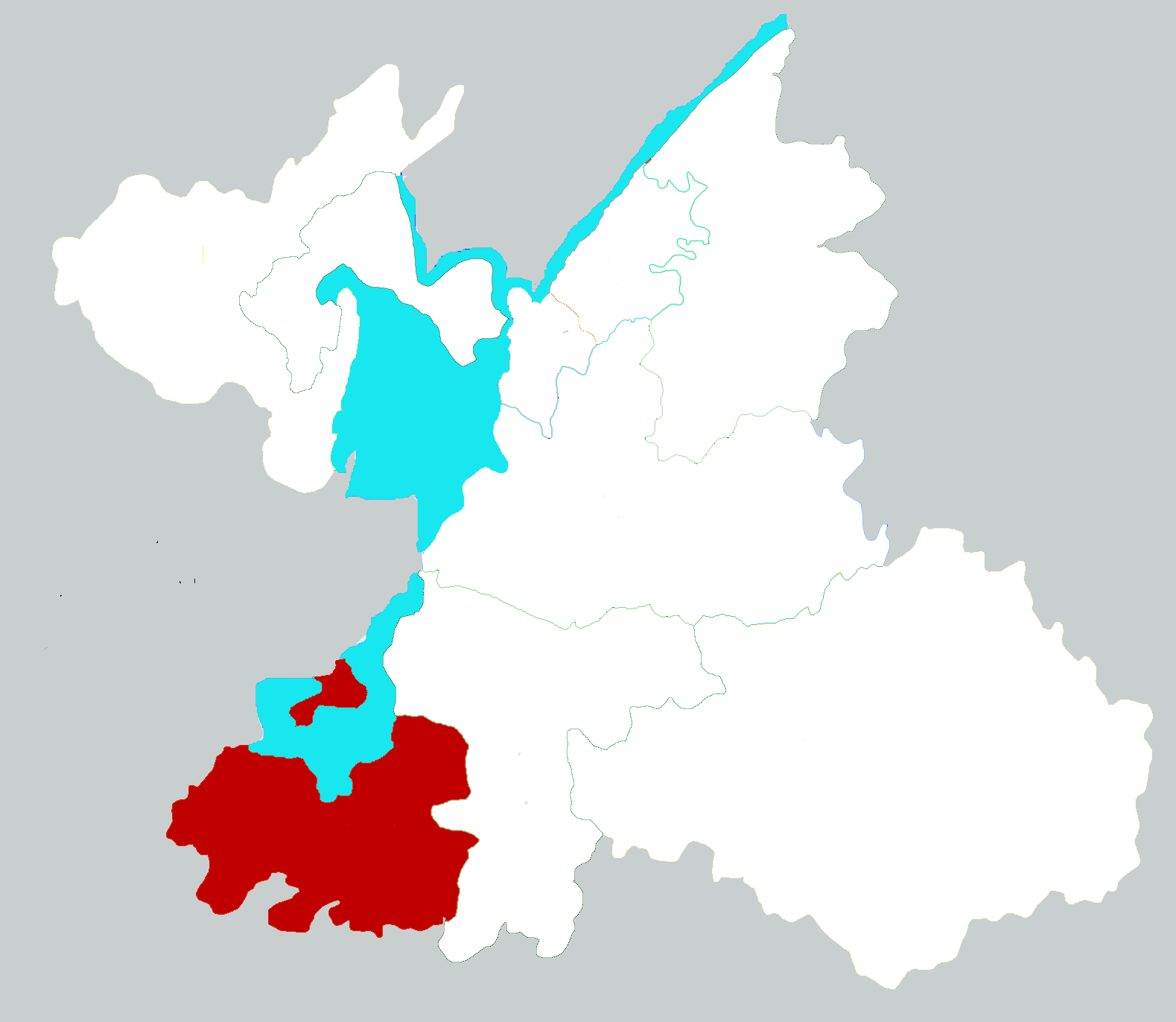
- Location of Xiangyin County within Yueyang

- Location in Hunan
- Coordinates: 28°41′25″N 112°54′33″E
- Country: People's Republic of China
- Province: Hunan
- Prefecture-level city: Yueyang

Area
  - Total: 1,541.46 km^{2} (595.16 sq mi)

Population
  - Total: 583,900
  - Density: 378.8/km^{2} (981.1/sq mi)
- Time zone: UTC+8 (China Standard)

Xiangyin County (simplified Chinese: 湘阴县; traditional Chinese: 湘陰縣; pinyin: Xiāngyīn Xiàn) is a county in Hunan Province, China, under the administration of Yueyang City. Located on the southeastern shores of Lake Dongting, the Xiang River runs south to north through the middle lands of the county, the Zi River merges into Dongting in the westeastern margin. Xiangyin is bordered by Yueyang County, Yuanjiang City to the north, Heshan District of Yiyang to the west, Wangcheng District of Changsha to the south, and Miluo City to the east. It has an area of 1,581.5 km^{2} (610.6 sq mi) with a population of roughly 770,000. The county is divided into 14 township-level divisions with the county seat at Wenxing Town.

== Administrative divisions ==
After an adjustment of township-level administrative divisions of Xiangyin county on 20 November 2015, Xiangyin has four townships and 10 towns under its jurisdiction. They are:

4 townships

- Jinghe (静河乡)
- Liutang (六塘乡)
- Yanglinzhai (杨林寨乡)
- Yuhua (玉华乡)

10 towns

- Dongtang (东塘镇)
- Helonghu (鹤龙湖镇)
- Jinlong (金龙镇)
- Lingbei (岭北镇)
- Nanhuzhou (南湖洲镇)
- Santang (三塘镇)
- Wenxing (文星镇)
- Xiangbin (湘滨镇)
- Xinquan (新泉镇)
- Zhangshu (樟树镇)

== Notable people ==
- Guo Songtao, Chinese diplomat and statesman during the Qing dynasty.
- Zuo Zongtang, Qing dynasty statesman and military leader.
- Fan Xudong, famous chemist during the period of Republic of China.
- Zhong Zhihua, member of Chinese Academy of Engineering, former president of Tongji University, former president of Hunan University.
- Yang Mengfei, member of Chinese Academy of Sciences.
- Hu Zhiying, contemporary artist, educator and poet.
- Gan Lin, agronomist and director of the State Anti-Monopoly Bureau.

== Climate ==
Climate data for Xiangyin, elevation 63 m (207 ft), (1991–2020 normals, extremes 1981–2010)
Month	Jan	Feb	Mar	Apr	May	Jun	Jul	Aug	Sep	Oct	Nov	Dec	Year
Record high °C (°F)	23.2 (73.8)	29.5 (85.1)	32.5 (90.5)	34.7 (94.5)	36.0 (96.8)	37.4 (99.3)	39.5 (103.1)	40.0 (104.0)	37.2 (99.0)	34.8 (94.6)	31.0 (87.8)	23.7 (74.7)	40.0 (104.0)
Mean daily maximum °C (°F)	8.3 (46.9)	11.3 (52.3)	15.8 (60.4)	22.1 (71.8)	26.7 (80.1)	29.8 (85.6)	33.2 (91.8)	32.4 (90.3)	28.2 (82.8)	22.8 (73.0)	17.0 (62.6)	11.0 (51.8)	21.6 (70.8)
Daily mean °C (°F)	4.9 (40.8)	7.6 (45.7)	11.8 (53.2)	17.9 (64.2)	22.6 (72.7)	26.1 (79.0)	29.3 (84.7)	28.5 (83.3)	24.1 (75.4)	18.6 (65.5)	12.7 (54.9)	7.2 (45.0)	17.6 (63.7)
Mean daily minimum °C (°F)	2.5 (36.5)	4.9 (40.8)	8.9 (48.0)	14.6 (58.3)	19.3 (66.7)	23.2 (73.8)	26.3 (79.3)	25.5 (77.9)	21.1 (70.0)	15.5 (59.9)	9.7 (49.5)	4.4 (39.9)	14.7 (58.4)
Record low °C (°F)	−6.9 (19.6)	−8.6 (16.5)	−2.1 (28.2)	2.5 (36.5)	9.7 (49.5)	13.1 (55.6)	19.4 (66.9)	17.2 (63.0)	12.4 (54.3)	3.5 (38.3)	−2.5 (27.5)	−10.7 (12.7)	−10.7 (12.7)
Average precipitation mm (inches)	78.5 (3.09)	84.7 (3.33)	153.0 (6.02)	179.8 (7.08)	203.4 (8.01)	203.1 (8.00)	174.7 (6.88)	133.6 (5.26)	80.4 (3.17)	75.8 (2.98)	79.5 (3.13)	52.1 (2.05)	1,498.6 (59)
Average precipitation days (≥ 0.1 mm)	13.6	13.7	16.8	15.7	15.6	14.4	10.5	10.4	9.5	10.8	10.7	10.5	152.2
Average snowy days	5.1	2.9	0.6	0	0	0	0	0	0	0	0.2	1.6	10.4
Average relative humidity (%)	81	80	81	79	79	82	76	78	80	81	80	78	80
Mean monthly sunshine hours	75.6	78.5	95.4	124.9	149.5	145.5	226.1	214.5	161.6	137.7	117.5	107.1	1,633.9
Percentage possible sunshine	23	25	26	32	36	35	53	53	44	39	37	34	36
Source: China Meteorological Administration

== Gallery ==
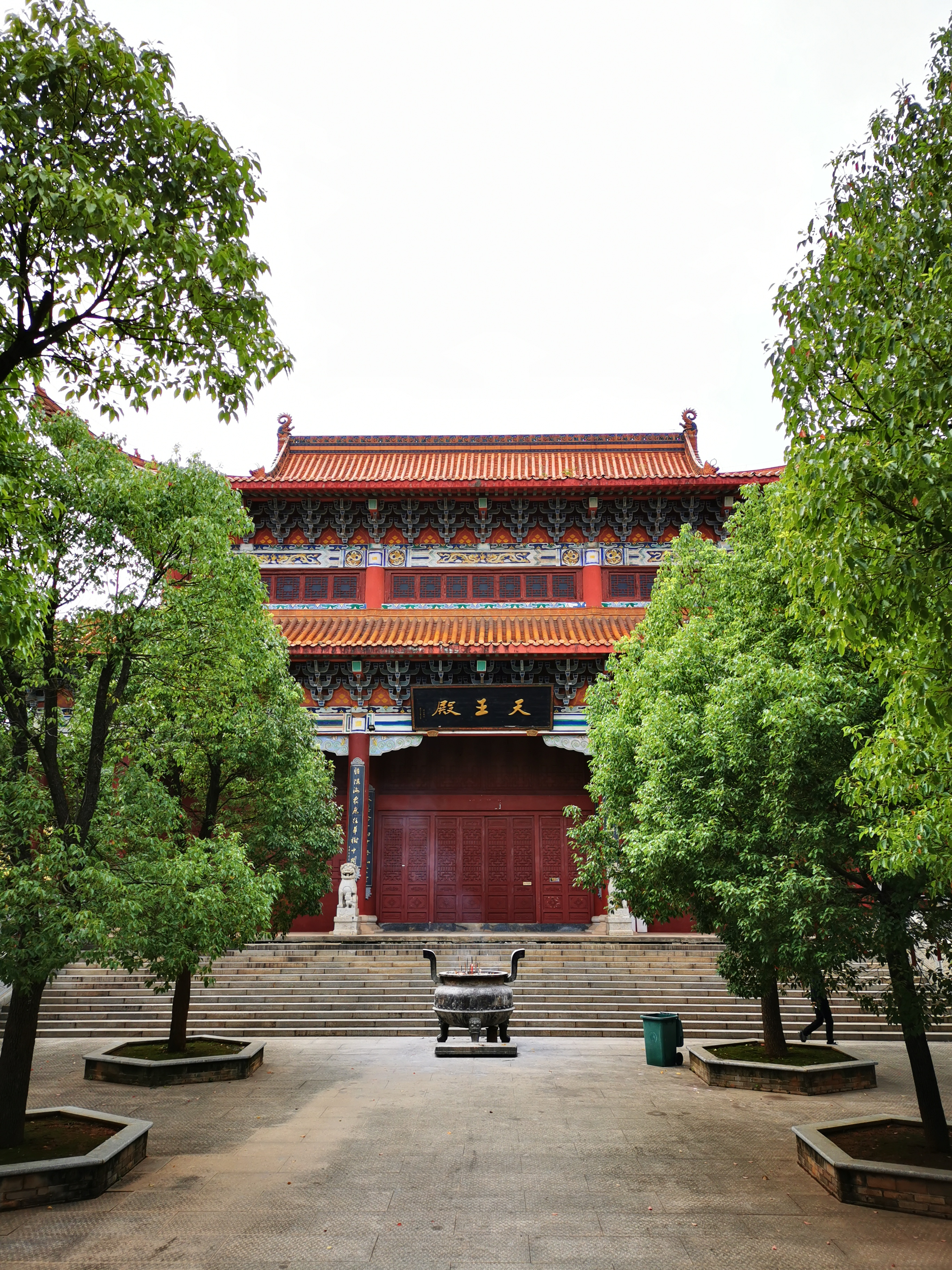
Nanquan Buddhist Temple

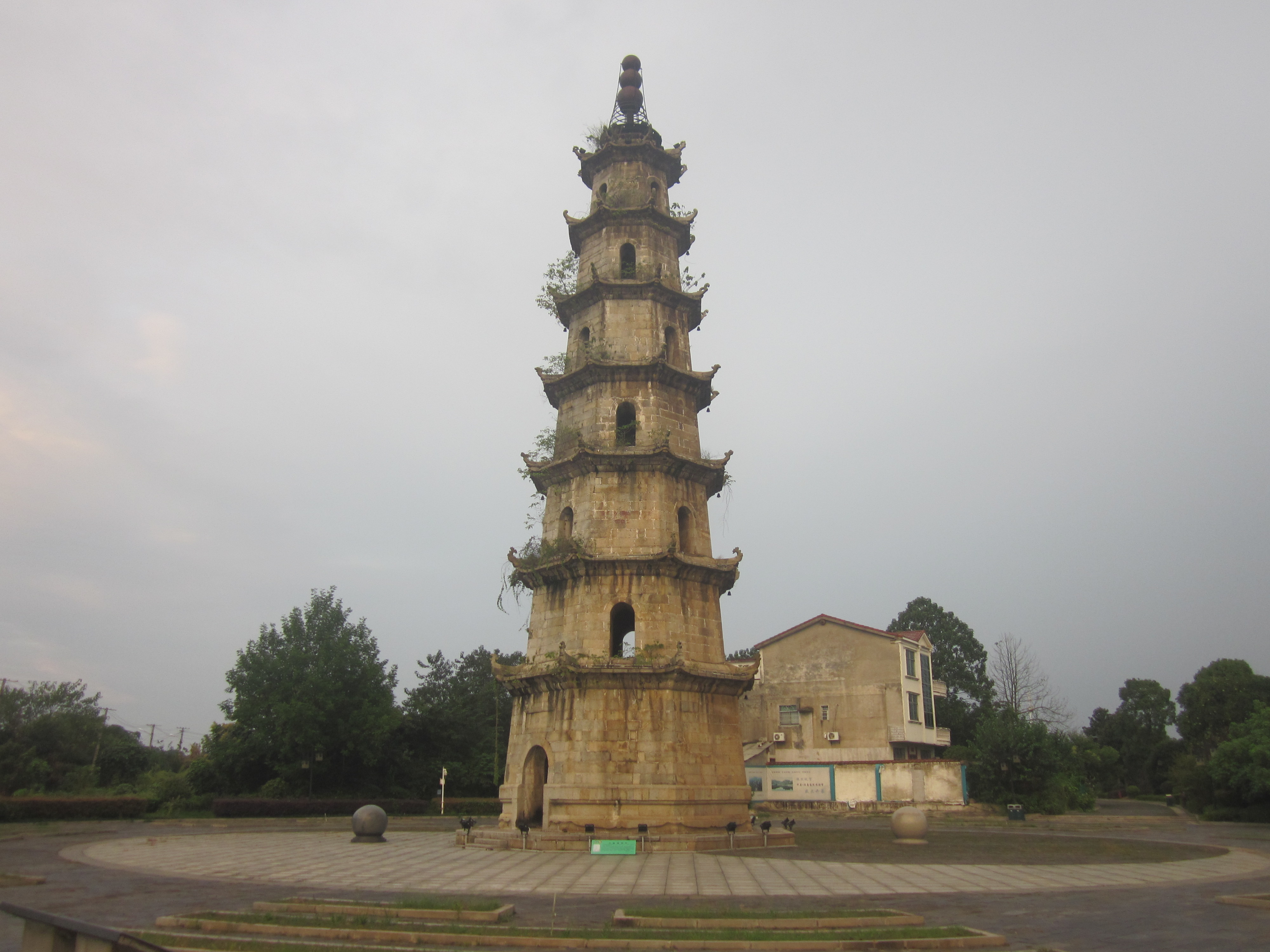
Wenxing Pagoda, built in 1795

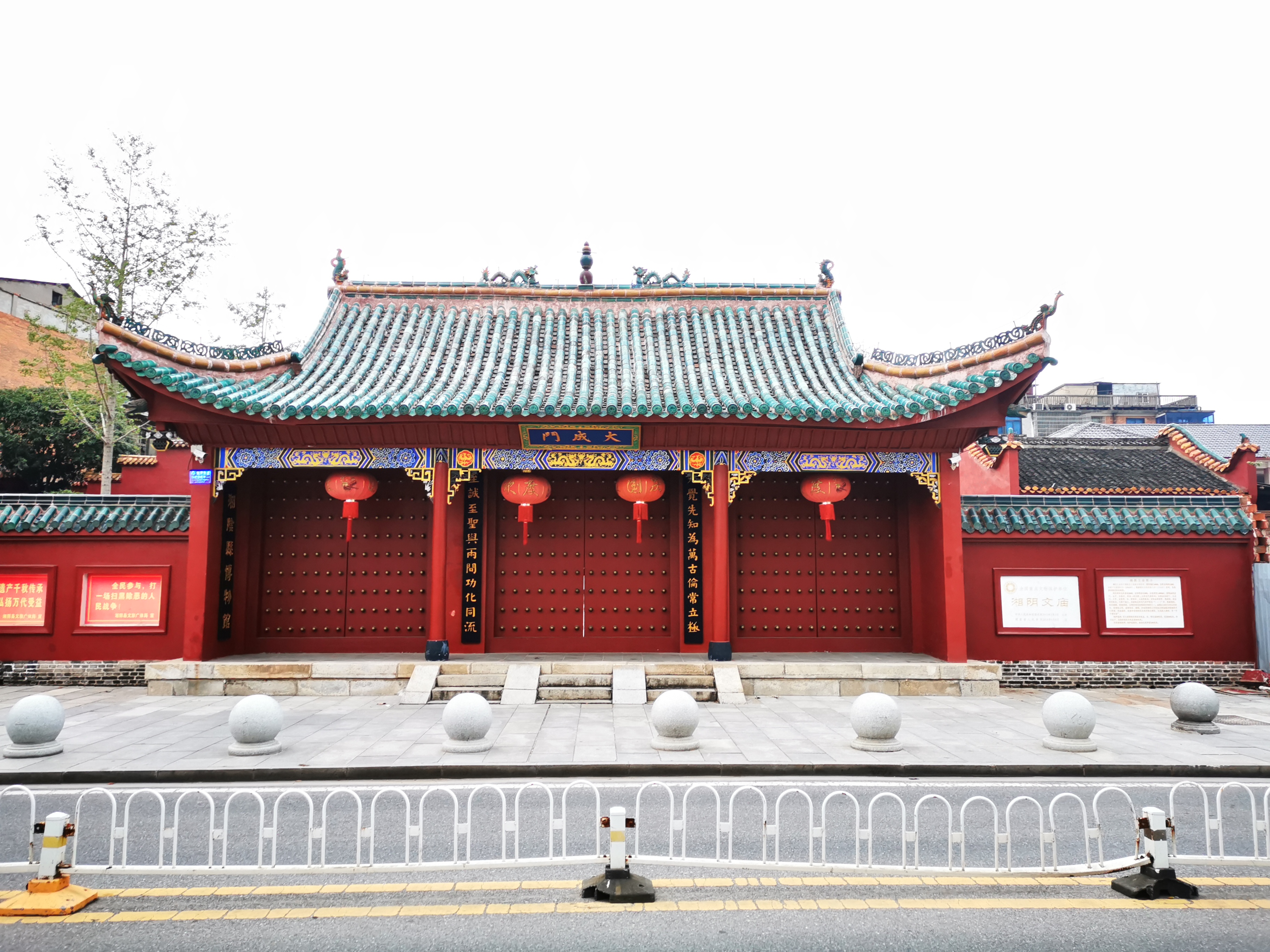
Xiangyin Confucian Temple

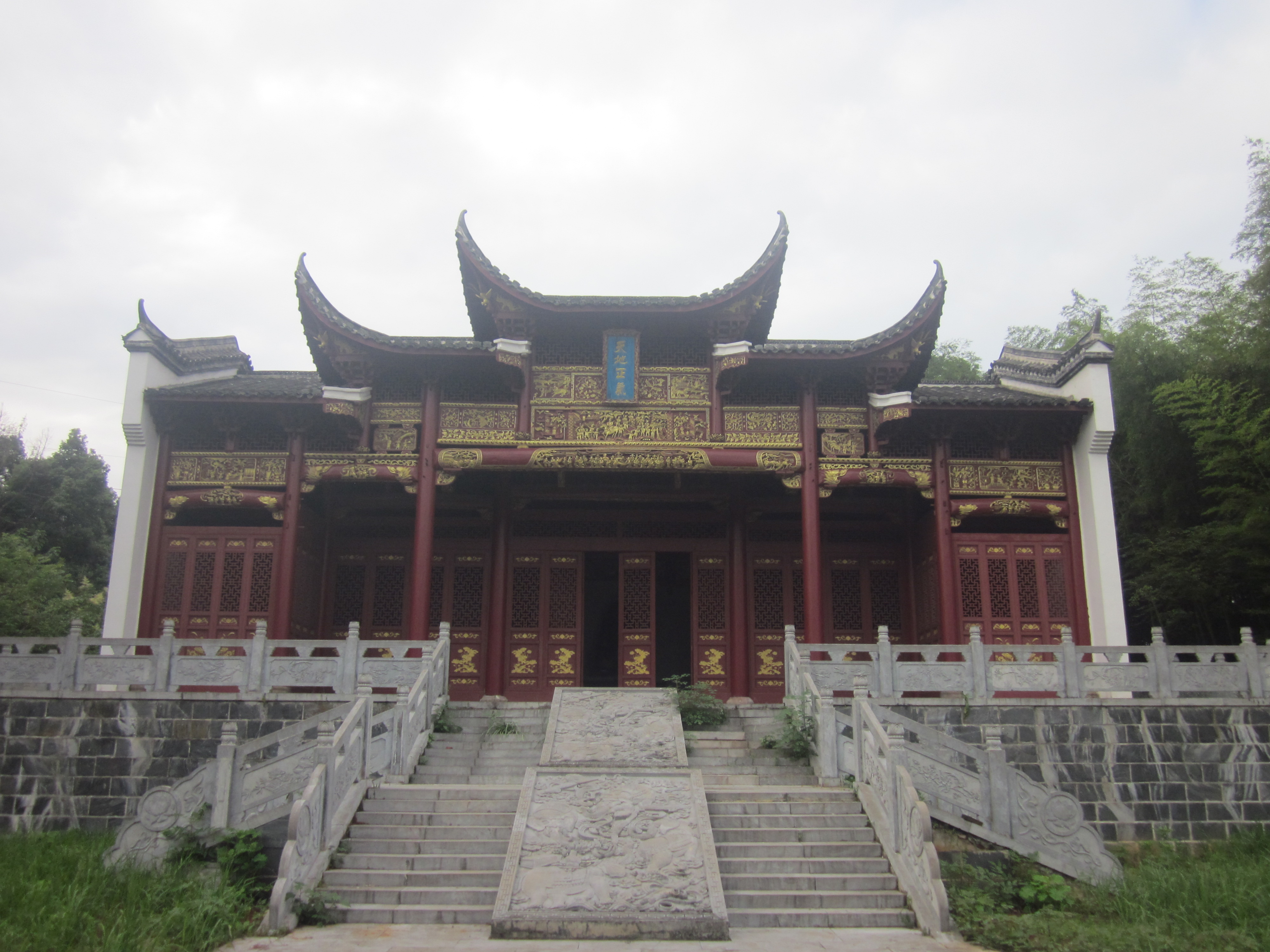
Zuo Zongtang Memorial Temple

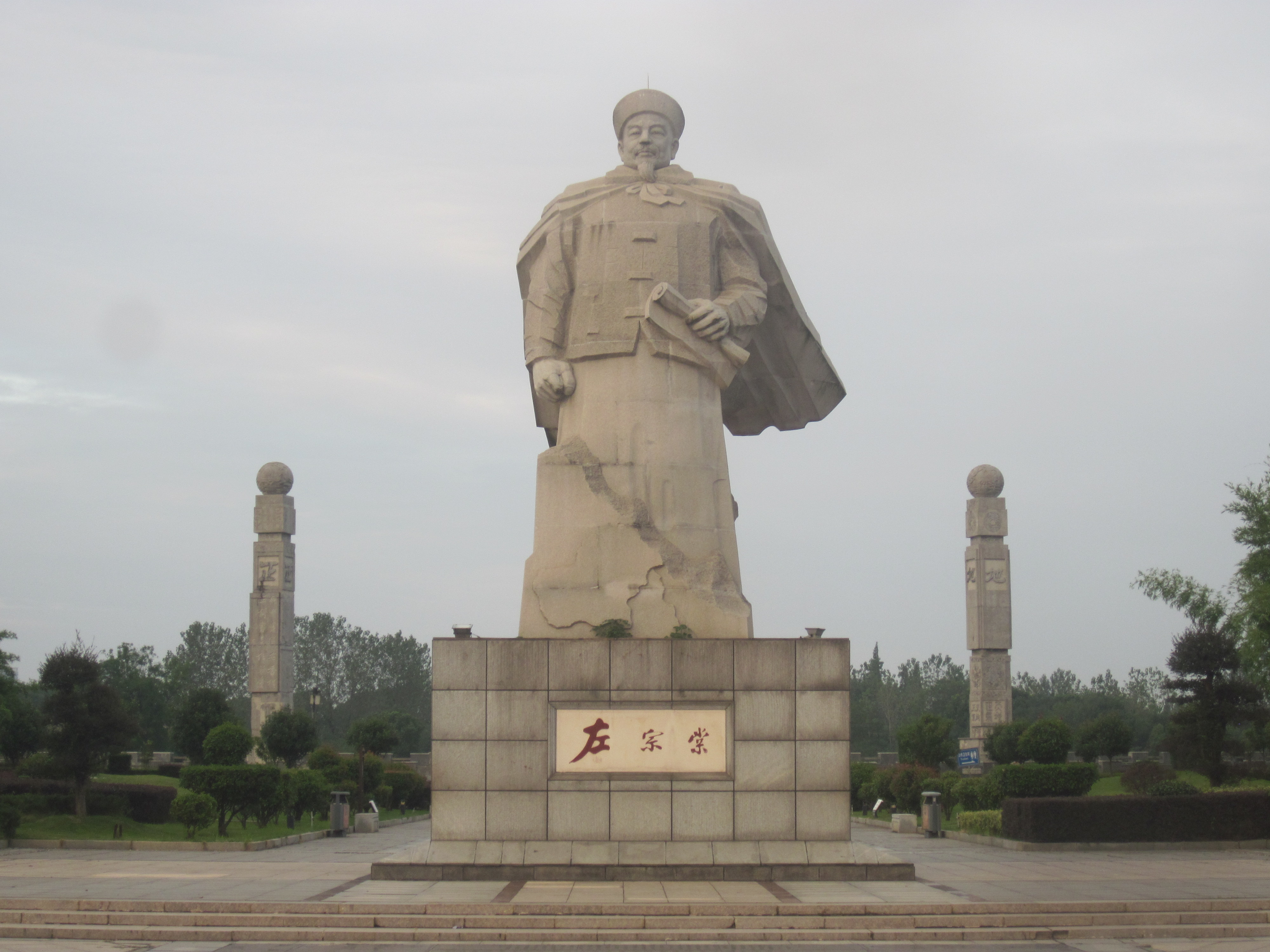
Zuo Zongtang Cultural Park
