= Hu Dujing =

Chinese plant physiologist (1913–2019)

Hu Dujing (Chinese: 胡笃敬; 1913 – 25 October 2019) was a Chinese plant physiologist, agronomist, and educator. He was a long-time professor at Hunan Agricultural University and co-founded the university's Department of Botany in 1951.

== Biography ==
Hu was born in 1913 in Changsha, Hunan, Republic of China, with his ancestral home in Xiangtan. After graduating from Wuhan University, he pursued graduate studies in plant hormone and mineral nutrient at the Institute of Agriculture at National Southwestern Associated University under academician Tang Peisong. His research paper on plant growth hormone was published in the journal Science in April 1940.

Hu taught at Guangdong Institute of Arts and Sciences, Sun Yat-sen University, Hubei Agricultural College (now part of Huazhong Agricultural University), Keqiang College (now part of Hunan University), and Hunan Agricultural College (now Hunan Agricultural University).

In 1951, Hu Dujiang and Luo Zemin founded the Department of Botany (originally Department of Plant Physiology and Biochemistry) at Hunan Agricultural College. Under his leadership, the department established a number of key laboratories. It was recognized by the government of Hunan as a key department of the province and won a number of national and provincial awards. Hu was awarded the honour of "National Excellent Teacher" by the Chinese government and the HAU Faculty Star by Hunan Agricultural University in 1998. From 1988 to 1993, he served as a member of the Standing Committee of the Political Council of Hunan Province.

Hu researched the cultivation of Eucommia ulmoides (duzhong) in Hunan to produce Eucommia ulmoides gum as a substitute for rubber. From 1978 to the 1980s, his group tested more than 70 plants and found 20 high-potassium plants for use as biological potassium fertilizer.

On 25 October 2019, Hu died at the Hunan Agricultural University Hospital in Changsha, aged 106 (107 in East Asian age reckoning).
