= Xiangyin Confucius Temple =

Confucian temple located in Wenxing Subdistrict of Xiangyin County, Hunan, China

- 湘阴文庙
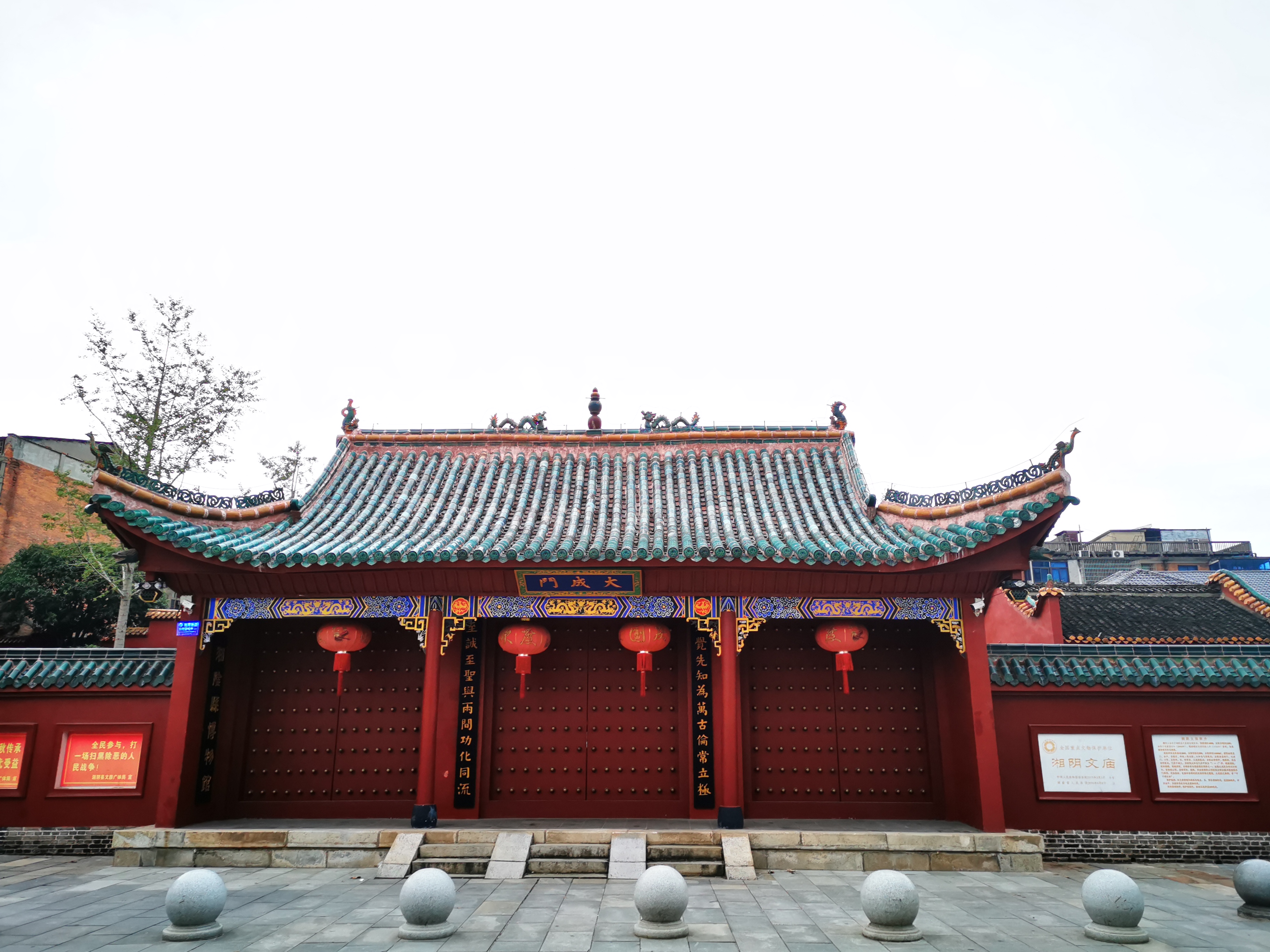
- Dacheng Gate

- Location within Hunan Location within China

Religion
- Affiliation: Confucianism
- Deity: Confucius

Location
- Location: Wenxing Subdistrict, Xiangyin County, Hunan, China
- Interactive map of Xiangyin Confucius Temple
- Coordinates: 28°40′24.67″N 112°52′35.14″E

Architecture
- Style: Chinese architecture
- Established: 1044
- Completed: 1744 (reconstruction)

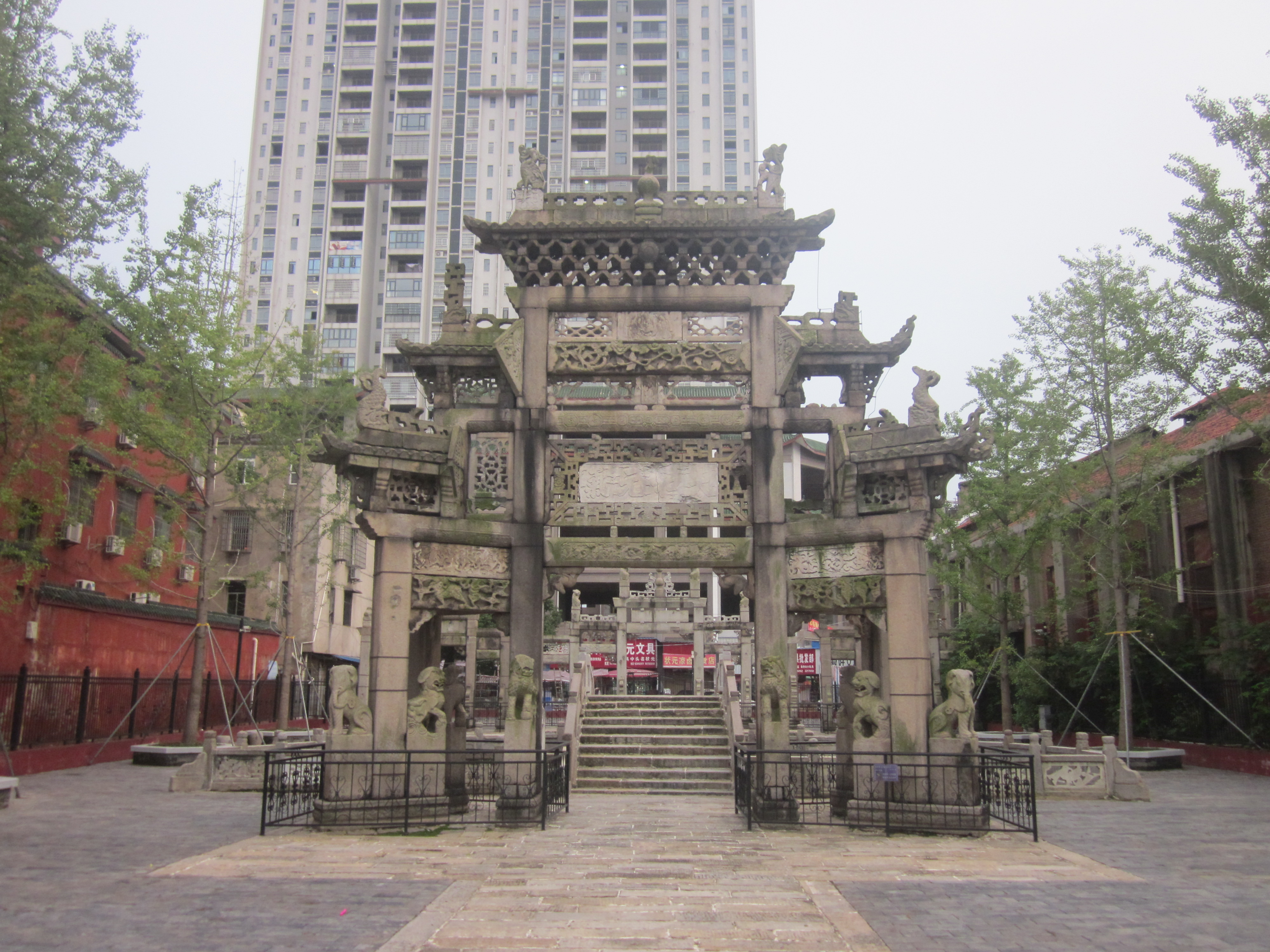
Lingxing Gate

Xiangyin Confucius Temple (simplified Chinese: 湘阴文庙; traditional Chinese: 湘陰文廟; pinyin: Xiāngyīn Wénmiào) is a Confucian temple located in Wenxing Subdistrict of Xiangyin County, Hunan, China.

== History ==
Xiangyin Confucius Temple was first built in 1044, during the Northern Song dynasty (960–1127), and went through many changes and repairs through the following dynasties. Most of the present structures in the temple were repaired or built in 1744, during the ruling of Qianlong Emperor of the Qing dynasty (1644–1911).

Xiangyin Confucius Temple has been classified as a provincial cultural unit in 1983. The most recent renovation was in 2009. In 2013, it was listed among the 7th batch of "Major National Historical and Cultural Sites in Hunan" by the State Council of China.

== Architecture ==
Xiangyin Confucius Temple covers an area of 14,000-square-metre (150,000 sq ft).

The Dacheng Hall is the main hall of the temple. It is 15-metre (49 ft) high, three rooms wide, three rooms deep and has double-eave gable and hip roofs.
