= Gan Lin =

Chinese politician

- 甘霖

Director of the State Anti-Monopoly Bureau
- In office 15 November 2021 – 10 November 2023
- Preceded by: New title

Personal details
- Born: October 1963 (age 62–63) Xiangyin County, Hunan, China
- Party: China Zhi Gong Party
- Education: Hunan Agricultural University; Huazhong Agricultural University; University of Nottingham

Gan Lin (Chinese: 甘霖; pinyin: Gān Lín; born October 1963) is a Chinese agronomist and politician who was the director of the State Anti-Monopoly Bureau from November 2021 to November 2023. She was a member of the 12th Standing Committee of the Chinese People's Political Consultative Conference and is a member of the 13th Standing Committee of the Chinese People's Political Consultative Conference.

== Biography ==
Gan was born in Xiangyin County, Yueyang, Hunan province in 1963. She received her bachelor's degree and master's degree from Hunan Agricultural University in 1984 and 1988, respectively. After graduation, she taught at the university. In February 1991, she entered Huazhong Agricultural University, where she earned her doctorate degree in 1993. She carried out postdoctoral research at the University of Nottingham in 1996 and then the Potato Research Center of Agriculture and Agri-Food Canada. She returned to China in 1999 and continued to teach at Hunan Agricultural University.

She joined the China Zhi Gong Party in January 1994, and began her political career in May 2001, when she was appointed deputy director of Hunan Provincial Agricultural Department. In January 2003, she rose to become vice governor of Hunan, and held that office until February 2011, when she was transferred to Beijing and appointed deputy director of the State Administration for Industry and Commerce. On December 5, 2017, she was proposed as a vice president of the 15th Central Committee of China Zhi Gong Party, one of China's eight political parties subservient to the Chinese Communist Party. In November 2021, she became director of the newly established State Anti-Monopoly Bureau.

Government offices
New title	Director of the State Anti-Monopoly Bureau; 2021–2023	Succeeded by TBD
