= Nanquan Temple =

Buddhist temple in Hunan, China

- 南泉寺
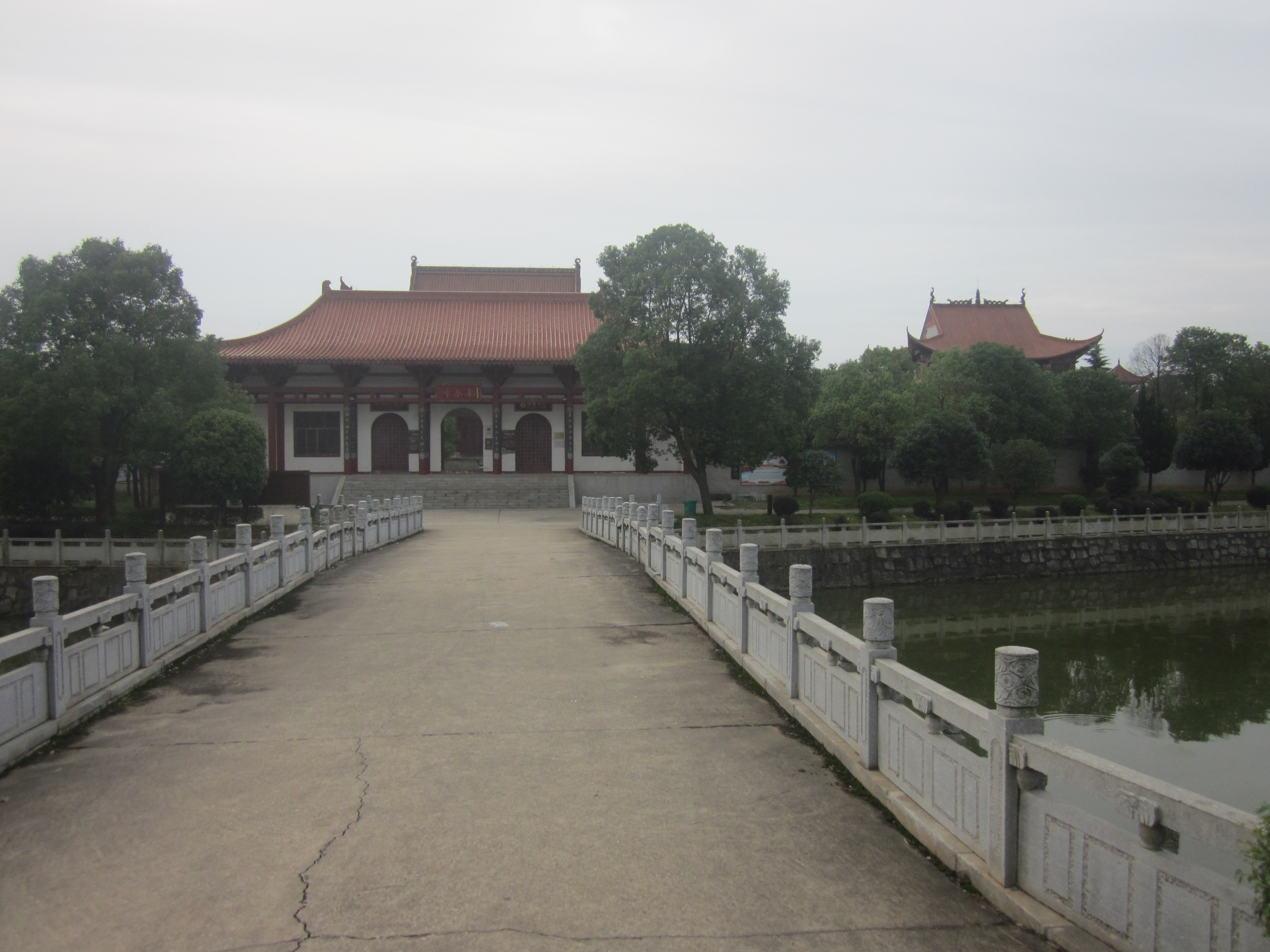
- A front view of Nanquan Temple.

- Location within Hunan Location within China

Religion
- Affiliation: Buddhism
- Sect: Linji school
- Leadership: Huaifan

Location
- Location: Xiangyin County, Hunan, China
- Interactive map of Nanquan Temple
- Coordinates: 28°39′00″N 112°53′24″E

Architecture
- Style: Chinese architecture
- Founder: Pu'an Yinsu
- Established: 1140
- Groundbreaking: October 2001 (reconstruction)
- Completed: 2003 (reconstruction)

Nanquan Temple (Chinese: 南泉寺; pinyin: Nánquán Sì) is a Buddhist temple located in Xiangyin County, Hunan, China.

== History ==
In 1140, in ruling of Emperor Gaozong of Song dynasty (960–1279), when Chan master Pu'an Yinsu passed by, he set up a Buddhist temple named "Shuanglin Chan Temple" (双林禅寺). Because the well is in the south of the temple, it was named "Nanquan Temple" (Nan means south and Quan means well).

The temple underwent three renovations in the Ming dynasty (1368–1644), respectively in the ruling of Yongle Emperor (1406) and in the 5th year of Zhengde period (1510) and in the reign of Jiajing Emperor (1551). The temple went to ruin by fire during the Manchu invasion of the 17th century.

In 1694, in the ruling of Kangxi Emperor of the Qing dynasty (1644–1911), Chan master Chongshan Deding (崇山德鼎) restored the temple and it had reached unprecedented heyday.

In 1930, Xiangyin County Middle School was established in the temple, some halls were used as classrooms. During the Second Sino-Japanese War, Xiangyin County Government came to Nanquan Temple twice to evade air raids.

After the founding of the Communist State, in 1952, Xiangyin County Middle School moved to downtown Xiangyin County, the wood tiles of some halls were removed as building materials. Other halls served as classrooms of Nanquan Primary School. Later, the Nanquan Primary School caught fire and left the temple in ruins. Renovations and rebuilding to the temple began in 2001 and were completed in 2003. In 2006, Huaifan (怀梵), a Buddhist monk and a member of the CPPCC Hunan Provincial Committee, served as abbot. In December 2014, it has been categorized as an AAA level tourist site by the China National Tourism Administration.

== Architecture ==
Now the complex include the following halls: Shanmen Hall, Mahavira Hall, Hall of Four Heavenly Kings, Hall of Guanyin, Bell tower, Drum tower, Hall of Kshitigarbha, Hall of Sangharama Palace, Hall of Guru, Dharma Hall, Free Life Pond, etc.

== Gallery ==
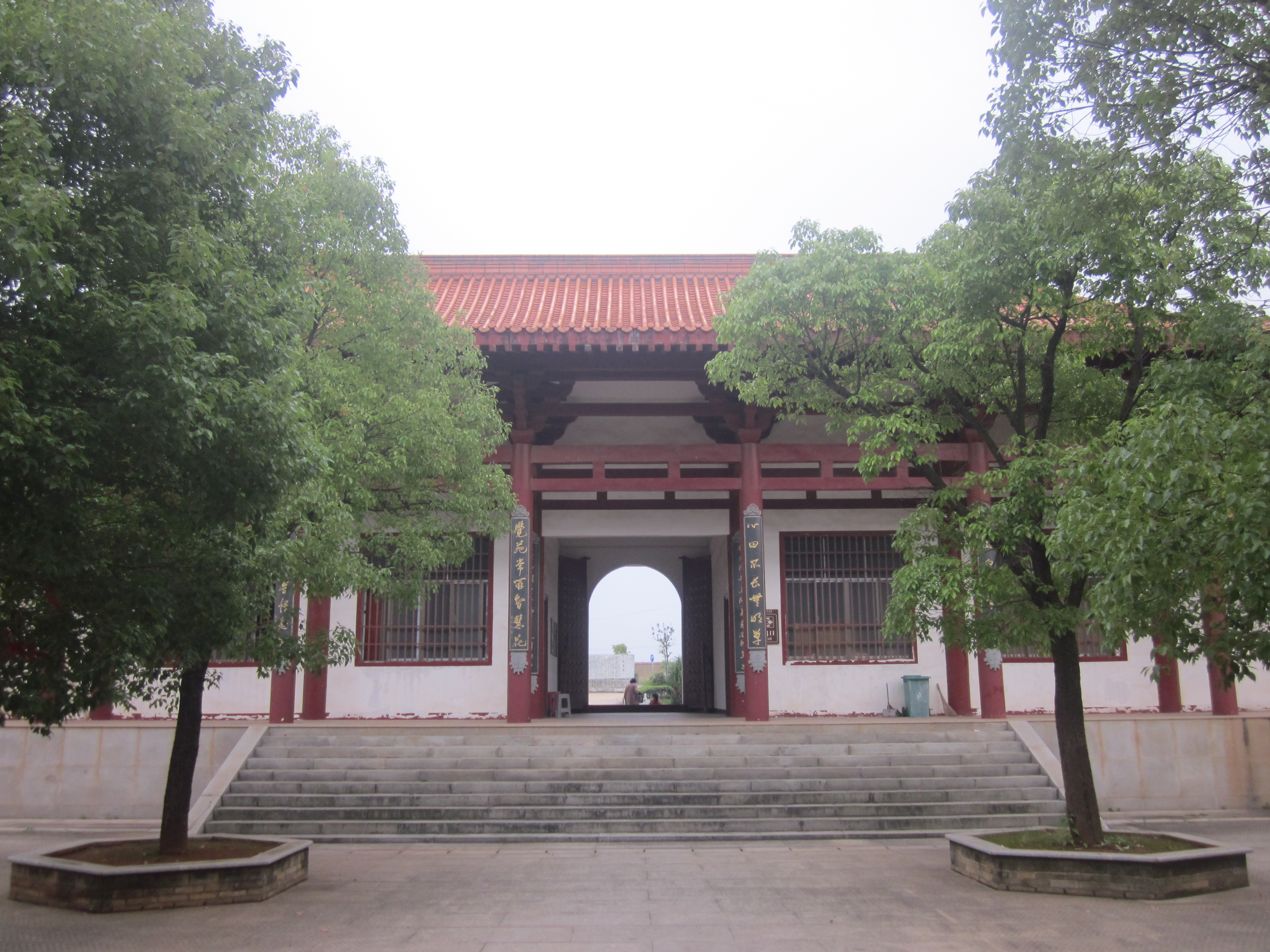
Shanmen Hall

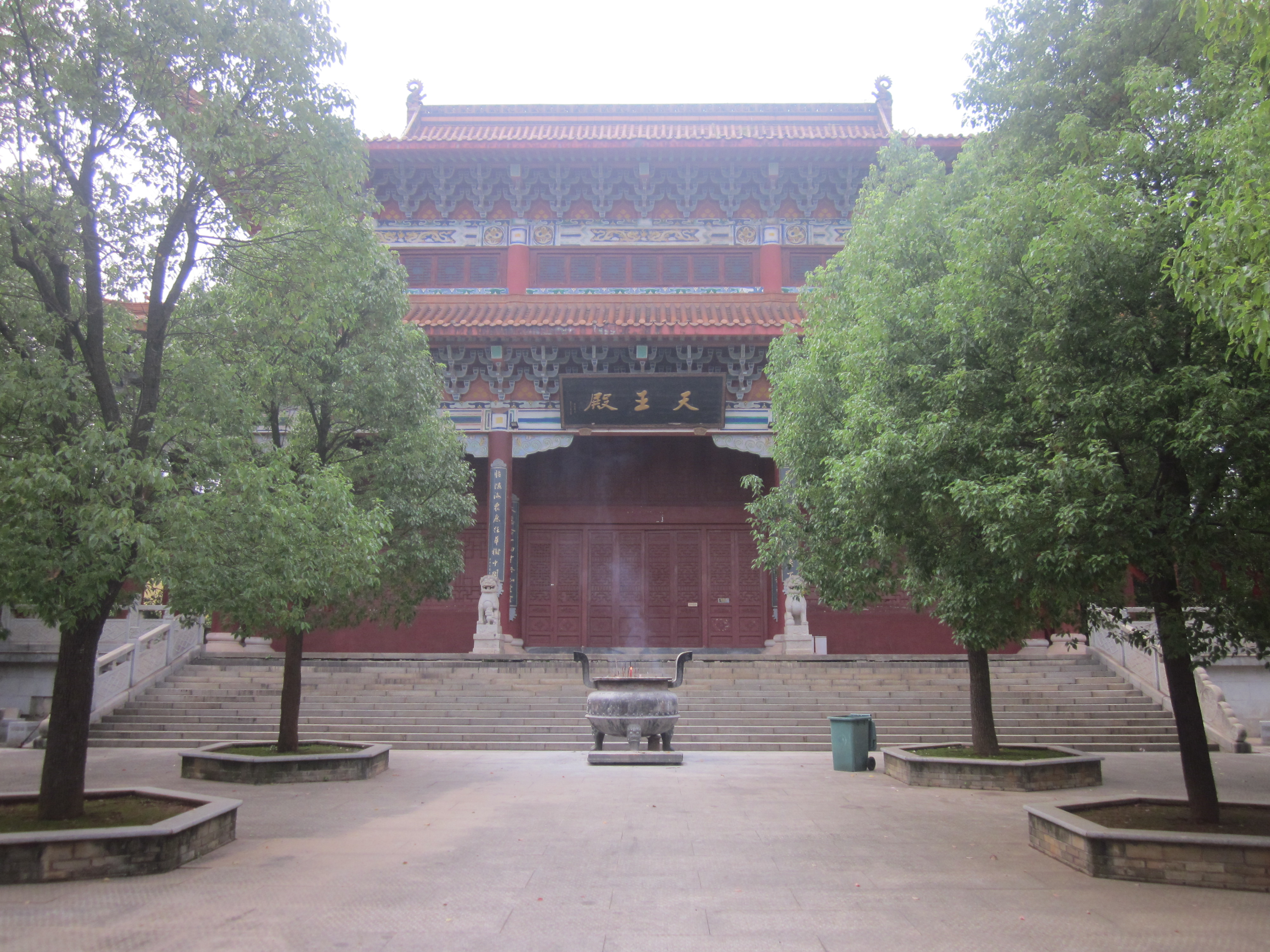
Four Heavenly Kings Hall

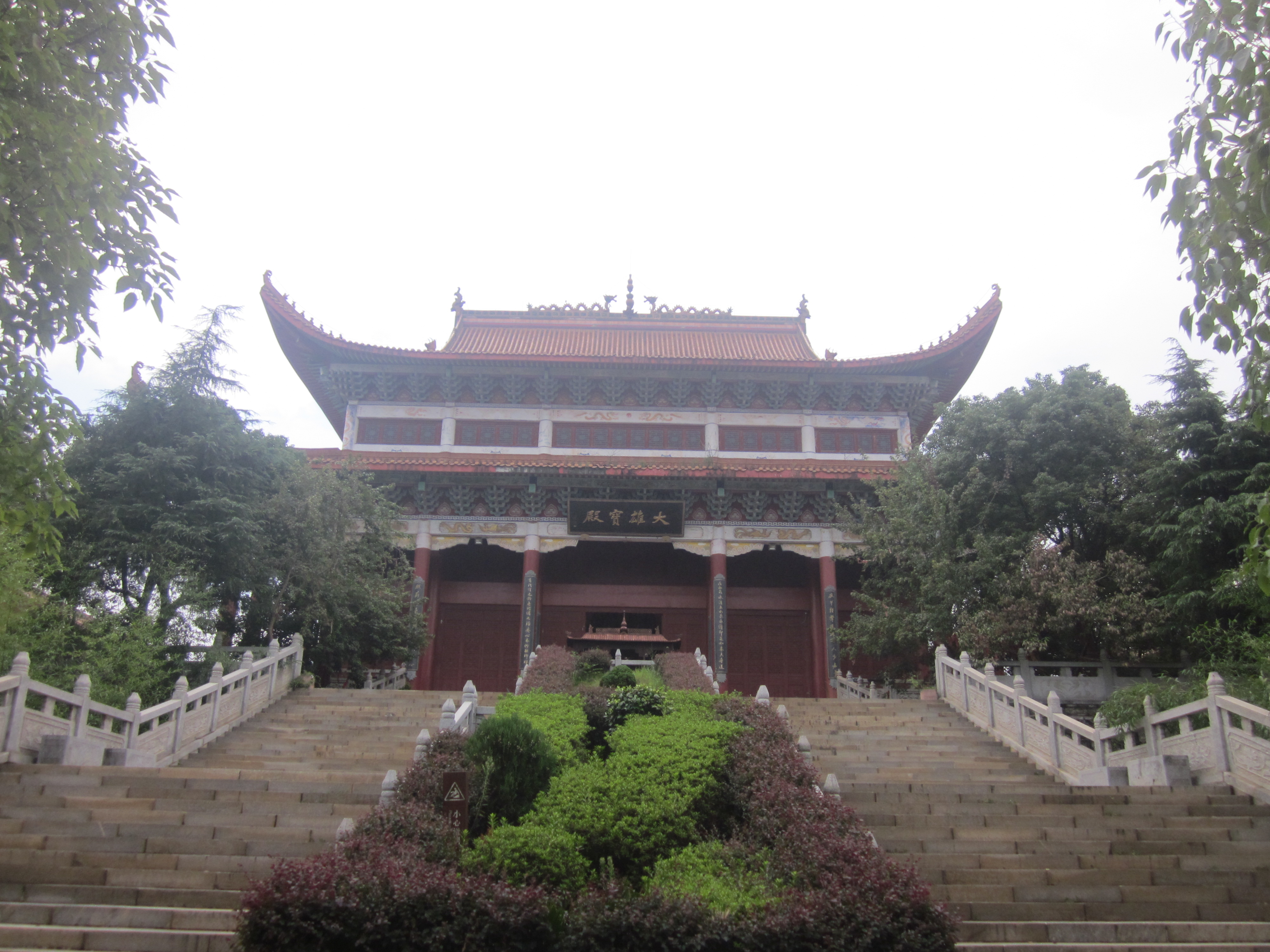
Mahavira Hall

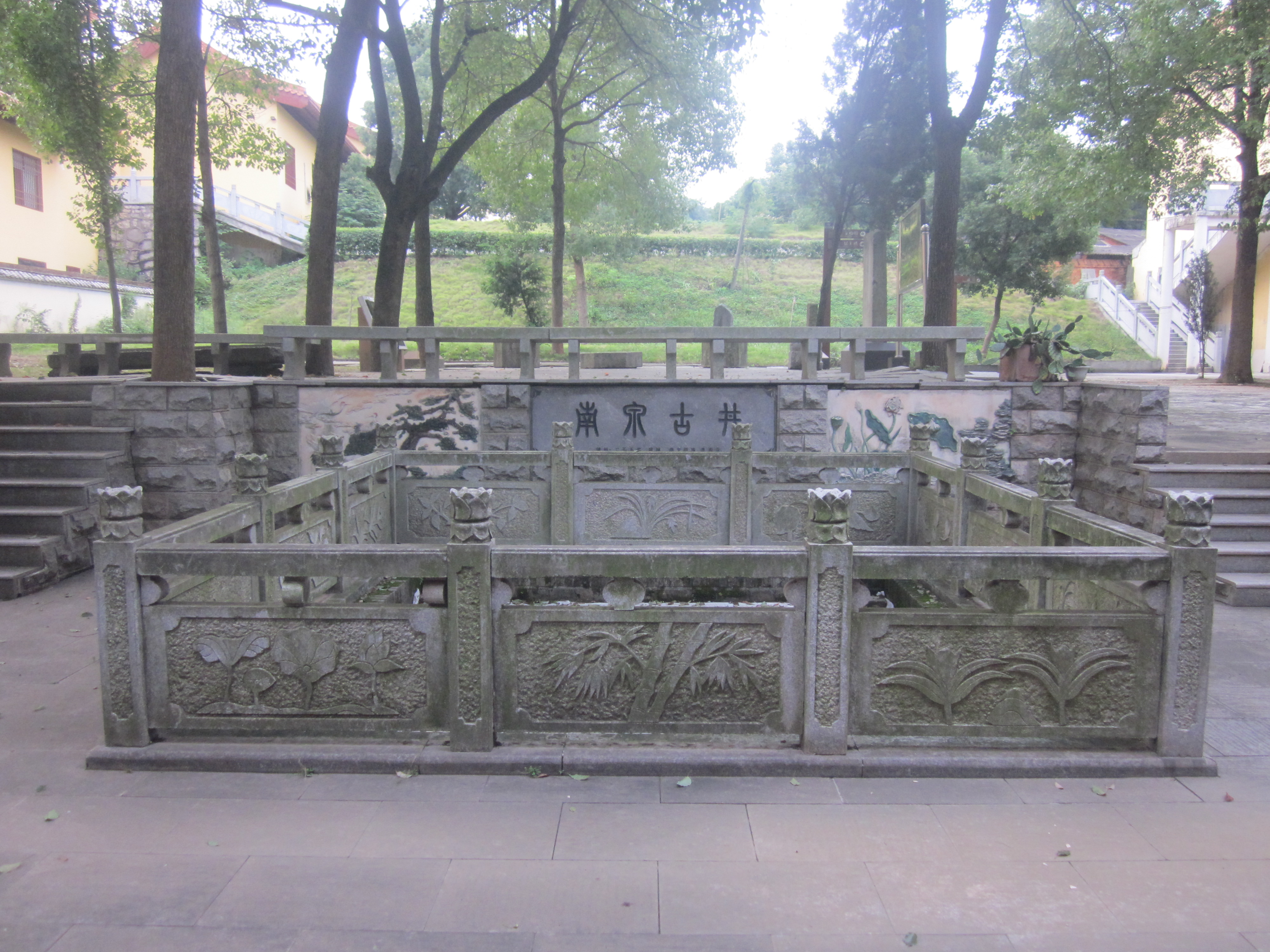
Nanquan Well

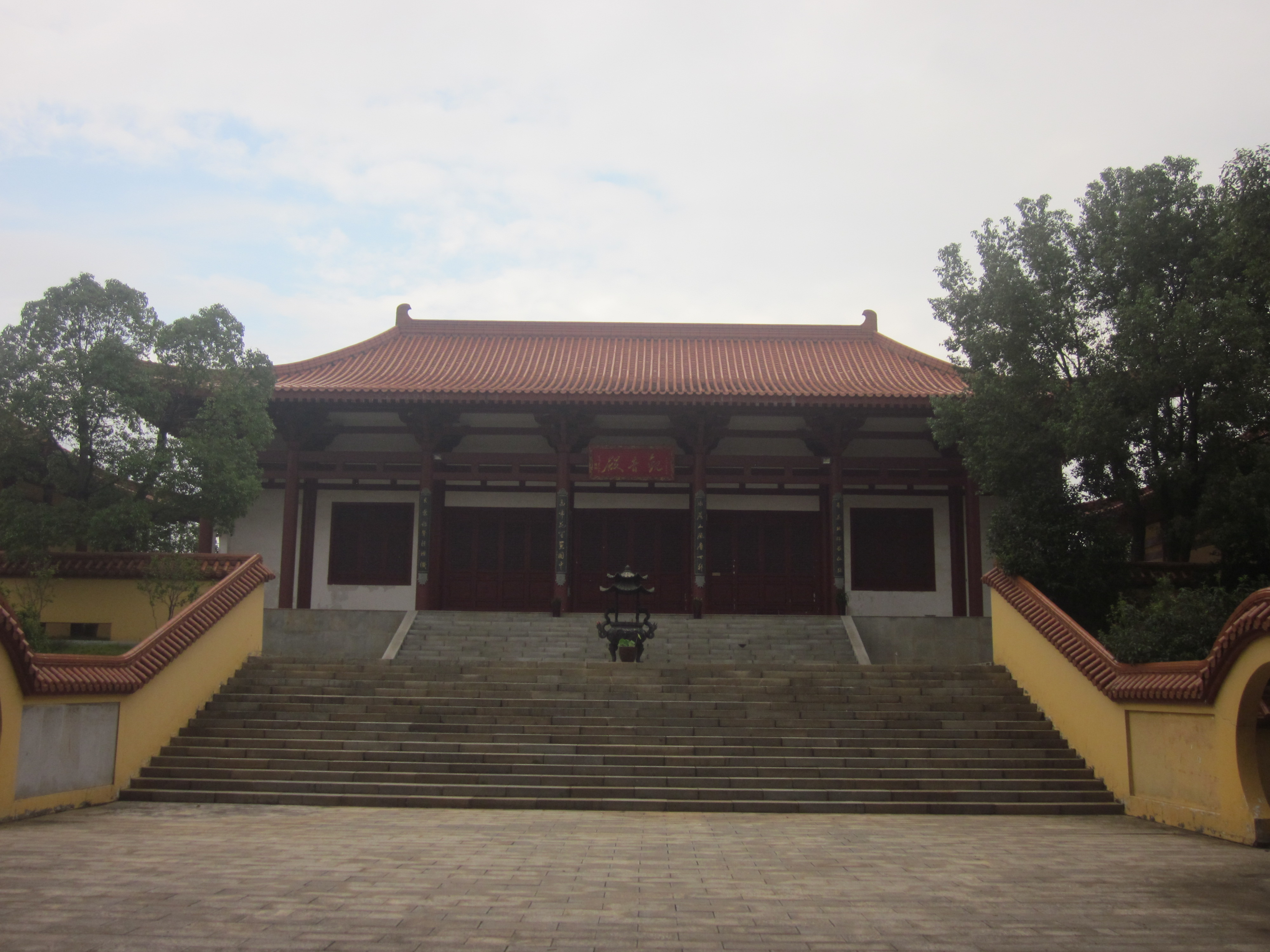
Guanyin Hall

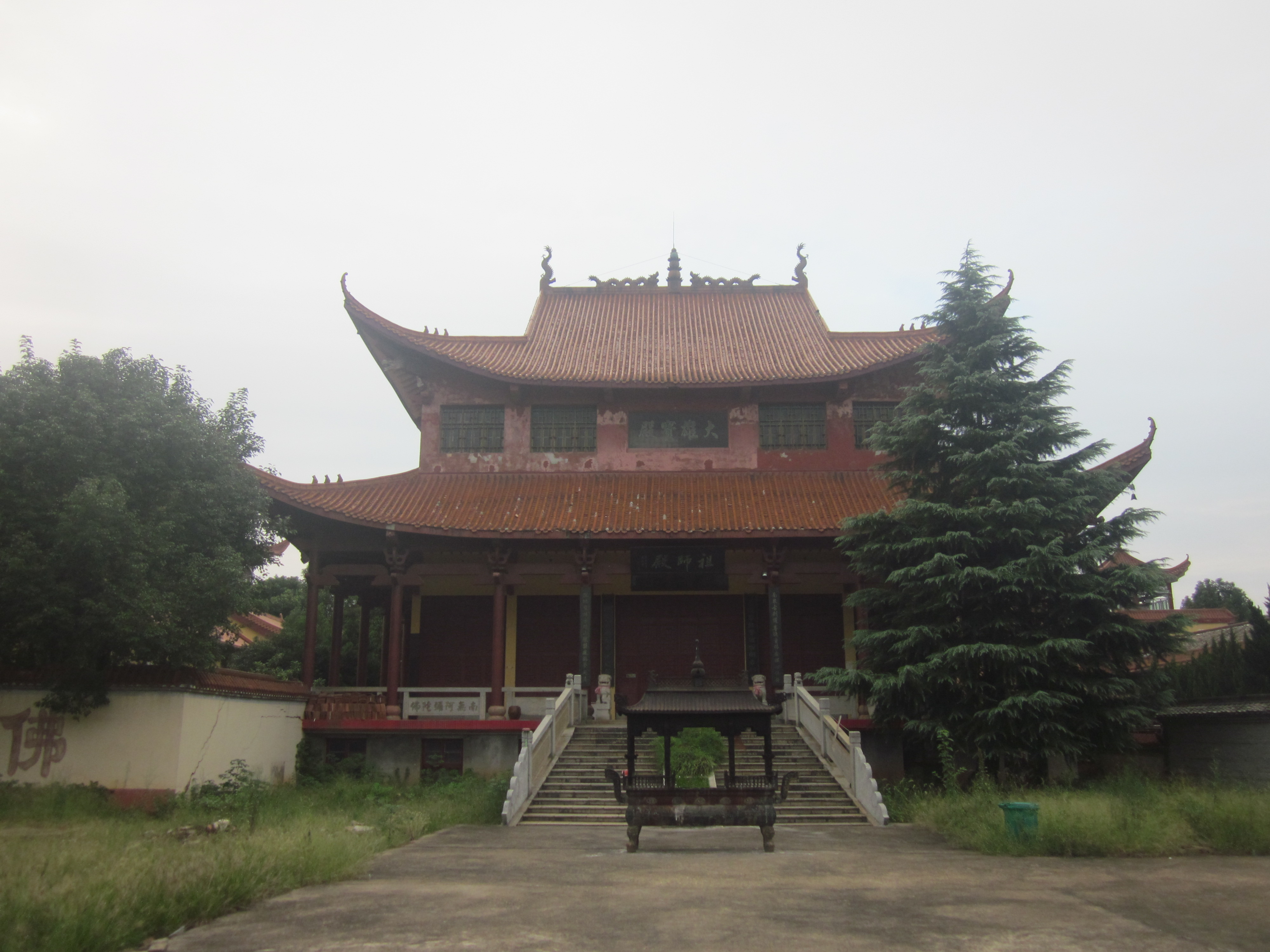
Guru Hall

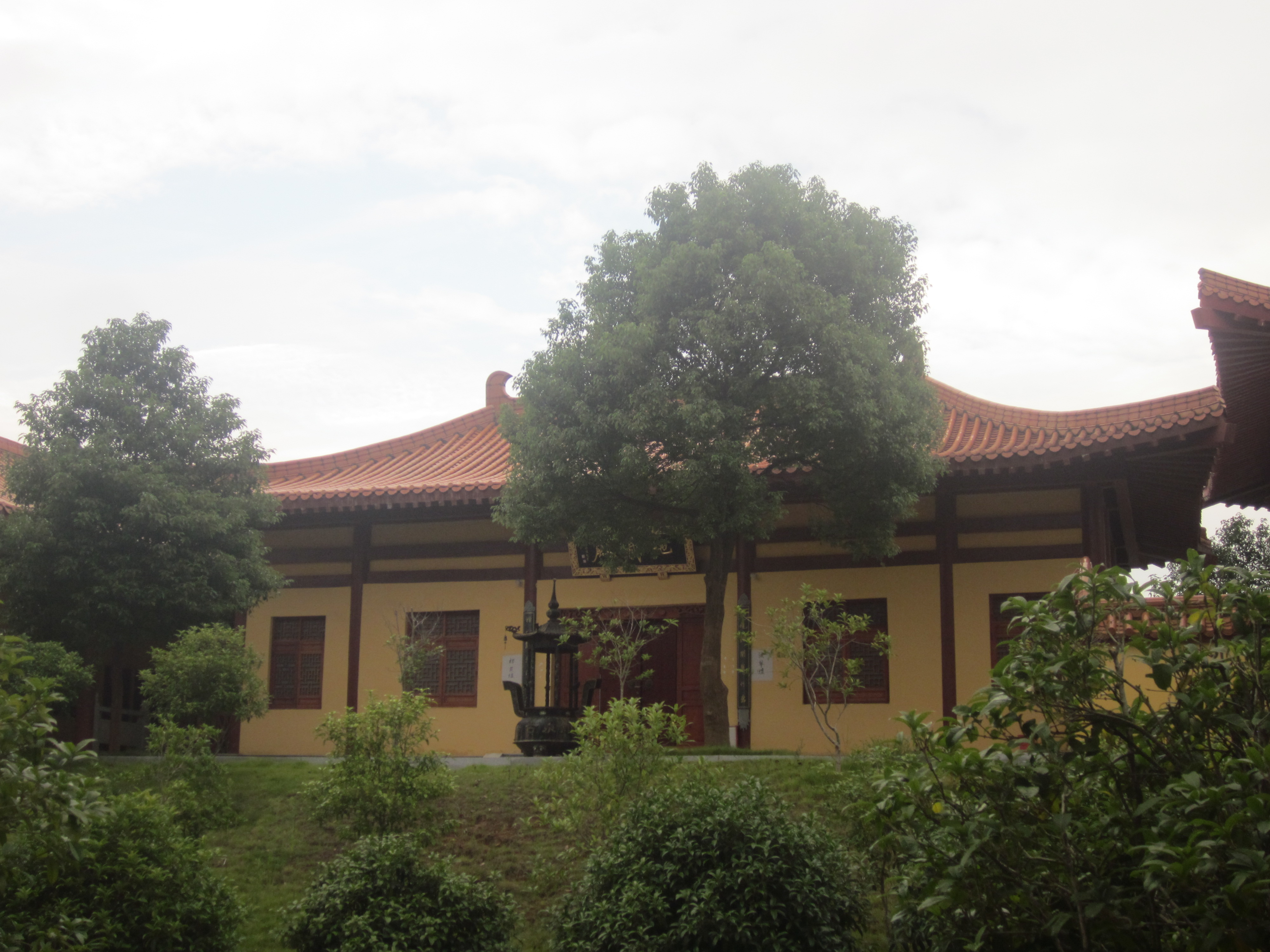
Kshitigarbha Hall
