= State Anti-Monopoly Bureau =

Chinese bureaucratic office

- 国家反垄断局
- Emblem of the People's Republic of China

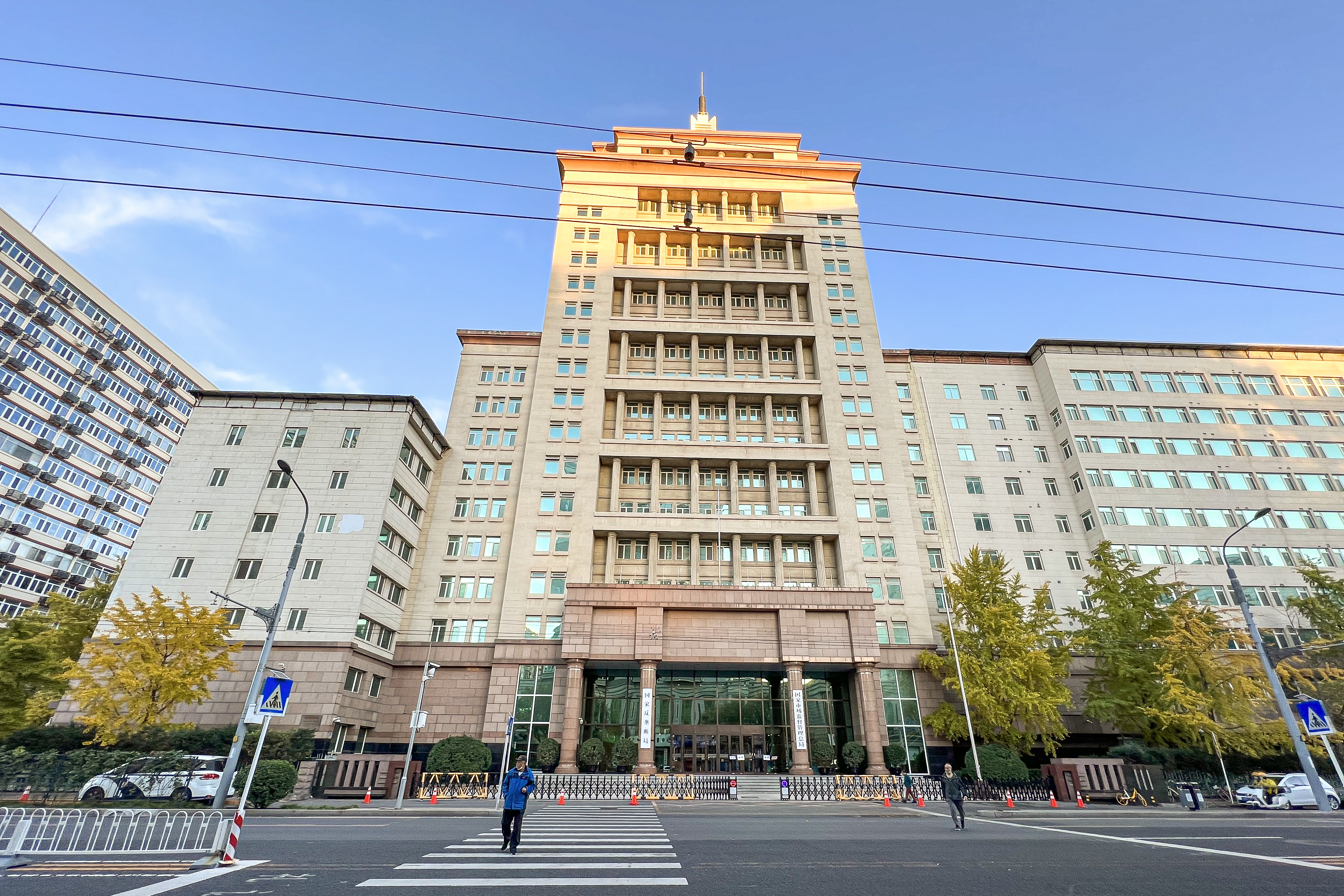

Agency overview
- Formed: 18 November 2021; 4 years ago
- Jurisdiction: China
- Headquarters: 8 East Sanlihe Rd, Xicheng District, Beijing
- Agency executive: Gan Lin, (Director)
- Parent department: State Administration for Market Regulation
- Parent agency: State Council
- Website: www.samr.gov.cn

State Anti-Monopoly Bureau
- Traditional Chinese: 國家反壟斷局
- Simplified Chinese: 国家反垄断局
Transcriptions
Standard Mandarin
- Hanyu Pinyin: Guójiā Fǎnlǒngduàn Zǒngjú

The State Anti-Monopoly Bureau (Chinese: 国家反垄断局) is an administrative agency under the State Council governing antitrust. It is an external name of the State Administration for Market Regulation.

== History ==
On 15 November 2021, Gan Lin was appointed director of the State Anti-Monopoly Bureau, which was formally established on November 18.

== List of directors ==
English name	Chinese name	Took office	Left office	Ref.
Gan Lin	甘霖	15 November 2021	10 November 2023	
