= Hunan Agricultural University =

Public agricultural university in Changsha, China

Coordinates: 28°10′54″N 113°05′06″E

- 湖南农业大学
- Motto: 朴诚 奋勉 求实 创新 (Chinese); Integritas Industria Veritas et Innovatio (Latin)
- Motto in English: Integrity Industry Verity and Innovation
- Type: Public
- Established: 1951; 75 years ago
- President: Zhou Xuexiao (邹学校)
- Faculty: 1,392 (December 2019)
- Undergraduates: 28,620 (December 2019)
- Postgraduates: 5,062 (December 2019)
- Location: Changsha, Hunan, China
- Campus: 2.27 km^{2} (560 acres)
- Website: www.hunau.edu.cn

Chinese name
- Traditional Chinese: 湖南農業大學
- Simplified Chinese: 湖南农业大学
Transcriptions
Standard Mandarin
- Hanyu Pinyin: Húnán Nóngyè Dàxué

Hunan Agricultural University (Chinese: 湖南农业大学; pinyin: Húnán Nóngyè Dàxué, commonly referred to as HAU or Nongda) is a public research university located in Changsha, Hunan, China.

Founded in 1951, the university was incorporated by two independent colleges under the name Hunan Agricultural College. Since Hunan was an agricultural powerhouse for the country, Mao Zedong, the founding father of the People's Republic of China, inscribed the school's name on its entrance sign. It changed to its current name in 1994.

The institution began with a focus on training students in various agricultural disciplines. After more than a half century's development, the school has evolved into a renowned comprehensive university. In 1978, HAU started to award master's degrees. As of 2007, more than 50,000 students from 31 provinces across China study there, including 24,000 undergraduates, 26,000 continuing education students, 3000 graduate and doctoral students.

== Organization and administration ==
The current president of the university is Fu Shaohui, who has served since 2014. The university has 7 vice presidents.

A semester system is used – i.e., the academic year is divided into two terms. The first (fall) semester lasts from September to January; the second (spring) semester from February to June. Each consists of 18 teaching weeks, finals are generally held in week 19.

Hunan Agricultural University is divided into 20 colleges:

- College of Agriculture
- College of Animal Science
- College of Biosafety Science and Technology
- College of Bioscience
- College of Business
- College of Continuing Education
- College of Economics
- College of Engineering
- College of Food Science
- College of Foreign Languages
- College of Horticulture and Landscape
- College of Humanities and Social Sciences
- College of Information Science
- College of Natural Resources and Environment
- College of Science
- College of Sports & Arts
- Oriental College of Science & Technology
- College of Education (Teachers College)
- College of Veterinary Medicine

== Academics ==
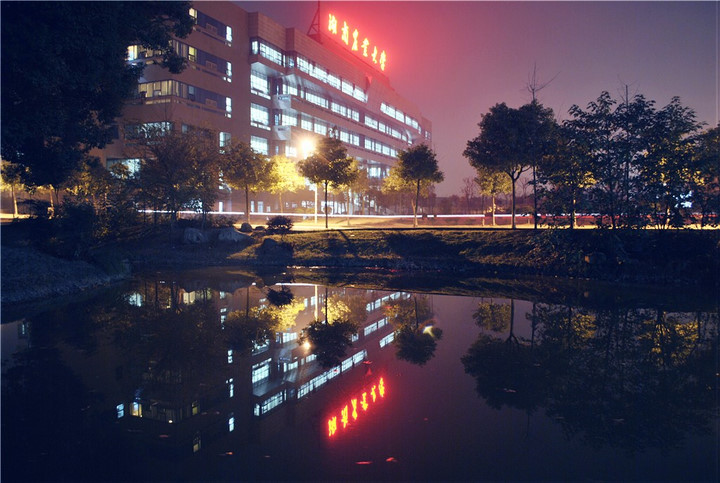
night view of the Library

HUNAU offers 69 bachelors, 101 masters and 52 doctorate degree programs. Also, it contains 7 postdoctoral research institutes, 1 national research center and 3 national engineering laboratories.

There are 1198 full-time faculty, including 3 fellows of Chinese Academy of Engineering, 226 doctoral advisors, 432 master advisors, 234 professors and 515 associate professors. Among them, 4 were awarded the title of National Outstanding Experts. The university also participates in the Changjiang Scholars Program, 100 Talents Program and Recruitment Program of Global Experts.

Since the ninth five-year plan, HAU has been awarded 182 prizes, 13 of them were the national prizes, 169 were ministerial or provincial level prizes. In recent years, the university has undertaken over 145 research projects at national level and 918 projects at provincial level.

In 2007, the university had 16 enterprises of sole proprietorship or proprietorship. The total fund is 40 million RMB, and the annual income reaches 109 million RMB.

== Rankings and reputation ==
As of 2023, the Academic Ranking of World Universities, also known as ShanghaiRanking, placed HAU # 801-900th globally. Hunan Agricultural University is ranked # 113 in China, # 293 in Asia and # 1060 th globally by the U.S. News & World Report Best Global University Ranking. The university ranked #971 in the world and #171 in China by the Center for World University Rankings 2025. The university ranked # 809 in the world out of nearly 30,000 universities worldwide by the University Rankings by Academic Performance 2023–2024.

The 2024 CWTS Leiden Ranking ranked Hunan Agricultural University at # 840 in the world based on their publications for the period 2019–2022.

Overall, Hunan Agricultural University was ranked among the top 1100 universities worldwide according to several major international universities rankings.

=== Research and Subject Rankings ===
As of 2022, Hunan Agricultural University ranked the # 76-100 globally in the Academic Ranking of World Universities (ARWU) and 127th globally in the U.S. News & World Report Best Global University Ranking for "Agricultural Sciences".

2023 Subjects Ranking	Global Ranking by ARWU
Agricultural Sciences	51–75
Food Science & Technology	51–75
Veterinary Sciences	76–100
Biotechnology	151–200
Environmental Science & Engineering	201–300
Chemical Engineering	401–500

2022 Subjects Ranking	Global Ranking by US News
Food Science & Technology	113
Agricultural Sciences	127
Plant and Animal Science	259
Environment/Ecology	420
Chemistry	686

== Campus ==
The university is situated in the eastern suburbs of Changsha, with views of the city skyline. The Nongda area is comparable to a college town or even an edge city and many residents seldom go to downtown because of heavy traffic and overcrowding on bus route 317. However, with the opening of metro line 2, going to down and traveling through Changsha has become a breeze. The university has a single campus, botoded on the north by the busy thoroughfare – Renmin Road (East); on the south by Liuyang River; on the east by lakes and the west by farmland.

The campus has eleven numbered academic buildings and several administrative buildings. There are four large-scale residence areas: Fengze, Zhilan, Donghu, and Jin'an. Each area has about a dozen halls. The residence areas are coed but halls are single sex. Most of the rooms in Fengze, Donghu and Jin'an accommodate four people with basic facilities. Lights out time is at 11:00 p.m. in all areas for undergraduates. Some students, both undergrad and postgrad, have chosen to rent in apartment buildings adjacent to campus for better convenience and environment.

== Notable people ==
=== Alumni ===
- Jizhong Zhou, 1981 – Presidential Professor, University of Oklahoma; Research Scientist at Oak Ridge National Laboratory
- Gan Lin, 1981 – former dean; Deputy Governor of Hunan Province
- Deng Xiaogang, 1985 – Deputy Party Secretary, Sichuan province
- Chen Run'er – born 1957, Governor of Henan Province
- He Jiatie – born 1961, discipline official
- Ma Yong – born 1957, politician, former party chief of Yiyang

=== Faculty ===
- Yuan Longping – father of hybrid rice
- Mao Zhiyong – party secretary of Jiangxi Province
- Hu Dujing – plant physiologist
