= Northeastern Jiangxi Soviet =

Chinese Soviet (c. 1928–1934)

Northeastern Jiangxi Soviet 赣东北苏维埃
- Revolutionary base area of the Chinese Soviet Republic
- 1928–1934
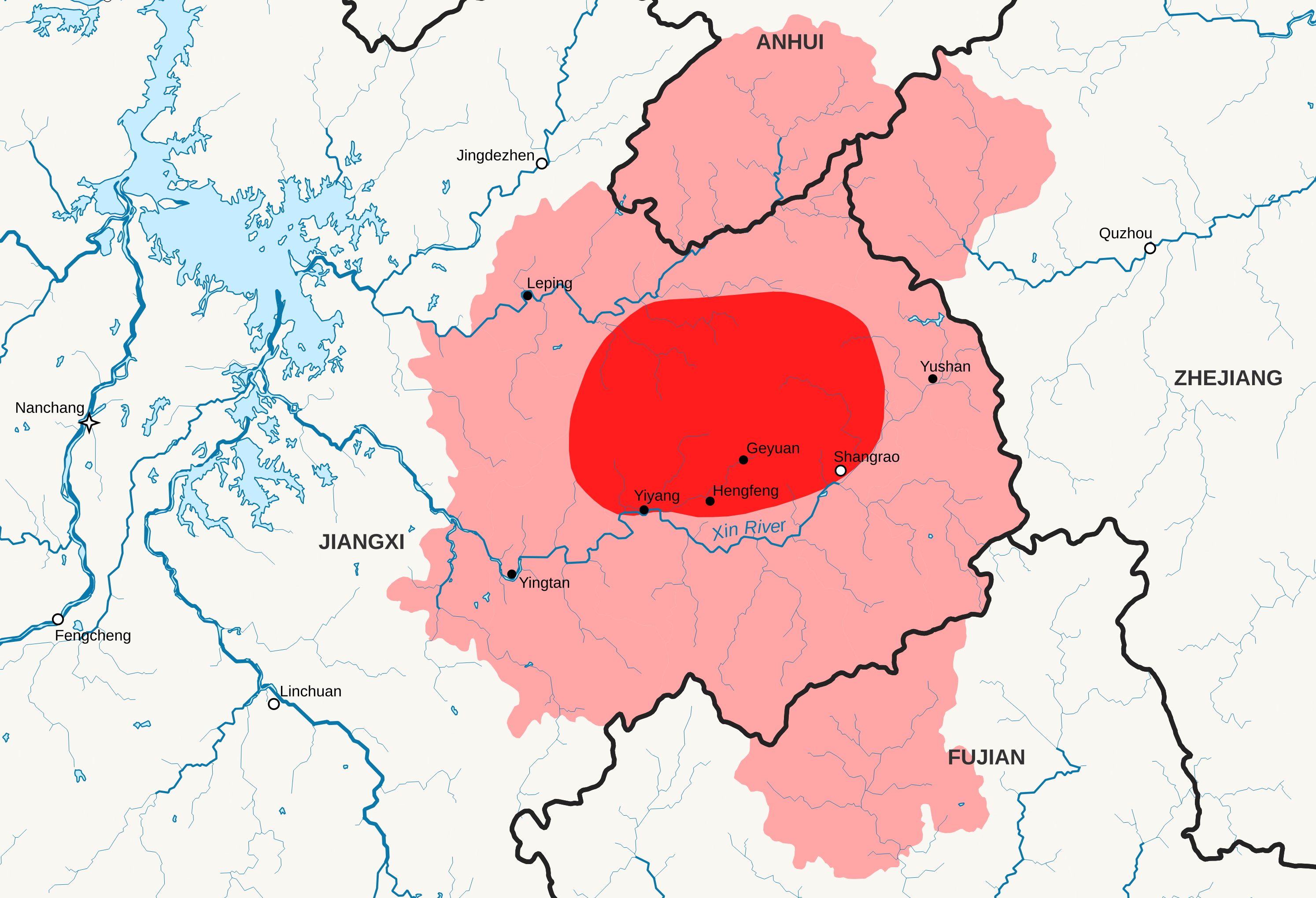
- Map of the Northeast Jiangxi Soviet and surrounding region
- Capital: Geyuan
- Government
- Secretary
  - 1928-1931: Fang Zhimin
  - 1931-1933: Wan Yongcheng; Zeng Hongyi
  - 1933-1934: Fang Zhimin
- Historical era: Chinese Civil War
  - Established: 1928
  - Disestablished: 1934

The Northeastern Jiangxi Soviet (Chinese: 赣东北苏维埃; pinyin: Gàndōngběi Sūwéiāi), first known as the Xin River Soviet and later as the Minzhegan Soviet, was a soviet governed by the Chinese Communist Party (CCP) that existed between 1928 and 1934 as part of the Chinese Soviet Republic. The core of the Soviet included the counties of Chong'an in Fujian, Kaihua in Zhejiang, Wuyuan in Anhui, and Yiyang and Hengfeng in Jiangxi. It was founded and led for much of its existence by Fang Zhimin and was the base of the Tenth Red Army.

== History ==
=== Background ===
Northeast Jiangxi is a rugged and relatively remote region centered around the Xin River, near where it empties into Poyang Lake. The region borders three other provinces, Fujian, Zhejiang, and Anhui, and together the whole cross-border area is known as Minzhewan'gan. (Note: The name comes from the Chinese abbreviations for each province: Fujian (Mǐn), Zhejiang (Zhè), Anhui (Wǎn), and Jiangxi (Gàn).) The economy of the region relied on agriculture and handicrafts, and had been badly hit by foreign competition in the late nineteenth and early twentieth centuries. As a result, northeast Jiangxi became the home to bandits, triads, and secret societies. The elites were divided between large, absentee landlords living in the city and smaller landlords living in towns or among the peasantry. Starting in the early 1900s, elite families sent their sons to bigger cities to study. Many of these students were radicalized by their education and experience outside Jiangxi and joined one of the two emerging political parties, the Chinese Communist Party (CCP) and the Kuomintang (KMT).

In the mid-1920s, the CCP and KMT formed an alliance known as the First United Front against the warlords that governed China. The United Front sent cadres to northeast Jiangxi to organize the peasant associations in support of the anti-warlord movement. These cadres were mostly natives of the region who used their family connections to gain recruits. (Note: Clan elders strongly disapproved of their efforts to undermine traditional power structures, but tolerated them because of family loyalty and skepticism that they would ultimately succeed.) This was essential for starting the movement, but it caused the leaders of other family lineages to see the Communists as rivals for influence. Only after the peasant associations had built a reputation for standing up to landlord abuses did these rival clans begin to join. When the Northern Expedition brought the region of the United Front's military control, the organizers rapidly expanded their activities. The peasant associations became much larger and more assertive. They burned land deeds and debt records, and against the wishes of the cadres, executed particularly hated landlords. In some cases, they even took control of tax collection and dispensing justice. (Note: Not all of the new peasant associations equally successful–many inexperienced organizers who were "still preoccupied with urban politics" created top-down institutions that barely involved the peasants.) This period of growth came to an end when in April 1927 when KMT general Chiang Kai-shek led the right wing of the party to turn against the Communists. Over the next few months Jiangxi was taken over by the right wing of the KMT. After the Nanchang Uprising failed to retake control of Jiangxi's capital (and similar attempts to take power in cities across the country also failed), the CCP decided to switch to a rural revolutionary strategy.

=== Creating the Soviet ===
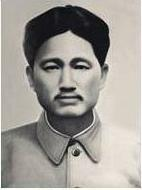
Fang Zhimin was the most important leader of the Northeast Jiangxi Soviet.

In the fall of 1927, a number of CCP cadres arrived in northeast Jiangxi to rebuild the revolutionary peasant movement. The most important of these were Fang Zhimin, Huang Dao, and Shao Shiping. All three had helped lead the United Front's organizing efforts in the region. Now forced to operate covertly, the Communists adopted the methods of traditional secret societies. They organized the sympathetic peasants of each village into a secret cell, inducting new initiates at ceremonies where "incense was burned, obeisance made, and chicken's blood drunk, [with] the members swearing to stand by each other until death." They formed militias to battle gangs hired by local landlords and the independent bandits who roamed the countryside. They were able to recruit some of the bandits, and they provided valuable combat experience. In November 1927, Communists from five northeastern Jiangxi counties met to plan a revolt. They elected Fang Zhimin head of an organizational committee to lead the effort. The first round of uprisings took place in late 1927 and early 1928. They involved only a few hundred men armed with "two and a half rifles" they captured from a local police garrison. They were also poorly coordinated, varied widely in scale and aims, and were mostly put down by an influx of Nationalist troops. Communist guerillas retreated into the hills and slowly retook territory. At the Fangsheng Hill conference in June 1928, they decided to attempt to create a revolutionary base area similar to what Mao Zedong and Zhu De had created in southern Jiangxi. They shifted their strategy from confronting the Nationalist troops to focusing on the landlord-backed gangs. Soviets were established in villages across the region.

In November 1928 or February 1929, the Communist-controlled areas in northeast Jiangxi were formally united as the "Xin River Soviet", under a Special Committee chaired by Fang Zhimin. The Soviet spanned ten counties and had a population of 40,000, according to the official Communist estimate. In September 1929, the name was changed to the "Northeast Jiangxi Soviet". From 1928 through 1930, the Communist guerrilla forces fought and defeated the gangs organized by local landlords. In 1930, these forces were formally organized as the 10th Red Army with Zhou Jianping as commander-in-chief. The 10th Red Army successfully repulsed two encirclement campaigns against the Soviet in 1930 and 1931.

=== Reforms and leadership conflicts ===
The three key policies of the Northeast Jiangxi Soviet were land reform, rent reduction, and abolition of all debts. However, serious redistribution of land did not begin until 1929 and 1930, because before that point it was judged more important not to alienate the minor gentry. To keep the economy functioning during the redistribution of land, the Soviet government prohibited the export of rice and established taxes, banks, and small handicrafts factories. These efforts were largely successful. Handicrafts thrived and agricultural production increased twenty percent between 1932 and 1933.

Land redistribution was popular among the poor peasants, but it generated resistance from small landlords and wealthy peasants. As mentioned, some of these local elites hired gangs to attack Red Army outposts. However, the majority relied on quiet sabotage. They often volunteered for offices in the local Soviet government in order to administer its policies in the way that hurt their interests the least. Even some party members (who were often recruited from the minor gentry) began to show discomfort with carrying out redistributionist policies. In 1930, the policies of prominent CCP Central Committee member Li Lisan, collectively known as the "Li Lisan line", began to be implemented in Northeast Jiangxi. Historian Stephen Averill argues that these new policies had the effect of strengthening the anti-land reform faction. In December of that year, a split between the moderate and radical factions took place in the Central Soviet, known as the Futian incident. The result was a victory for the more radical faction led by Mao Zedong.

In late 1931, the radical faction now in control of the CCP sent Wan Yongcheng and Zeng Hongyi to replace Fang Zhimin as leaders of the Northeast Jiangxi Soviet. (Note: For the fact that Fang Zhimin was still in charge until November: Kim 1974, p. 43; For the names of the men who replaced him: Benton 1992, pp. 198) From 1932 to 1933 they initiated purges against the moderate, anti-land reform faction and introduced Mao Zedong's mass line. Historians take differing views on the effect of these purges. Ilpyong Kim argues that the Soviet "was consolidated and strengthened" by removing Party members who had been recruited from the rural gentry and were hesitant to implement radical land reform. According to George Benton, the extreme leftism of the new leaders "ravaged army morale and alienated villagers from the Party". Stephen Averill takes something of a middle ground. He concludes that, although costly, the purges "firmly established in the Chinese Revolution the policies of mass mobilization and radical socioeconomic change that played a major role in the eventual Communist victory."

=== Military confrontations with the Nationalists ===
Nationalist encirclement campaigns against the soviets in southern China became more aggressive starting in 1932. The Northeastern Jiangxi Soviet had mixed success defending itself against these attacks, losing some territory but also gaining new subordinate soviets in Fujian and Zhejiang. As a result, the name of the Soviet was changed for the last time to the "Minzhegan Soviet". (Note: The name comes from the Chinese abbreviations for the three provinces: Fujian (Mǐn), Zhejiang (Zhè), and Jiangxi (Gàn).) In early 1933, the Tenth Red Army was ordered south to help defend the Central Soviet in southern Jiangxi. This was unpopular with the soldiers and citizens in northeastern Jiangxi. Despite efforts of the Soviet to organize a new Tenth Red Army, over the course of the year the Soviet lost more ground to the Nationalists. In December, Fang Zhimin was reappointed head of the Minzhegan Soviet and began using a more mobile defensive strategy. This failed to stop the military defeats of the Soviet. On July 9, 1934, the Central Soviet sent a relief expedition on a "northern expedition" to Minzhegan that included many of the soldiers from the old Tenth Army. This force cut a wide arc through rural Fujian, Zhejiang, and Anhui on an indirect path to Minzhegan. On its way, it captured arms from Nationalist garrisons, "electrified local units of the party", and distributed thousands of leaflets explaining why China needed to resist Japanese aggression. Calling itself the "Anti-Japanese Vanguard", this army eventually reached Minzhegan in late October. The new and old Tenth Red Armies were merged into one unit under Liu Chouxi, numbering about 8,000-10,000 men.

The next month, the Central Committee in Ruijin ordered the reunited Tenth Army to head north into southern Anhui to set up a Soviet there. They were routed by a Nationalist army of over 200,000 under Wang Yaowu. The remaining forces marched on a winding journey through mountainous terrain and took heavy casualties. On January 29, 1935, Fang Zhimin and the remnants of the Tenth Red Army were captured by the Nationalists. Fang Zhimin was imprisoned in Nanchang and executed on August 6, 1935.

== Administration ==
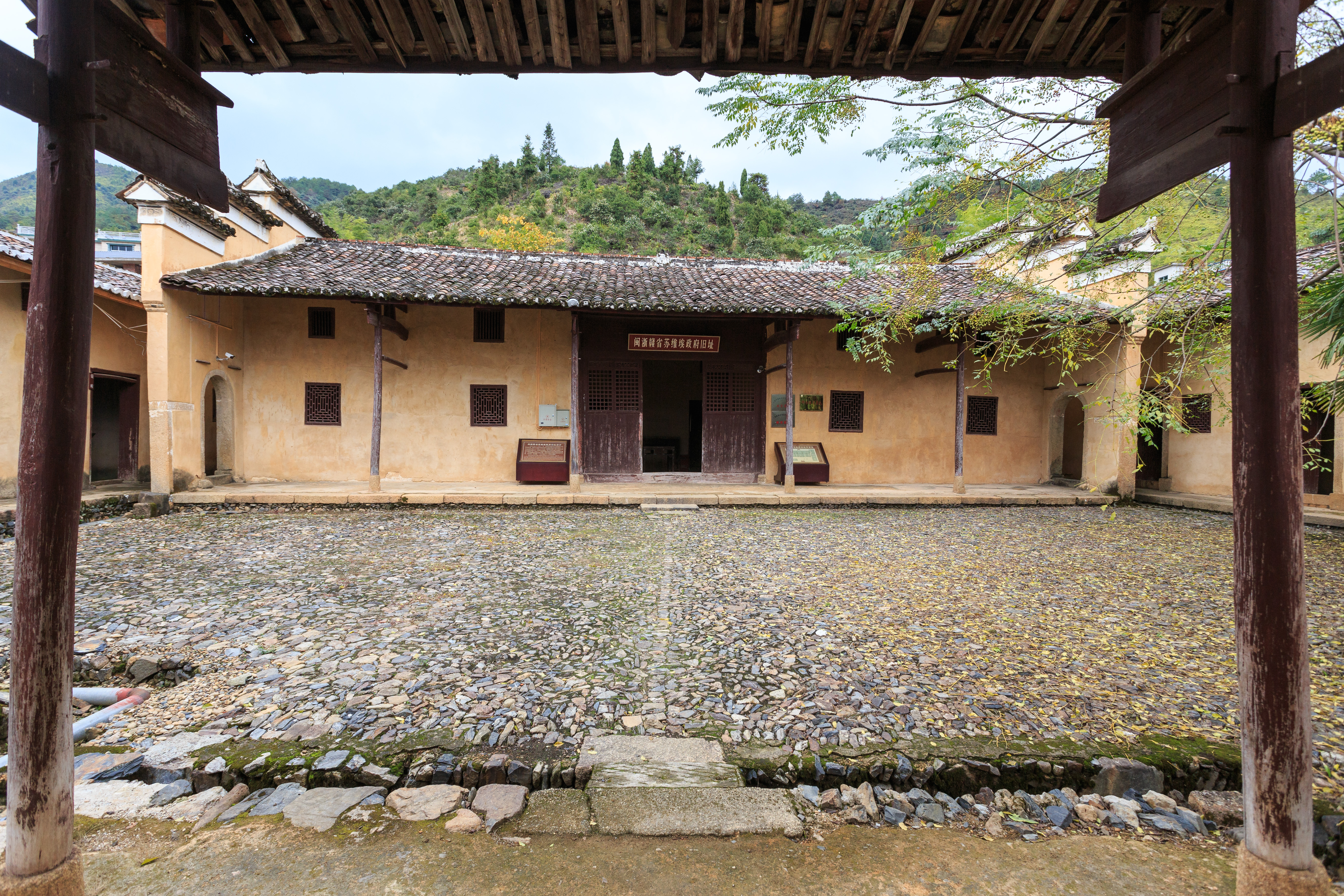
The administrative headquarters of the Soviet from 1932 to 1934, in Geyuan.

The Northeast Jiangxi Soviet was made up of local soviets organized at the county level. Each soviet was organized slightly differently, although all had some for of mass participation. Administrative power in each county soviet was divided between the Communist Party, the Soviet government, and the military affairs committee. These organizations were not always well-coordinated with each other, which a report drafted by the CCP attributed to a lack of trained cadres at the county level. At the time, the Communist leadership considered the Northeastern Jiangxi Soviet to be one of the best-run soviets. Mao Zedong said in 1934 that "the comrades in Northeast Jiangxi are doing the most creative work in building soviet institutions... they are certainly the model soviets."

== Geography ==
The core of the Soviet area were the counties of Chong'an in Fujian, Kaihua in Zhejiang, Wuyuan in Anhui, (Note: Wuyuan county is now part of Jiangxi province, but was part of Anhui at the time.) and Yiyang and Hengfeng in Jiangxi. At its official founding, it included five additional counties. In 1932, the Soviet government set up a headquarters in Geyuan, a small town in Hengfeng county. Eventually, the Soviet expanded to include a total of 16 counties. (Note: Kim and Dillon agree that the soviet included sixteen counties, although neither gives a clear list of which these were. Sheel and Kim also give a more extensive list of counties that were apparently under Soviet control at one point or another. These were: Jiangxi: Dexing, Dongxiang, Doujiang, Fuliang, Guangfeng, Guixi, Hengfeng, Hukou, Jinxi, Leping, Pengze, Poyang, Shangrao, Wannian, Yanshan, Yiyang, Yugan, Yujiang, and Yushan Anhui: Dongliu, Jing, Qimen, Qiubo, Taiping, Wuyuan, and Xiuning. Zhejiang: Jiangshan, Jingning, Kaihua, Pingyang, Qingtian, Qingyuan, Qu, Rui'an, Taishun, Yingzha, Yunhe, Yunshan, and Zhujiang. Fujian: Chong'an, Duyuan, Fu'an, Fuding, Guangze, Jianyang, Jian'ou, Pingnan, Pucheng, Shaowu, Shouning, and Zhenghe.) Occasional expeditions were carried out further afield, with mixed results. For example, units of the Red Army made three appearances in Jingdezhen, a city near the Soviet but normally under control of Nationalist troops. They captured rifles and gained new recruits, but caused merchants to flee and considerably disrupted pottery production in the town.

The location of the Soviet between the "Central Soviet" in southern Jiangxi and the Central Committee in Shanghai made it a key communications link until the Central Committee moved to Rujin.

== Bibliography ==
- Sheel, Kamal (1989). Peasant Society and Marxist Intellectuals in China: Fang Zhimin and the Origin of a Revolutionary Movement in the Xinjiang Region. Princeton, NJ: Princeton University Press.
- Wilbur, C. Martin (1983). The nationalist revolution in China, 1923–1928. Cambridge University Press. ISBN 978-0-521-31864-8.
- Benton, George (1992). Mountain Fires: The Red Army's Three-Year War in South China, 1934-1938. Berkeley: University of California Press.
- Dillon, Michael (July 1992). "Fang Zhimin, Jingdezhen and the Northeast Jiangxi Soviet: Tradition, Revolution and Civil War in a Pottery Town". Modern Asian Studies. 26 (3): 569–589. doi:10.1017/S0026749X00009914.
- Averill, Stephen (May 1987). "Party, Society, and Local Elite in the Jiangxi Communist Movement". The Journal of Asian Studies. 46 (2): 279–303. doi:10.2307/2056015. JSTOR 2056015.
- Kim, Ilpyong J. (1974). The Politics of Chinese Communism: Kiangsi under the Soviets. Berkeley, California: University of California Press.
