= Governor of the People's Bank of China =

Head of the People's Bank of China

- 中国人民银行行长
- National Emblem of China

- Flag of China

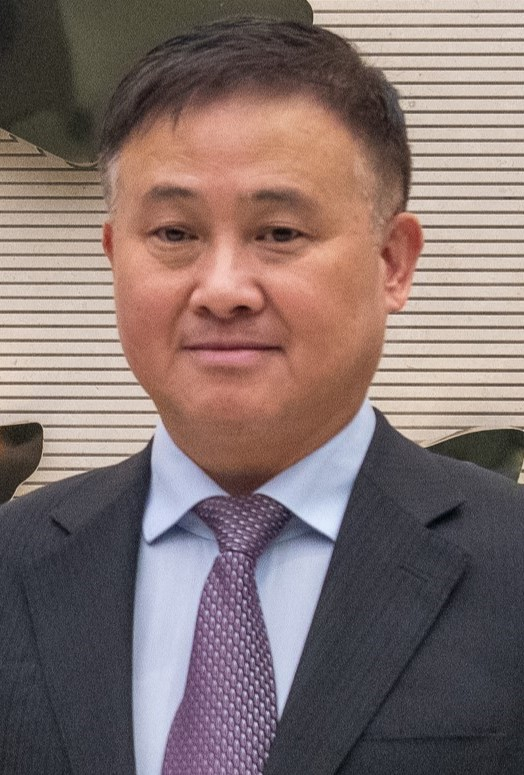
- Incumbent; Pan Gongsheng since 25 July 2023
- People's Bank of China
- Status: Provincial and ministerial-level official
- Member of: Plenary Meeting of the State Council
- Seat: Beijing
- Nominator: Premier (chosen within the Chinese Communist Party)
- Appointer: President; with the confirmation of the National People's Congress or its Standing Committee
- Inaugural holder: Nan Hanchen
- Formation: 1 October 1949; 76 years ago
- Deputy: Deputy Governor of the People's Bank of China

Governor of the People's Bank of China
- Simplified Chinese: 中国人民银行行长
Transcriptions
Standard Mandarin
- Hanyu Pinyin: Zhōngguó Rénmíng Yínháng Xíngzhǎng

The governor of the People's Bank of China is the head of the People's Bank of China and one of the country's key economic decisionmakers. Officially, the governor is nominated by the premier of the State Council, who is then approved by the National People's Congress or its Standing Committee and appointed by the president.

The governor post is not necessarily held concurrently with the Chinese Communist Party (CCP) secretary of the PBC. The CCP committee secretary is the most powerful position in the bank and can hold more sway than the governor. The current PBC governor Pan Gongsheng holds both posts. The governor also chairs the PBC Monetary Policy Committee, an advisory body that typically includes the directors and deputy directors of other financial agencies, as well as a few influential academic economists.

The current governor is Pan Gongsheng, who concurrently serves as the Chinese Communist Party (CCP) committee secretary of the PBC.

== List of officeholders ==
No.	Name	Took office	Left office	Premier	Party Secretary	Ref.
1	Nan Hanchen	October 1949	October 1954	Zhou Enlai	Nan Hanchen	
2	Cao Juru	October 1954	October 1964	Zhou Enlai	Cao Juru	
3	Hu Lijiao	October 1964	1966	Zhou Enlai	Hu Lijiao	
Position abolished during Cultural Revolution						
4	Chen Xiyu	13 May 1973	March 1978	Zhou Enlai		
4	Chen Xiyu	13 May 1973	March 1978	Hua Guofeng		
5	Li Baohua	5 March 1978	4 May 1982	Hua Guofeng	Li Baohua	
5	Li Baohua	5 March 1978	4 May 1982	Zhao Ziyang	Li Baohua	
6	Lü Peijian	4 May 1982	21 March 1985	Zhao Ziyang	Lü Peijian	
7	Chen Muhua	21 March 1985	12 April 1988	Zhao Ziyang	Chen Muhua	
8	Li Guixian	12 April 1988	2 July 1993	Li Peng	Chen Muhua	
8	Li Guixian	12 April 1988	2 July 1993	Li Peng	Li Guixian	
9	Zhu Rongji	2 July 1993	30 June 1995	Li Peng	Zhou Zhengqing	
10	Dai Xianglong	30 June 1995	28 December 2002	Li Peng	Dai Xianglong	
10	Dai Xianglong	30 June 1995	28 December 2002	Zhu Rongji	Dai Xianglong	
11	Zhou Xiaochuan	28 December 2002	19 March 2018	Zhu Rongji	Zhou Xiaochuan	
11	Zhou Xiaochuan	28 December 2002	19 March 2018	Wen Jiabao	Zhou Xiaochuan	
11	Zhou Xiaochuan	28 December 2002	19 March 2018	Li Keqiang	Zhou Xiaochuan	
12	Yi Gang	19 March 2018	25 July 2023	Li Keqiang	Guo Shuqing	
12	Yi Gang	19 March 2018	25 July 2023	Li Qiang	Guo Shuqing	
13	Pan Gongsheng	25 July 2023	Incumbent	Li Qiang	Pan Gongsheng	
