= Fang Zhichun =

Chinese politician

Fang Zhicun

Governor of Jiangxi
- In office September 1965 – January 1968
- Preceded by: Shao Shiping
- Succeeded by: Cheng Shiqing

Personal details
- Born: September 11, 1905 Yiyang County, Jiangxi, China
- Died: July 31, 1993 (aged 87)
- Party: Chinese Communist Party

Fang Zhichun (Chinese: 方志純) (September 11, 1905 – July 31, 1993) was a Chinese politician. He was a cousin of Fang Zhimin. He was born in Yiyang County, Jiangxi Province. He joined the Chinese Communist Party in 1924 and participated in the Nanchang Uprising of August 1927. In January 1928, along with his cousin and Huang Dao, he organized an uprising in Hengfeng County, Jiangxi Province. In 1937 he went to Yan'an and in 1938 he went to the USSR. After returning to China, he was arrested and imprisoned in Xinjiang by local warlord Sheng Shicai. In June 1946, he married Zhu Danhua, the widow of Mao Zedong's younger brother Mao Zemin, and became the stepfather Mao Zedong's nephew Mao Yuanxin.

Preceded by Shao Shiping	Governor of Jiangxi	Succeeded by Cheng Shiqing
