= Encirclement campaign against the Northeastern Jiangxi Soviet =

1930 military campaign

Encirclement campaign against Northeastern Jiangxi Soviet
- Part of Chinese Civil War
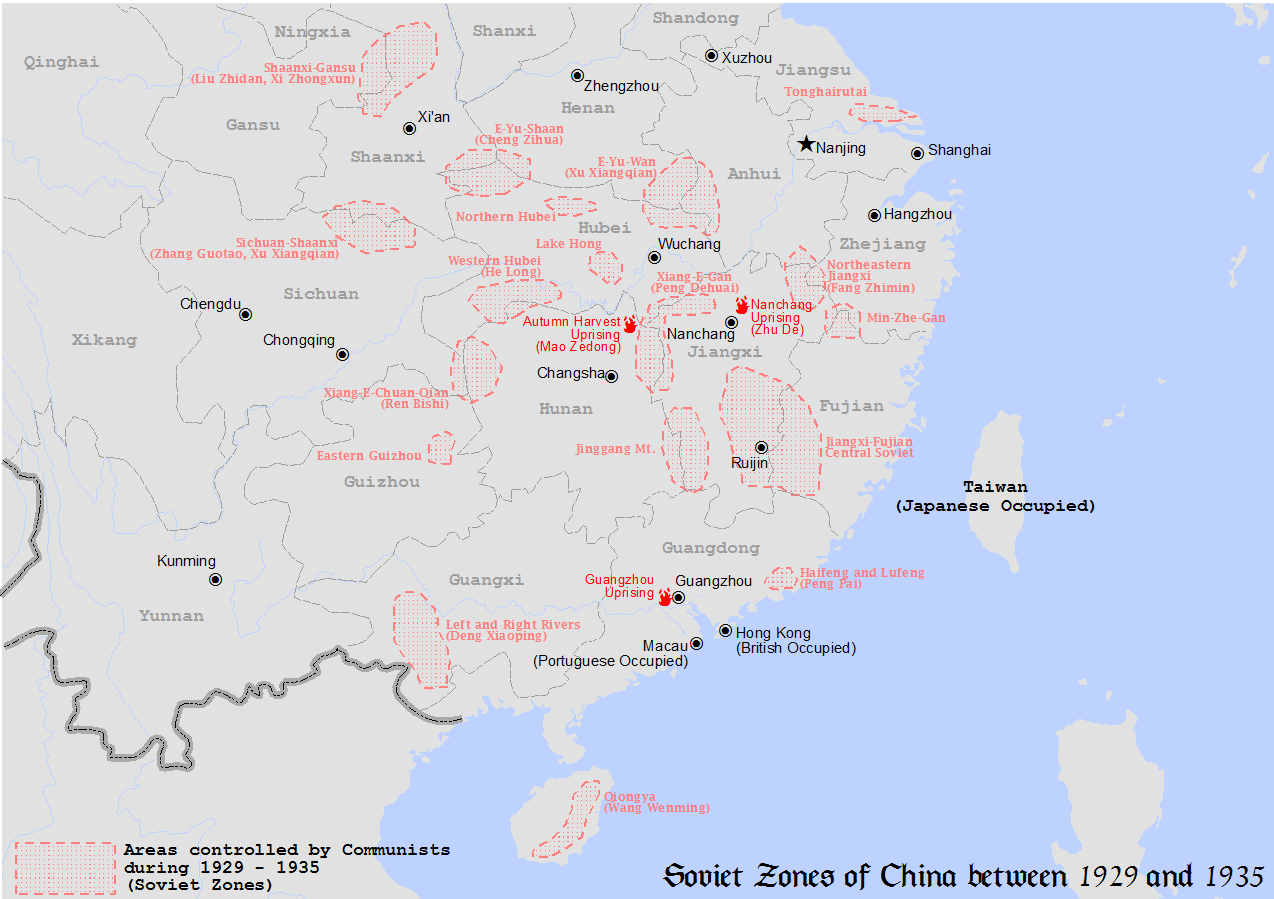
- Location of Northeastern Jiangxi Soviet
Date	December, 1930 – July, 1931
Location	Northeastern Jiangxi, China
Result	Nationalist victory

Belligerents
Nationalist China	Chinese Red Army

Commanders and leaders
Chiang Kai-shek	Fang Zhimin

Strength
100,000+	Several thousands

Casualties and losses
> 10,000	Heavy

The encirclement campaign against the Northeastern Jiangxi Soviet was a campaign launched by the Chinese Nationalist Government intended to destroy the communist Chinese Soviet Republic and its local military forces. It was met by the Communists' Counter-encirclement campaign at Northeastern Jiangxi Soviet (Chinese: 赣东北苏区反围剿), also called the Counter-encirclement campaign at Northeastern Jiangxi Revolutionary Base (Chinese: 赣东北革命根据地反围剿). The Nationalist campaign lasted from December 1930 to July 1931, and resulted in the destruction of the target base area.

== The base area ==
The Jiangxi Soviet was a communist base in the northeastern part of Jiangxi guarded by the 10th Army of the Chinese Red Army, and it was the right flank of the Jiangxi Soviet. In comparison to the major communist base in southern Jiangxi, the Jiangxi Soviet, this communist base was much closer to the nationalist strongholds and it was at the forefront of the nationalist controlled regions, and consequently, it had become a main target the nationalists marked for destruction. The encirclement campaign against Jiangxi Soviet begun in December, 1930, shortly after the First encirclement campaign against Jiangxi Soviet. However, due to the allocation of available troops and other resources to the top priority target, the Jiangxi Soviet, the encirclement campaign against the Jiangxi Soviet was protracted, and was not over until July 1931 after the Third encirclement campaign against Jiangxi Soviet had already started.

== Commencement ==
The initial stage of the campaign resulted in communist victory, with the Nationalists suffering three consecutive defeats immediately after the start of their encirclement campaign in the regions of Shangrao prefectural centre, Zhushanqiao (珠山桥, Pearl Mountain Bridge), and Hekou (河口, River mouth), losing more than 1,500 troops in the process. A stalemate was reached as result, and the nationalists stopped their offensives. However, the huge number of the nationalist troops surrounding the Jiangxi Soviet still posed a major threat, and the nationalists could have struck at any time. To distract the enemy, the communist 10th Army of the Chinese Red Army launched diversion offensives in late March 1931 in the regions of Guixi (贵溪), and Yujiang (余江), and then continued their offensives in northern Fujian, annihilating several thousands nationalist troops in the process. After their eleven consecutive victories in northern Fujian, the communist main force returned in May 1931 and expanded the communist base further. Despite their victories, the communists had failed to distract the nationalists from redeploying any of their troops away from the Jiangxi Soviet.

== Completion ==
The final blow finally arrived when the much anticipated nationalist all-front offensive begun in July 1931, which was unexpectedly helped by a highly unlikely source: the communists themselves. As Wang Ming prevailed in the power struggles against Mao Zedong, Mao's proven effective strategies and tactics were abolished as well when Mao's power and influence dropped, and the Jiangxi Soviet was one of the first places that reflected the rise of Wang Ming and the decline of Mao Zedong, despite the fact that Mao was still very much in power elsewhere, such as in the Jiangxi Soviet. However, as the military doctrines of Wang Ming and his supporters were adopted and put in use, they were proven to be completely unsuited for defending the communist base. As a result, the communist force was annihilated and the communist base of Jiangxi Soviet was reduced to a tiny fraction of its original size centered at Geyuan.

Although the communist base was not fully destroyed until March 1943 when the last of its communist guerrillas were finally eliminated and the communist commander Yang Wenhan (杨文翰) captured, (who was subsequently executed by the nationalists seven months later in October in the region of Goose' Beak (E'zui 鹅嘴) at the northern gate of the city of Yiyang (弋阳)), it was no longer a threat to the nationalists like once it was. The nationalists did not even bother to continue any follow-up campaigns after the annihilation of their communist enemy in July 1931, except a single eradication campaign at the end of 1938 in which over 17,000 nationalist troops were deployed. The surviving communist base and communist force were insignificant enough for the nationalists to declare a victory and redeploy their forces against communists elsewhere. As for the communists, the destruction of its Jiangxi Soviet meant that the important right flank of Jiangxi Soviet was lost, and more nationalist forces were available to insert greater pressures on communist forces and bases elsewhere.

== See also ==
- Outline of the Chinese Civil War
- National Revolutionary Army
- History of the People's Liberation Army
- Chinese Civil War
