= Shao Shiping =

Chinese politician

Shao Shiping (Chinese: 邵式平) (1900–1965) was a Chinese politician. He was born in Yiyang County, Jiangxi Province in the People's Republic of China.

He joined the Communist Youth League of China and the Chinese Communist Party in 1925. In January 1928, along with Fang Zhimin and Huang Dao, he organized an uprising in Hengfeng County, Jiangxi Province. During the Second Sino-Japanese War, he was active in the border region of Shanxi, Chahar Province and Hebei.

He went to Northeast China after the end of the Second Sino-Japanese War, where he organized Chinese Communist Party groups in Liaoning and Jilin Provinces. With the creation of the People's Republic in 1949, he returned to his home province as its 1st governor.

Preceded by New office	Governor of Jiangxi	Succeeded by Fang Zhichun
