= Huang Zhizhen =

Chinese politician

- 黄知真

Chairman of Hubei Provincial People's Congress
- In office May 1986 – April 1993
- Preceded by: Han Ningfu
- Succeeded by: Guan Guangfu

Governor of Hubei
- In office April 1983 – January 1986
- Preceded by: Han Ningfu
- Succeeded by: Guo Zhenqian

Personal details
- Born: October 1920 Hengfeng County, Jiangxi, China
- Died: 5 February 1993 (aged 72) Wuhan, Hubei, China
- Party: Chinese Communist Party
- Parent: Huang Dao

Chinese name
- Simplified Chinese: 黄知真
- Traditional Chinese: 黃知真
Transcriptions
Standard Mandarin
- Hanyu Pinyin: Huang Zhizhen

Huang Zhizhen (Chinese: 黄知真; October 1920 – February 5, 1993) also known as Zhu Feng (Chinese: 朱风), was a Chinese politician.

He was born in Hengfeng County, Jiangxi Province. He was the son of New Fourth Army general Huang Dao. He was governor of Hubei Province.

Government offices
Preceded by Han Ningfu	Governor of Hubei; 1983–1986	Succeeded by Guo Zhenqian
Assembly seats
Preceded by Han Ningfu	Chairman of Hubei Provincial People's Congress; 1986–1993	Succeeded by Guan Guangfu
