= Li Baohua =

Chinest politician (1909–2005)

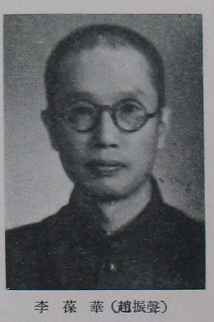

Governor of the People's Bank of China
- In office 5 January 1978 – 4 May 1982
- Premier: Hua Guofeng; Zhao Ziyang
- Preceded by: Chen Xiyu
- Succeeded by: Lü Peijian

Party Secretary of the People's Bank of China
- In office January 1978 – April 1982
- Preceded by: Hu Lijiao
- Succeeded by: Lü Peijian

Party Secretary of Anhui
- In office February 1962 – May 1971
- Preceded by: Zeng Xisheng
- Succeeded by: Li Desheng

Deputy Secretary of the Central Commission for Discipline Inspection
- In office November 1949 – 31 March 1955

Personal details
- Born: October 2, 1909 Laoting County, Hebei, China
- Died: February 19, 2005 (aged 95)
- Party: Chinese Communist Party

Li Baohua (simplified Chinese: 李葆华; traditional Chinese: 李葆華; October 2, 1909 – February 19, 2005) was a Chinese politician.

== Biography ==
Li was born in Laoting County, Hebei Province. He was the oldest child of Li Dazhao (1889-1927) who was the co-founder of the Chinese Communist Party (CCP). After the death of Li Dazhao, the CCP managed to send Li Baohua to Japan to receive his college education. Upon his return to China, Li Baohua participated in the Chinese Communist Revolution. After the establishment of the People's Republic of China, he first served as a vice minister in the Department of Water Resources and Electric Power. He was the secretary of the CCP Provincial Committee in Anhui from 1962 to 1971. He was the governor of the People's Bank of China from 1978 to 1982. He was the chairman of the CPPCC of Guizhou Province from 1977 to 1979.

Government offices
Preceded by Chen Xiyu	Governor of the People's Bank of China; 1978–1982	Succeeded by Lü Peijian
Party political offices
Preceded by Zeng Xisheng	Party Secretary of Anhui; 1962–1971	Succeeded by Li Desheng
Political offices
Preceded by Zeng Xisheng	CPPCC Chairman of Anhui; 1962–1967	Succeeded by Gu Zhuoxin
Preceded by Miao Chunting	CPPCC Chairman of Guizhou; 1977–1979	Succeeded by Chi Biqing
