= Party Secretary of Shandong =

Provincial government position in China

Secretary of the Shandong Provincial Committee of the Chinese Communist Party
- 中国共产党山东省委员会书记
- Emblem of the Chinese Communist Party

- Flag of the Chinese Communist Party
- Incumbent; Lin Wu since 29 December 2022
- Shandong Provincial Committee of the Chinese Communist Party
- Type: Party Committee Secretary
- Status: Provincial and ministerial-level official
- Member of: Shandong Provincial Standing Committee
- Nominator: Central Committee
- Appointer: Shandong Provincial Committee; Central Committee
- Inaugural holder: Kang Sheng
- Formation: March 1949
- Deputy: Deputy Secretary; Secretary-General

The secretary of the Shandong Provincial Committee of the Chinese Communist Party is the leader of the Shandong Provincial Committee of the Chinese Communist Party (CCP). As the CCP is the sole ruling party of the People's Republic of China (PRC), the secretary is the highest ranking post in Shandong.

The secretary is officially appointed by the CCP Central Committee based on the recommendation of the CCP Organization Department, which is then approved by the Politburo and its Standing Committee. The secretary can be also appointed by a plenary meeting of the Shandong Provincial Committee, but the candidate must be the same as the one approved by the central government. The secretary leads the Standing Committee of the Shandong Provincial Committee, and is usually a member of the CCP Central Committee. The secretary leads the work of the Provincial Committee and its Standing Committee. The secretary is outranks the governor, who is generally the deputy secretary of the committee.

The current secretary is Lin Wu, who took office on 29 December 2022.

== List of party secretaries ==
No.	Image	Name	Term start	Term end	Ref.
1		Kang Sheng (1898–1975)	March 1949	December 1949	
–		Fu Qiutao (1907–1981)	December 1949	August 1950	
–		Xiang Ming (1909–1969)	August 1950	August 1954	
2		Shu Tong (1905–1998)	August 1954	October 1960	
3		Zeng Xisheng (1904–1968)	October 1960	March 1961	
4		Tan Qilong (1913–2003)	March 1961	February 1967	
5		Wang Xiaoyu (1914–1995)	February 1967	March 1971	
3		Yang Dezhi (1911–1994)	March 1971	November 1974	
4		Bai Rubing (1912–1994)	November 1974	December 1982	
5		Su Yiran (1918–2021)	December 1982	June 1985	
6		Liang Buting (1921–2021)	June 1985	December 1988	
7		Jiang Chunyun (1930–2021)	December 1988	October 1994	
8		Zhao Zhihao (born 1931)	October 1994	April 1997	
9		Wu Guanzheng (born 1938)	April 1997	November 2002	
10		Zhang Gaoli (born 1946)	23 November 2002	26 March 2007	
11		Li Jianguo (born 1946)	26 March 2007	31 March 2008	
12		Jiang Yikang (born 1953)	31 March 2008	1 April 2017	
13		Liu Jiayi (born 1956)	1 April 2017	30 September 2021	
14		Li Ganjie (born 1964)	30 September 2021	29 December 2022	
15		Lin Wu (born 1962)	29 December 2022	Incumbent	
