= Yu Mingtao =

Chinese politician

Yu Mingtao (Chinese: 于明涛; November 29, 1917 – May 28, 2017) was a politician of the People's Republic of China. He was the first Auditor General of National Audit Office of the People's Republic of China. He also served as governor of Shaanxi Province, and president of China Audit Society.

Born in Shen County, Hebei Province, he joined Chinese Communist Party in October 1936. After Lushan Conference in 1959, together with Hua Guofeng, he was elected as secretary in the secretariat of CCP Hunan committee. He was promoted to a standing committee member of CCP Hunan committee and director about economics commission of Hunan, in charge of industry, transportation and trade.

Since 1961, Yu had served as a standing committee member of CCP center-south bureau and director of its finance and trading commission, secretary of CCP Guangzhou municipal committee, vice director of Guangzhou municipal revolutionary commission, and governor of Shaanxi.

In 1983, Yu was appointed as first Auditor General of newly founded National Audit Office.

He was a member of 11th and 12th Central Committee of Chinese Communist Party. He also was a member of 13th Central Advisory Commission.

Political offices
Preceded by Wang Renzhong	Governor of Shaanxi; 1979–1983	Succeeded by Li Qingwei
Preceded by New Office	Auditor-General of the National Audit Office; 1983–1985	Succeeded by Lü Peijian
