= Cao Pengsheng =

Chinese army general

- 曹芃生

Political Commissar of the Lanzhou Military Region
- In office April 1990 – January 1996
- Commander: Fu Quanyou; Wang Ke; Liu Jingsong
- Preceded by: Li Xuanhua
- Succeeded by: Wen Zongren

Personal details
- Born: July 1930 (age 96) Laoting County, Hebei, China
- Party: Chinese Communist Party
- Education: Lu Xun Art School of Jidong Military District; PLA Second Political School

Military service
- Allegiance: People's Republic of China
- Branch/service: People's Liberation Army Ground Force
- Years of service: 1946–1996
- Rank: General
- Battles/wars: Chinese Civil War

Cao Pengsheng (Chinese: 曹芃生; pinyin: Cáo Péngshēng; born July 1930) is a general in the People's Liberation Army of China who served as political commissar of the Lanzhou Military Region from 1990 to 1996.

He was a member of the Standing Committee of the 9th Chinese People's Political Consultative Conference. He was a representative of the 13th National Congress of the Chinese Communist Party. He was a member of the 14th Central Committee of the Chinese Communist Party.

== Biography ==
Cao was born in Laoting County, Hebei, in July 1930.

He enlisted in the People's Liberation Army (PLA) in 1948, and joined the Chinese Communist Party (CCP) in the following year. During the Chinese Civil War, he served in the war and engaged in the Liaoshen campaign and Pingjin campaign.

In 1956, he enrolled at the PLA Second Political School, where he graduated in 1959. He was political commissar of the Shandong Military District in August 1985, and held that office until July 1988. He was also a member of the Standing Committee of the CCP Shandong Provincial Committee, the province's top authority.

In February 1988, he was appointed deputy political commissar of the Jinan Military Region, he remained in that position until April 1990, when he was transferred to the Lanzhou Military Region and was promoted to become political commissar.

He was promoted to the rank of major general (shaojiang) in September 1988, lieutenant general (zhongjiang) in July 1990, and general (shangjiang) in May 1994.

Military offices
Preceded by Su Yiran	Political Commissar of the Shandong Military District; 1985–1988	Succeeded by Li Chunting
Preceded by Li Xuanhua	Political Commissar of the Lanzhou Military Region; 1990–1996	Succeeded by Wen Zongren
