= Mount Gexian =

Mountain in China

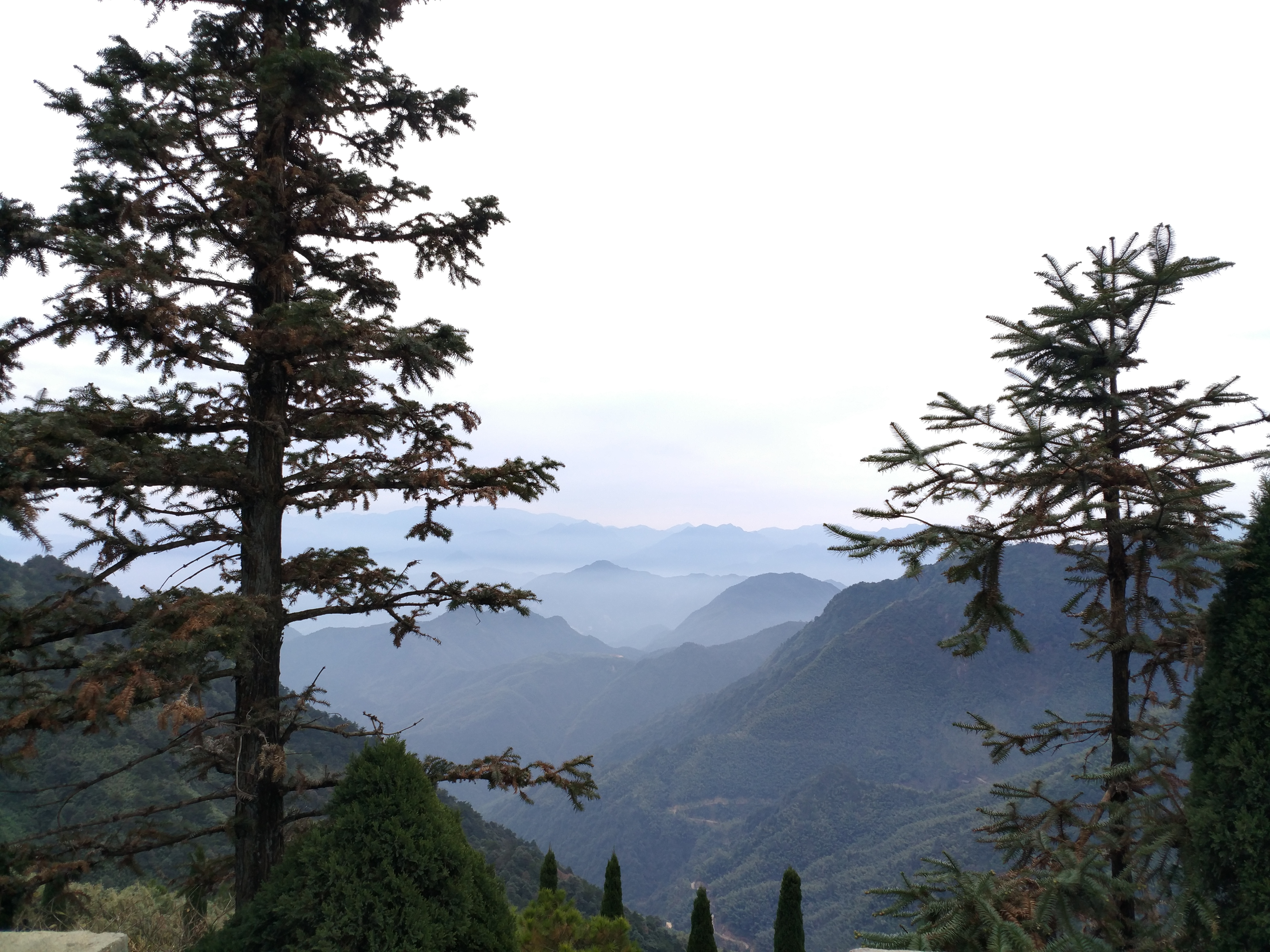

Highest point
- Elevation: 1,096.3-metre (3,597 ft)
- Coordinates: 28°04′15.97″N 117°42′03.13″E

Naming
- Native name: 葛仙山 (Chinese)

Geography
- Location: Yanshan County, Jiangxi
- Country: China
- Parent range: Wuyi Mountains

Mount Gexian (Chinese: 葛仙山; pinyin: Gěxiān Shān) is a 1,096.3 metres (3,597 ft) mountain in Yanshan County, Jiangxi, China. It has four best scenic spots: extraordinary pine trees, grotesque rocks, sea of clouds, and whistling of the wind in the pines. The highest point is Gexian Peak (Chinese: 葛仙峰) which stands 1,096.3 metres (3,597 ft) above sea level. In January 2018, it has been designated as an AAAA level tourist site by the China National Tourism Administration.

== Name ==
Legend has it that Han dynasty Taoist priest Ge Xuan became an immortal here.

== Temples ==
Mount Gexian, one of the most ancient mount in China, has a long history and deep cultural roots. It is full of historical sites and cultural relics associated with numerous legends.

The Gexian Ancestral Temple (葛仙祠), also known as Yuxu Temple (玉虚观), it the largest Taoist temple on the mountain. The original temple named "Zonghua Temple" (宗华观) dates back to the 9th century during the Tang dynasty (618–907). In 1065, Emperor Yingzong of Song inscribed and honored the name "Yuxu Temple". In 1092, it was renamed "Gexian Hall" (葛仙殿). It has been burned down and rebuilt a member of times, due to wars. The latest repair was in 1928. The grand temple complex is located in the northeast and faces the southwest with brief layout, it includes the Grand Hall of Gexian, Hall of Lord Lao Zi, Hall of Guanyin, Hall of Lingguan (灵官殿; 'Hall of Spiritual Officer'), Hall of the Earth Mother, and the Hall of Jade Emperor and east and west annex halls.

The Queen Mother Hall (娘娘殿) was built to commemorate Ge Xuan's mother.

The Ciji Temple (慈济寺) is a Buddhist temple on the mountain. It was originally built in 1593 during the reign of Wanli Emperor in the Ming dynasty (1368–1644).
