= Auditor-General of the National Audit Office =

Chinese government position

Auditor-General of the National Audit Office of the People's Republic of China
- 中华人民共和国审计署审计长
- National Emblem of China

- Flag of China
- Incumbent; Hou Kai since 30 June 2020
- National Audit Office
- Status: Provincial and ministerial-level official
- Member of: Plenary Meeting of the State Council
- Seat: National Audit Office Building, Fengtai District, Beijing
- Nominator: Premier (chosen within the Chinese Communist Party)
- Appointer: President with the confirmation of the National People's Congress or its Standing Committee
- Formation: June 1983; 43 years ago
- First holder: Yu Mingtao
- Deputy: Deputy Auditor-General

The auditor-general of the National Audit Office of the People's Republic of China is the head of the National Audit Office of the People's Republic of China and a member of the State Council. Within the State Council, the position is twenty-third in order of precedence. The minister is responsible for leading the ministry, presiding over its meetings, and signing important documents related to the ministry. Officially, the minister is nominated by the premier of the State Council, who is then approved by the National People's Congress or its Standing Committee and appointed by the president.

The current minister is Hou Kai, who concurrently serves as the Chinese Communist Party Committee Secretary of the office.

== List of auditors-general ==
No.	Name (Birth–Death)	Term of office		Premier	Ref.
No.	Name (Birth–Death)	Took office	Left office	Premier	Ref.
1	Yu Mingtao 于明涛 (1917–2017)	June 1983	March 1985	Zhao Ziyang	
2	Lü Peijian 吕培俭 (born 1928)	March 1985	April 1994	Zhao Ziyang ↓ Li Peng	
3	Guo Zhenqian 郭振乾 (1933–2019)	May 1994	March 1998	Li Peng	
4	Li Jinhua 李金华 (born 1943)	March 1998	March 2008	Zhu Rongji ↓ Wen Jiabao	
5	Liu Jiayi 刘家义 (born 1956)	March 2008	27 April 2017	Wen Jiabao ↓ Li Keqiang	
6	Hu Zejun 胡泽君 (born 1955)	27 April 2017	30 June 2020	Li Keqiang	
7	Hou Kai 侯凯 (born 1962)	30 June 2020	Incumbent	Li Keqiang ↓ Li Qiang	
