= Lü Peijian =

Chinese banker and politician

- 吕培俭

Auditor-General of the National Audit Office
- In office March 1985 – May 1994
- Preceded by: Yu Mingtao
- Succeeded by: Guo Zhenqian

6th Governor of the People's Bank of China
- In office 4 May 1982 – 21 March 1985
- Preceded by: Li Baohua
- Succeeded by: Chen Muhua

Personal details
- Born: August 1928 (age 98) Hongze, Jiangsu, China
- Party: Chinese Communist Party
- Education: Renmin University of China

Lü Peijian (simplified Chinese: 吕培俭; traditional Chinese: 呂培儉; born August 1928) is a Chinese retired politician and central banker. He served as Vice Minister of Finance from 1978 to 1982, Governor of the People's Bank of China from 1982 to 1985, and Auditor General of the National Audit Office from 1985 to 1994.

== Biography ==
Lü Peijian was born in August 1928 in Hongze, Jiangsu, Republic of China. During the Second Sino-Japanese War, he enlisted in the New Fourth Army in 1944 and joined the Chinese Communist Party in November of that year. He studied accounting and worked in the logistics department of the New Fourth Army, and later the East China Field Army of the People's Liberation Army during the Chinese Civil War.

After the founding of the People's Republic of China in 1949, Lü worked in the finance department of the East China region. He was transferred to the Ministry of Finance in Beijing in 1953, and took correspondence courses in industrial economics at Renmin University of China from 1954 to 1956.

Lü rose through the ranks in the Ministry of Finance, and was appointed Vice Minister in 1978. In 1982, he was appointed the sixth Governor of the People's Bank of China, China's central bank. In March 1985 he became the second Auditor General of the National Audit Office (NAO), which had just been established two years earlier to systematically audit the accounts of businesses, government units, and individuals. In August 1985, Lü told the China Daily that the NAO had audited the accounts of more than 24,000 businesses and units, and uncovered tax evasion, fraud, and waste worth more than US$1.6 billion. He served as Auditor General until 1994. From May 1994 to June 2000, he served as Chairman of the Board of Supervisors of China Development Bank.

Lü was a member of the 12th, 13th, and 14th Central Committee of the Chinese Communist Party. He served as a Standing Committee member of the 9th Chinese People's Political Consultative Conference.
