= Shandong Military District =

- 中国人民解放军山东省军区
- Founded: February 1949; 77 years ago
- Country: China
- Allegiance: Chinese Communist Party
- Type: Military district
- Role: Command and control
- Part of: People's Liberation Army
- Headquarters: Jinan, Shandong

Commanders
- Commander: Major general (shaojiang) Shi Huajie
- Political Commisar: Major general (shaojiang) Wang Aiguo

Chinese name
- Simplified Chinese: 中国人民解放军山东省军区
- Traditional Chinese: 中國人民解放軍山东省軍區
Transcriptions
Standard Mandarin
- Hanyu Pinyin: Zhōngguó Rénmín Jiěfàngjūn Shāndōngshěng Jūnqū

The Shandong Military District (Chinese: 中国人民解放军山东省军区; full name People's Liberation Army Shandong Military District or PLA Shandong Military District) is a military district of the National Defense Mobilization Department of the Central Military Commission in China.

== History ==
Shandong Military District was established in February 1949, under the jurisdiction of the East China Military Region of the People's Liberation Army.

== Leaders ==
=== Commanders ===
Name (English)	Name (Chinese)	Tenure begins	Tenure ends	Note
Zhang Yunyi	张云逸	February 1949	January 1950	
Xu Shiyou	许世友	January 1950	December 1954	
Wang Jinshan	王近山	December 1954	March 1955	
Chen Fangren	陈坊仁	October 1961	January 1965	
Tong Guogui	童国贵	January 1965	June 1975	
Li Xifu	黎锡福	June 1975	May 1976	
Zhao Feng	赵峰	May 1978	May 1983	
Liu Yude	刘玉德	May 1983	July 1988	
Yan Zhuo	阎琢	July 1988	July 1990	
Yi Yuanqiu	易元秋	July 1990	December 1993	
Shen Zhaoji	沈兆吉	December 1993	December 1995	
Zhang Qihong	张齐红	December 1995	March 2004	
Tan Wenhu	谈文虎	March 2004	October 2010	
Lang Jianzhao	郎剑钊	October 2010	December 2011	
Rong Senzhi	荣森之	December 2011	April 2017	
Zhao Jilu	赵冀鲁	April 2017	July 2019	
Qiu Yuechao	邱月潮	July 2019	September 2022	
Zhang Like	张立克	October 2022	May 2022	
Shi Huajie	石华杰	May 2024		

=== Political commissars ===
Name (English)	Name (Chinese)	Tenure begins	Tenure ends	Note
Kang Sheng	康生	February 1949	May 1952	
Shu Tong	舒同	May 1952	May 1955	
Zhou Xing	周兴	October 1961	May 1965	
Liu Binglin	刘秉琳	May 1965	May 1967	
Wang Xiaoyu	王效禹	May 1967	October 1970	
Xiong Fei	熊飞	December 1973	June 1975	
Chen De	陈德	June 1975	October 1980	
Liu Lian	刘琏	June 1981	May 1983	
Su Yiran	苏毅然	May 1983	June 1985	
Cao Pengsheng	曹芃生	August 1985	July 1988	
Li Chunting	李春廷	July 1988	November 1991	
Liu Guofu	刘国福	November 1991	October 1997	
He Faxiang	何法祥	October 1997	April 2001	
Zhao Chengfeng	赵承凤	April 2001	May 2004	
Zhang Bingde	张秉德	May 2004	February 2008	
Nan Bingjun	南兵军	February 2008	July 2011	
Liu Congliang	刘从良	July 2011	July 2014	
Lü Minsong	吕民松	July 2014	August 2016	
Shang Zhengui	尚振贵	August 2016	April 2020	
Zhu Yuwu	朱玉武	April 2020	December 2021	
Wang Aiguo	王爱国	December 2021		
