= Geyuan (disambiguation) =

Geyuan may refer to:

- Geyuan Garden, a Qing-era estate and garden in Yangzhou, Jiangsu, China
- Geyuan, Jiangxi (葛源鎮, Gěyuán Zhèn), a town in Hengfeng County, Jiangxi, China
- Geyuan Temple (閣院寺, Géyùan Sì), a Buddhist temple in Laiyuan County, Hebei, China
