= Jiang Yikang =

Chinese politician

- 姜异康

Party Secretary of Shandong
- In office 31 March 2008 – 1 April 2017
- Deputy: Jiang Daming; Guo Shuqing
- Preceded by: Li Jianguo
- Succeeded by: Liu Jiayi

Personal details
- Born: 9 January 1953 (age 73) Zhaoyuan, Shandong
- Party: Chinese Communist Party

Jiang Yikang (simplified Chinese: 姜异康; traditional Chinese: 姜異康; pinyin: Jiāng Yìkāng; born 9 January 1953) is a Chinese politician. He served for nearly ten years as the Party Secretary of Shandong between 2008 and 2017. A soldier in his youth, Jiang rose through the ranks through his work in the General Office of the Chinese Communist Party. He also served as the deputy party chief of Chongqing and the party secretary of the China National School of Administration.

== Biography ==
Jiang was born in Zhaoyuan, Shandong Province. He joined the military in 1969, serving in the far northwestern region of Xinjiang, and joined the Communist Party in December 1970. In 1974, he was sent back to his home province, and assigned a job as a worker in a mechanical factory. In 1975 he joined the Publicity Department of the city of Jinan, thereby beginning his political career. In 1981, he briefly attended Shandong Normal University in a cadres-training class.

In December 1982, Jiang joined the Jinan municipal party committee, working for its research office and as an office secretary. In 1985 he was selected to work for the General Office of the Chinese Communist Party, the party's central administrative organ, where Jiang would serve under four chiefs - Qiao Shi, Wang Zhaoguo, Wen Jiabao, and Zeng Qinghong. In July 1995 he was elevated to deputy director of the General Office (vice-minister rank), and the head of the department of administration for organizations directly subordinate to the Central Committee.

In October 2002, shortly before the 16th Party Congress, Jiang was transferred to Chongqing to serve as deputy party chief in the interior municipality. In May 2005, he was named the head of the commission for migrant re-settlement as part of the Three Gorges Dam project. In June 2006, he was again transferred to Beijing to serve as the executive vice president and Party Group Secretary of the National School of Administration (minister-level). In March 2008, he was named Party Secretary of Shandong.

In the lead-up to the 18th Party Congress, there was initial speculation that Jiang would be named head of the Organization Department and enter the Politburo; however he ultimately remained in Shandong. He left the post in April 2017 and became a vice-chair on the National People's Congress Financial and Economic Affairs Committee; at the time, Jiang was the longest serving provincial-level party chief in the country, and one of the few provincial party chiefs to be serving in their native province (see also Han Zheng).

He was an alternate of the 16th Central Committee of the Chinese Communist Party, and a full member of the 17th and 18th Central Committees. He was also a member of the 9th Chinese People's Political Consultative Conference and a deputy to the 10th National People's Congress.

Party political offices
Preceded by Li Jianguo	Party Secretary of Shandong; 2008–2017	Succeeded by Liu Jiayi
