= Liu Jiayi =

Chinese politician

- 刘家义
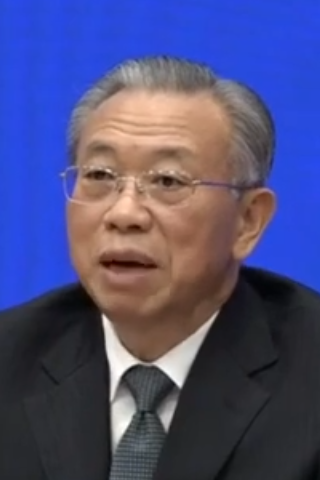
- Liu in 2019

Party Secretary of Shandong
- In office 1 April 2017 – 30 September 2021
- Governor: Gong Zheng (2017-2020); Li Ganjie (2020-2021)
- Preceded by: Jiang Yikang
- Succeeded by: Li Ganjie

Chairman of the Standing Committee of Shandong People's Congress
- In office April 2017 – 25 October 2021
- Preceded by: Jiang Yikang
- Succeeded by: Li Ganjie

Auditor-General of the National Audit Office
- In office 17 March 2008 – 27 April 2017
- Premier: Wen Jiabao→Li Keqiang
- Preceded by: Li Jinhua
- Succeeded by: Hu Zejun

Personal details
- Born: August 1956 (age 70) Kai County, Sichuan, China
- Party: Chinese Communist Party
- Education: Southwestern University of Finance and Economics

Chinese name
- Simplified Chinese: 刘家义
- Traditional Chinese: 劉家義
Transcriptions
Standard Mandarin
- Hanyu Pinyin: Liú Jiāyì

Liu Jiayi (Chinese: 刘家义; pinyin: Liú Jiāyì; born August 1956) is a Chinese politician. He is the former Chairman of the Standing Committee of Shandong People's Congress, Party Secretary of Shandong, and before that, Auditor-General of the National Audit Office.

== Biography ==
Born in Kai County, Sichuan (now part of Chongqing municipality), Liu graduated from Southwestern University of Finance and Economics. After college, he was assigned to work in the audit office of Sichuan Province. In 1988, he was promoted to a position in the Chengdu office of the National Audit Office. In the next few years, Liu specialized in commercial audits.

In September 1996, after completing one year of training for young cadres at the Central Party School of the Chinese Communist Party, Liu was appointed to the post of Deputy Auditor General. Following the retirement of Li Jinhua, he was promoted to the office of Auditor General of the People's Republic of China in March 2008. He was conferred the Grand Decoration of Honor in Gold with Sash, a state honor of Austria, on May 25, 2016.

He was transferred to Shandong province to become party chief there in 2017.

On 23 October 2021, he was appointed vice chairperson of the National People's Congress Financial and Economic Affairs Committee. On October 25, he resigned as chairman of the Standing Committee of Shandong People's Congress.

He is a senior auditor and a member of the 17th, 18th, and 19th Central Committees of the Chinese Communist Party.

Government offices
Preceded by Li Jinhua	Auditor-General of the National Audit Office; 2008–2017	Succeeded by Hu Zejun
Party political offices
Preceded by Jiang Yikang	Party Secretary of Shandong; 2017–2021	Succeeded by Li Ganjie
Assembly seats
Preceded by Jiang Yikang	Chairman of the Standing Committee of Shandong People's Congress; 2017–2021	Succeeded by Li Ganjie
