= Guan Guangfu =

Chinese politician (1931–2016)

- 关广富

Party Secretary of Hubei
- In office January 1983 – December 1994
- Preceded by: Chen Pixian
- Succeeded by: Jia Zhijie

Personal details
- Born: December 1931 Muling, Heilongjiang, China
- Died: 16 April 2016 (aged 84) Wuhan, Hubei, China
- Party: Chinese Communist Party
- Education: Hubei University

Guan Guangfu (Chinese: 关广富; December 1931 – 16 April 2016) was a Chinese politician of Manchu ethnicity. He served as Chinese Communist Party Committee Secretary of Hubei province from 1983 to 1994.

== Biography ==
Guan was born in December 1931 in Muling, Heilongjiang Province in northeast China. He was a Manchu. He joined the Chinese Communist Party (CCP) in July 1948.

From 1947 to 1949 Guan worked as an accountant in Muling. In 1949, he was transferred to Hubei Province in central China, working in the provincial finance department. In 1964 he acquired a degree in finance from Hubei University through correspondence learning. In 1973 he became Vice President of the Hubei Branch of the People's Bank of China, and was promoted to President in 1978.

In January 1983, Guan became CCP Committee Secretary of Hubei, and held that position until December 1994. During his tenure, he disagreed with Governor Guo Zhenqian and his successor Guo Shuyan, over the ambitious "Rising Abruptly" strategy, which aimed to dramatically increase the province's economic output. As a result, both governors ended their terms prematurely and left the provincial government.

From 1993 to 2002, Guan served as Chairman of the Hubei Provincial People's Congress. He was a member of the 12th, 13th, and 14th Central Committees of the CCP, serving from 1985 to 1997.

After retiring from politics Guan focused on painting, and was interviewed in his studio by Xinhua News Agency in 2010. He said he was especially fond of Shennongjia, and was proud of his policies protecting the nature reserve. He died in Wuhan on 16 April 2016.
