= Guo Shuyan =

Chinese politician and engineer (1935–2022)

- 郭树言

Governor of Hubei
- In office February 1990 – December 1992
- Party Chief: Guan Guangfu
- Preceded by: Guo Zhenqian
- Succeeded by: Jia Zhijie

Personal details
- Born: October 1935 Zhenping County, Henan, China
- Died: 23 January 2022 (aged 86–87)
- Party: Chinese Communist Party
- Education: Nankai University, Ural Polytechnic Institute

Guo Shuyan (Chinese: 郭树言; October 1935 – 23 January 2022) was a Chinese engineer and politician. He served as Governor of Hubei from 1990 to 1993. He also served as the deputy director of the State Science and Technology Commission from 1985 to 1990 and deputy director of the Three Gorges Project Construction Committee from 1993 to 2003.

== Early life and education ==
Guo Shuyan was born in October 1935 in Zhenping County, Henan, Republic of China. He attended Nankai University in 1952, before going to the Soviet Union to study at the Ural Polytechnic Institute, where he earned a degree in metallurgy in 1959. He joined the Chinese Communist Party in 1957.

== Career ==
In 1959, in the midst of the Great Leap Forward, Guo returned to China and worked at the Shenyang Manufacturing Research Institute of the First Ministry of Machine Building. He would work at the institute for nearly two decades, later rising to deputy director.

From 1978 to 1982, Guo served as deputy director and Chief Engineer of the Institute of High Energy Physics of the Chinese Academy of Sciences. He served as deputy director of the Bureau of Development Estimates of the State Science and Technology Commission from 1982 to 1983, and deputy director of the Science and Technology Leading Group of the State Council from 1983 to 1984.

From 1985 to 1990, Guo served as deputy director of the State Science and Technology Commission. In this capacity, he was instrumental in introducing the Chinese-developed anti-malarial drug artemisinin to Africa.

In 1990, Guo was appointed Governor and Deputy Party Secretary of Hubei Province. His predecessor, Guo Zhenqian (no relation), had disagreed with Guan Guangfu, the Party Secretary of Hubei, over the ambitious "Rising Abruptly" strategy, which aimed to dramatically increase the province's economic output. However, Guo Shuyan also proved incompatible with Guan, and similarly ended his term prematurely.

From 1993 to 2003, Guo Shuyan served as deputy director of the Three Gorges Project Construction Committee. He also concurrently served as deputy director of the State Planning Commission from 1993 to 1998. From 2003 to 2008, he served as Vice Chairman of the Financial and Economic Affairs Committee of the 10th National People's Congress.
