= Hu Zejun =

Chinese politician

Hu Zejun (Chinese: 胡泽君; born March 1955) is a Chinese politician and served as the Auditor-General of the National Audit Office from 2017 to 2020.

== Biography ==
Hu was born in Chongqing. She graduated from the Southwest University of Political Science & Law with a degree in philosophy, and joined the Chinese Communist Party in February 1976. She also has a master's degree in the history of Chinese legal thought. Upon graduating, she served in the Communist Youth League organization at her alma mater, while serving as a teaching assistant and later an instructor. She was eventually promoted to the party chief of her alma mater. She was then promoted to Deputy Minister of Justice. She was then dispatched to Guangdong to become a part of the provincial party standing committee and head of the provincial organization department. In June 2010, she was named the Deputy Procurator-General of the Supreme People's Procuratorate (minister-level).

In April 2017, Hu was named Auditor General of the People's Republic of China, succeeding Liu Jiayi, becoming the first female to hold the position.

Hu is an alternate of the 17th Central Committee of the Chinese Communist Party, and a full member of the 18th and 19th Central Committees.

In June 2020, Hu was replaced by Hou Kai and was appointed as one of the deputy directors of the Chinese People's Political Consultative Conference Population, Resources, and Environment Committee.

Government offices
Preceded by Liu Jiayi	Auditor-General of the National Audit Office; 2017–2020	Succeeded by Hou Kai
