= Hou Kai =

Chinese politician

- 侯凯

Auditor-General of the National Audit Office
- Incumbent
- Assumed office 30 June 2020
- Premier: Li Keqiang; Li Qiang
- Preceded by: Hu Zejun

Personal details
- Born: April 1962 (age 64) Shenyang, Liaoning, China
- Party: Chinese Communist Party
- Education: Central University of Finance and Economics; Central Party School of the Chinese Communist Party

Chinese name
- Simplified Chinese: 侯凯
- Traditional Chinese: 侯凱
Transcriptions
Standard Mandarin
- Hanyu Pinyin: Hóu Kǎi

Hou Kai (Chinese: 侯凯; born April 1962) is a Chinese politician, currently serving as auditor-general of the National Audit Office. He has been a member of the Standing Committee of the Central Commission for Discipline Inspection since November 2012.

He is a representative of the 20th National Congress of the Chinese Communist Party and a member of the 20th Central Committee of the Chinese Communist Party.

== Early life and education ==
Hou was born in Shenyang, Liaoning, in April 1962. In 1980, he was accepted to Central University of Finance and Economics, where he majored in finance.

== Political career ==
After university in 1984, Hou was despatched to the Financial Audit Department of the National Audit Office, where he was promoted to deputy director in November 1999 and to director in February 2003. Hou joined the Chinese Communist Party (CCP) in December 1987. He was director of the General Office of the National Audit Office in February 2009, in addition to serving as deputy auditor-general in September 2010.

He was appointed secretary of the Shanghai Municipal Commission for Discipline Inspection in November 2013 and was admitted to a member of the Standing Committee of the CCP Shanghai Municipal Committee, the province's top authority.

Hou was transferred back to the central government in December 2016, when he was appointed deputy secretary of the Working Committee of Organs Directly under the Central Government. He was a member of the National Supervisory Commission from March 2018 to June 2020.

In June 2020, Hou was chosen as auditor-general of the National Audit Office, succeeding Hu Zejun.

Government offices
Preceded by Zhang Ke	Director of the General Office of the National Audit Office; 2009–2011	Succeeded by Chen Chenzhao
Preceded by Hu Zejun	Auditor-General of the National Audit Office; 2020–	Incumbent
Party political offices
Preceded by Yang Xiaodu	Secretary of the Shanghai Municipal Commission for Discipline Inspection of the Chinese Communist Party; 2013–2016	Succeeded by Liao Guoxun
