= Yan Youmin =

Chinese politician (1918–2001)

Yan Youmin (Chinese: 严佑民) (1918–2001) was a People's Republic of China politician. He was born in Chengcheng County, Shaanxi Province. He was the 1st Chairman of the People's Standing Congress of Shanghai (1981).

| Preceded by New office | Chairman of the People's Standing Congress of Shanghai; 1981 | Succeeded by Hu Lijiao |
