= Guo Zhenqian =

Chinese politician and banker (1933–2019)

- 郭振乾

Auditor General of the National Audit Office
- In office April 1994 – March 1998
- Preceded by: Lü Peijian
- Succeeded by: Li Jinhua

Vice Governor of the People's Bank of China
- In office February 1990 – July 1993
- Governor: Li Guixian

Governor of Hubei
- In office December 1985 – February 1990 (acting until May 1986)
- Party Chief: Guan Guangfu
- Preceded by: Huang Zhizhen
- Succeeded by: Guo Shuyan

Personal details
- Born: February 1933 Luoning County, Henan, China
- Died: 13 August 2019 (aged 86) Beijing, China
- Resting place: Babaoshan Revolutionary Cemetery
- Party: Chinese Communist Party
- Education: Renmin University of China

Chinese name
- Chinese: 郭振乾
Transcriptions
Standard Mandarin
- Hanyu Pinyin: Guō Zhènqián
- Wade–Giles: Kuo Chen-ch'ien
- IPA: [kwó ʈʂə̂ntɕʰjɛ̌n]

Guo Zhenqian (Chinese: 郭振乾; February 1933 – 13 August 2019) was a Chinese politician and banker. He served as Governor of Hubei from 1985 to 1990, Vice Governor of the People's Bank of China from 1990 to 1993, and Auditor-General of the National Audit Office from 1994 to 1998.

== Early life and education ==
Guo was born in February 1933 in Luoning County, Henan, Republic of China. He participated in the Communist Revolution from July 1947 and joined the Chinese Communist Party in April 1949. In July 1951, he entered Renmin University of China to study commerce and graduated in August 1954.

== Career in Hubei ==
After university, Guo worked at the Department of Commerce of Hubei Province. Starting in December 1957, he worked at Wuhan School of Commerce, and later served as vice principal. He was persecuted during the early phase of the Cultural Revolution.

In October 1972, Guo began working at the Office of Finance and Commerce of Hubei. In October 1980, he was appointed President of the Hubei Branch of China Construction Bank. In April 1983, he was appointed Vice Governor of Hubei and Director of the Provincial Economics Committee. He was promoted to Deputy Party Secretary and Acting Governor of Hubei in December 1985 and Governor in May 1986.

During his tenure in Hubei, Guo focused on the economic growth of the province. To pressure provincial enterprises to cut their losses, he published a list of loss-making businesses in a newspaper, and coordinated banks and government financial departments to help them reduce their losses or turn a profit. However, he disagreed with Guan Guangfu, the Party Secretary of Hubei, over the ambitious "Rising Abruptly" strategy, which aimed to dramatically increase the province's economic output. As a result, Guo ended his term prematurely and left the province, as later did his successor, Guo Shuyan.

== Career in the national government ==
In February 1990, Guo was transferred to Beijing to serve as minister-level Vice Governor of the People's Bank of China, the country's central bank. In this capacity, he supported the opening of the Shanghai Stock Exchange and the Shenzhen Stock Exchange.

In July 1993, Guo was appointed Deputy Auditor-General of the National Audit Office (NAO), and was soon promoted to Auditor-General in April 1994. After the National Audit Law was adopted in 1995, the NAO initiated an audit of 43 ministries and departments of the central government, including the Ministry of Finance, the General Administration of Customs, and the State Taxation Administration. The audit uncovered systematic corruption in the government, but the results were not initially made public. A year after Guo stepped down from his position, Premier Zhu Rongji published the report in 1999, disclosing many serious problems including the misuse of hydrological funds by the Ministry of Water Resources.

In March 1998, Guo became a member of the Standing Committee of the 9th National People's Congress, Deputy Director of the Congress's Finance and Economics Committee, and Founding Director of the Budget Committee. He was a member of the 13th and 14th Central Committee of the Chinese Communist Party.

== Death ==
Guo died on 13 August 2019 in Beijing, at age 86. He was buried in the Babaoshan Revolutionary Cemetery.
