= Geyuan, Jiangxi =

Geyuan 葛源镇
- Town
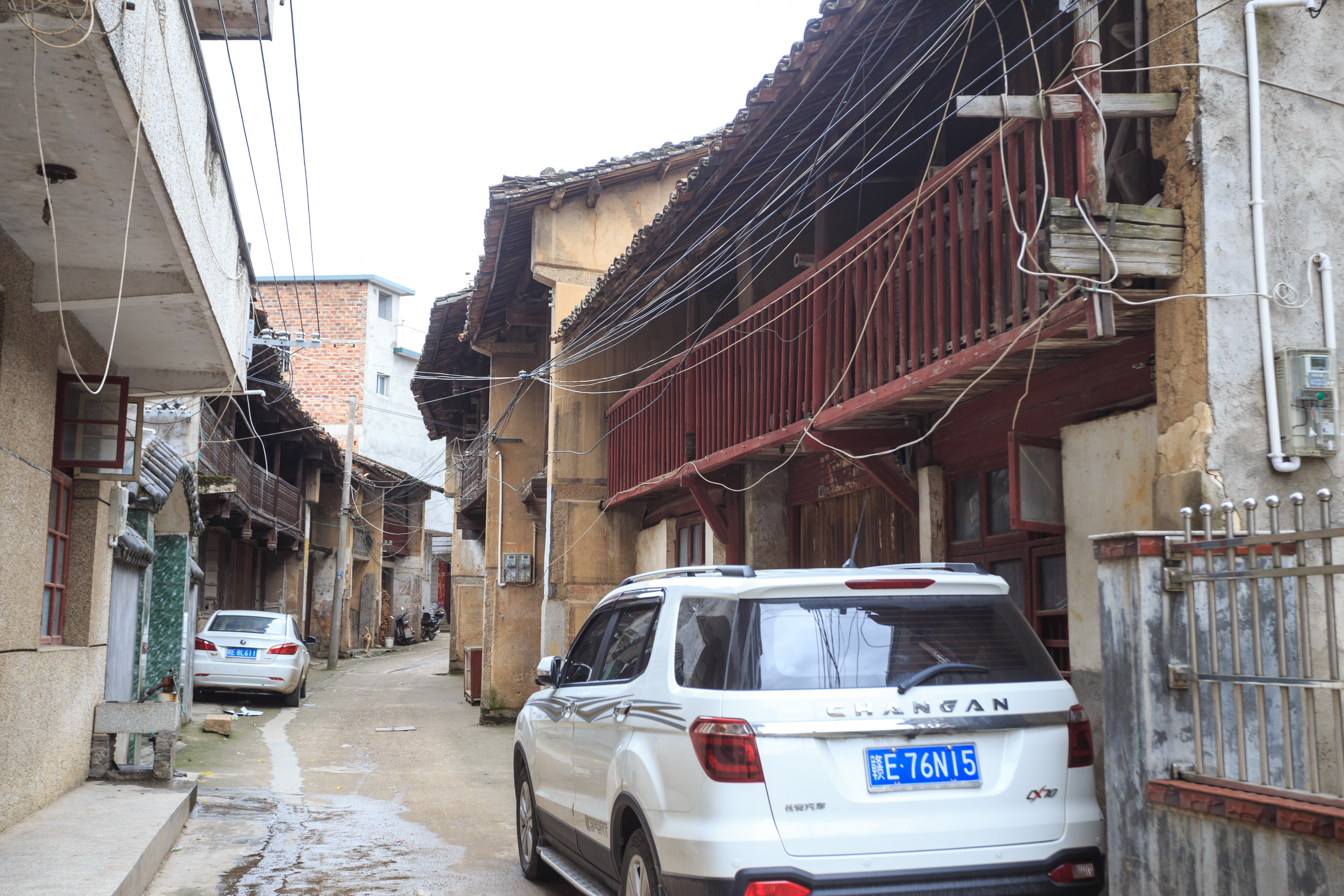
- A narrow street in Geyuan

- Location in China
- Coordinates: 28°36′18″N 117°39′30″E
- Country: People's Republic of China
- Province: Jiangxi
- Prefecture-level city: Shangrao
- County: Hengfeng County
- Time zone: UTC+8 (China Standard)

Geyuan (Chinese: 葛源) is a town in Hengfeng County, Shangrao city, Jiangxi, China. In 2018, it had one residential community and eight villages under its administration.

The speciality products are edible oil, tea, kudzu tea and kudzu powder.

== History ==
=== Imperial ===
The town's name means the headstream (yuan) of kudzu (ge).

As the Sui dynasty ended and Tang dynasty began, families with the surname of Su and Feng settled here at the source of a stream where kudzu flourished.

In year 3 of Tang Zhenguan (629 CE), a family surnamed Zheng moved here. Then came the families Cai, Ye, Luo and Jin.

=== Revolutionary ===
In December 1927, a rebellion against the Jiangxi governor was waged. In February 1931, the committee in charge of the Northeast Jiangxi Revolutionary Base Area under Fang Zhimin moved from Yiyang county to Hengfeng, setting up the Soviet government of the Special Administration Region of northeast Jiangxi in Geyuan town. In November 1931, at Ruijin the Chinese Soviet Republic was declared a sovereign state and Geyuan was named the capital of one of its constituent parts, the Northeastern Jiangxi Soviet. In December the following year, the Soviet territory officially expanded into counties in Zhejiang and Fujian.

In November 1934, Geyuan was occupied by Chinese government forces.
