= Zeng Xisheng =

Chinese politician

- 曾希聖
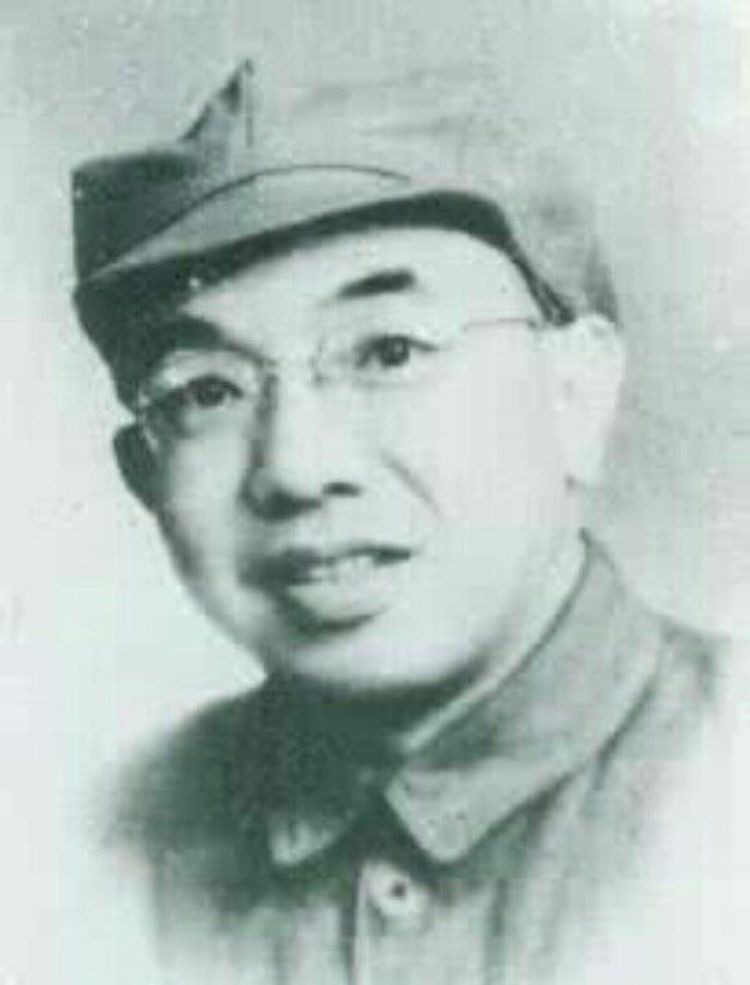

Second Secretary of the East China Bureau
- In office February 1962 – August 1965

Secretary of the Southwest China Bureau
- In office August 1965 – Unknown

First Secretary of Anhui
- In office January 1952 – February 1962
- Preceded by: Office established
- Succeeded by: Li Baohua

First Secretary of Shandong
- In office 1960–1962
- Preceded by: Shu Tong
- Succeeded by: Tan Qilong

Chairman of Anhui
- In office August 1952 – March 1955
- Preceded by: Office established
- Succeeded by: Huang Yan

Personal details
- Born: Chen Shaoyu; 11 October 1904 Zixing, Hunan, Qing dynasty
- Died: 15 July 1968 (aged 63) Beijing
- Party: Chinese Communist Party
- Spouse: Meng Qingshu (孟庆树)
- Occupation: Politician

Zeng Xisheng (Chinese: 曾希聖) (October 11, 1904 – July 15, 1968) was a Chinese politician. He was born in Xingning, Hunan Province (now Zixing, Hunan Province). He was the first Chinese Communist Party Committee Secretary of Anhui Province and also its 1st governor after the founding of the People's Republic of China. He was the 5th Party Secretary of Shandong.

Zeng was a proponent of the Great Leap Forward, but as Anhui became one of the first provinces to sink into famine, Zeng in 1961 allowed for farmers to rent land for private use, like growing crops. The land was recollectivized in the following years. In 1962 he was criticized during the Seven Thousand Cadres Conference and replaced by Li Baohua and transferred out of Anhui to take on the office of Second Secretary of the Southeast Bureau. He died in 1968 during the Cultural Revolution, as his prior actions had been considered anti-revolutionary.

Military offices
New title	First Political Commissar of the Anhui Military District; 1952–1962	Succeeded by Li Baohua
Government offices
New title	Governor of Anhui; 1952–1955	Succeeded by Huang Yan
Party political offices
New title	First Secretary of Anhui; 1952–1962	Succeeded by Li Baohua
Preceded by Shu Tong	First Secretary of Shandong; 1960–1961	Succeeded by Tan Qilong
Assembly seats
New title	Chairman of the Anhui Provincial Committee of the Chinese People's Political Consultative Conference; 1955–1962	Succeeded by Li Baohua
