= Li Jinhua (politician) =

Chinese politician

Li Jinhua (simplified Chinese: 李金华; traditional Chinese: 李金華; pinyin: Lǐ Jīnhuá; born July 1943) is a retired government official in the People's Republic of China.

== Biography ==
Li Jinhua was born in Rudong, Jiangsu in 1943. In 1963, he was admitted to the Central Institute of Finance and Economics. After graduating in the fall of 1966, Li was dispatched to the mountainous Shaanxi province to teach at the Northwest Institute of Finance and Economics. In 1971, Li Jinhua became an accountant for the aircraft factory number 572 in Shaanxi. He worked there for the next 14 years, and rose to become the factory's director. In 1985, Li became the Deputy Auditor General. Li became the Auditor-General of the National Audit Office in 1998, and was appointed to his second term in 2003. He was named Person of the Year by Southern Weekend in 2004 for his leading role in the audit storm.

In 2010 Li wrote an article in the People's Daily, calling for better legal structures and greater supervision over the business dealings of officials and their children. He said the rapidly growing wealth of Communist officials' children and family members "is what the public is most dissatisfied about".

Political offices
| Preceded by Guo Zhenqian | Auditor-General of the National Audit Office; 1998–2008 | Succeeded by Liu Jiayi |
