= Fang Zhimin (opera) =

The NCPA official making-of film, with excerpts from the dress rehearsal

Fang Zhimin is a Western-style Chinese opera by composer Meng Weidong to a libretto by Feng Baiming and Feng Bilie based on the life of communist martyr Fang Zhimin. It was premiered on 28 September 2015. The opera was the ninth opera commission for the Chinese National Centre for the Performing Arts (NCPA). The NCPA released a making-of DVD featuring the dress rehearsal to the production in 2017. A concert performance at the NCPA in Beijing in December 2015 was conducted by Lü Jia.
