= Su Yiran =

Chinese revolutionary and politician (1918–2021)

- 苏毅然

Member of the Central Advisory Commission
- In office 1 November 1987 – 18 October 1992
- Chairman: Chen Yun

Party Secretary of Shandong
- In office December 1982 – June 1985
- Preceded by: Bai Rubing
- Succeeded by: Liang Buting

Governor of Shandong
- In office December 1979 – December 1982
- Preceded by: Bai Rubing
- Succeeded by: Liang Buting

Personal details
- Born: 5 November 1918 Cangxi County, Sichuan, China
- Died: 7 June 2021 (aged 102) Jinan, Shandong, China
- Party: Chinese Communist Party
- Spouse: Zhang Junliang
- Education: Central Party School of the Chinese Communist Party; Yan'an Marxism Leninism College

Military service
- Allegiance: Chinese Communist Party
- Branch/service: Chinese Red Army
- Years of service: 1933–1945
- Battles/wars: Long March

Chinese name
- Traditional Chinese: 蘇毅然
- Simplified Chinese: 苏毅然
Transcriptions
Standard Mandarin
- Hanyu Pinyin: Sū Yìrán

Su Yiran (Chinese: 苏毅然; 5 November 1918 – 7 June 2021) was a Chinese revolutionary and politician. He served as party secretary of Shandong from 1982 to 1985, and governor of Shandong from 1979 to 1982. He was a member of the 11th and 12th Central Committee of the Chinese Communist Party. He was a delegate to the 10th National Congress of the Chinese Communist Party.

== Biography ==
Su was born in the town of Longshan, Cangxi County, Sichuan, on 5 November 1918. He joined the Communist revolution in June 1933. He joined the Communist Youth League of China in February 1936 and the Chinese Communist Party in January 1937. During the Chinese Civil War, he took part in the Long March. After he arrived in Yan'an, Shaanxi, he was accepted to the Central Party School of the Chinese Communist Party and Yan'an Marxism Leninism College. In 1939, he was transferred to north China's Hebei province, he successively served as deputy party chief and party chief of Laiyuan County, Mancheng County, and Wan County, and director of Zhangjiakou Public Security Bureau.

After the founding of the Communist State in 1949, he was appointed director of Anhui Public Security Department. In April 1955, he became a member of the Standing Committee of the CPC Anhui Provincial Committee. He was vice governor of Anhui in May 1956 before being assigned to the similar position in the neighboring Shandong province in 1960. In 1966, Mao Zedong launched the Cultural Revolution, he suffered political persecution. In June 1970, he was reinstated as vice governor of the Shandong Revolutionary Committee. He served as deputy party chief of Shandong from April 1971 to January 1977, and party chief, the top political position in the province, from December 1982 to June 1985. He was governor of Shandong between December 1979 and December 1982. On 1 November 1987, he was elected a member of the Central Advisory Commission.

On 7 June 2021, Su Yiran died in Jinan, Shandong, aged 102.

Government offices
Preceded by Bai Rubing	Governor of Shandong; 1979–1982	Succeeded by Liang Buting
Party political offices
Preceded by Bai Rubing	Party Secretary of Shandong; 1982–1985	Succeeded by Liang Buting
Military offices
Preceded by Liu Lian	Political Commissar of the Shandong Military District; 1983–1985	Succeeded by Cao Pengsheng
