= Audit storm =

Phrase used by Chinese media to describe auditing campaigns

Audit storm (Chinese: 审计风暴) was a phrase that Chinese media coined to describe the auditing campaigns initiated by the National Audit Office of China.

In 2003, Auditor General Li Jinhua presented the annual audit report to the Standing Committee of the National People's Congress. He openly disclosed the severe irregularities committed by many ministries and other government agencies. This report was posted to the official website of the NAO. It was the first time that the audit report was published to the public. This received significant public attention and was labelled as "audit storm".

In June 2004, Li Jinhua again submitted bold auditing report to the NPC's Standing Committee and disclosed many major problems in government. Nearly 600 people were punished for being involved in irregularities.

The term of "audit storm" was coined in 2003 for the NAO's audit report of that year. Later, Auditor General Li Jinhua retroactively named the 1999 audit report as the first audit storm.

In July 2004, audit storm was elected as one of the top ten popular terms used in Chinese newspapers in spring and summer 2004.
