= Li Xifu =

Chinese military officer who served as general in the People's Liberation Army

Li Xifu (Chinese: 黎锡福; 1909 – 29 May 1976) was a Chinese military officer who served as general in the People's Liberation Army.

He was a former deputy commander of the 13th Army of the Chinese People's Liberation Army. In 1955, he was awarded the rank of major general of the Chinese People's Liberation Army. He served as the Kunming Military Region Deputy Chief of Staff, Yunnan Military Region commander, and Shandong Province Military District commander. He died in 1976, at the age of 67.

Military offices
Preceded by Tong Guogui	Commander of the PLA Shandong Military District; 1975–1976	Succeeded by Zhao Feng
