= Wu Chuanxi =

Chinese academic

Wu Chuanxi (吴传喜) served as the President of Hubei University in Hubei, China from 2000 to 2011.

He received his Ph.D. from Peking University in 1988. In January 2000, at 38 years old, he was appointed President of Hubei University, making him the youngest university President in China at the time.
