= Cao Juru =

Cao Juru (Chinese: 曹菊如) (May 1901 – January 1981) was the 2nd governor of the People's Bank of China (1954–1964). He was born in Longyan, Fujian Province. He joined the Chinese Communist Party in 1930.

Preceded by Nan Hanchen	Governor of the People's Bank of China; 1954–1964	Succeeded by Hu Lijiao
