= Nan Hanchen =

Chinese politician

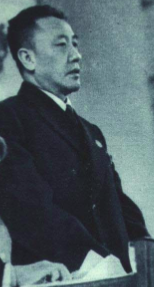
Nan Hanchen in Moscow (May 1952)

Nan Hanchen (simplified Chinese: 南汉宸; traditional Chinese: 南漢宸; 1895 – January 27, 1967) was the first governor of the People's Bank of China (1949–1954).

== Biography ==
He was born in Hongdong County, Linfen, Shanxi Province. He died during the Cultural Revolution. He was a delegate to the 1st National People's Congress, 2nd National People's Congress and 3rd National People's Congress.

Preceded by New office	Governor of the People's Bank of China; 1949–1954	Succeeded by Cao Juru
