= Xiang Ming =

Chinese politician

Xiang Ming (Chinese: 向明) (1909–1969) was a Chinese politician. He was born in Linqu County, Shandong Province. In 1937, at the start of the Second United Front, he was Liu Shaoqi's secretary. He was active in Henan Province and northern Jiangsu Province. After the beginning of the second phase of the Chinese Civil War, he participated in the Menglianggu Campaign of May 1947. He was briefly mayor of Qingdao before becoming Chinese Communist Party Committee Secretary of his home province. In 1954, Xiang became involved in an anti-party conspiracy led by Gao Gang and Rao Shushi. On July 3, 1954, the central government initiated proceedings to remove Xiang from his post as Party Chief of Shandong. On September 7, 1954, the Shandong Party Committee informed the central government of its acceptance of Xiang's removal. On October 10, 1954, Xiang was formally removed as Party Chief of Shandong and banned from political office. During the Cultural Revolution, Xiang was persecuted and died as a result.

== Bibliography ==
- Jing Huang. Factionalism in Chinese Communist Politics
- Anthony Pecotich, Clifford J. Shultz. Politics at Mao's Court: Gao Gang and Party Factionalism in the Early 1950s.
- Frederick C. Teiwes. Politics and Purges in China: Rectification and the Decline of Party Norms.
- 向明. 潍坊市档案馆. [2011-10-06].
- 【史海】 向明事件—共和国建立后山东最大的冤案. 炎黄春秋. [2011-10-06].

| Preceded by Fu Qiutao | Communist Party Chief of Shandong | Succeeded by Shu Tong |
