= Hubei University =

Public university in Wuhan, Hubei, China

Coordinates: 30.5605°N 114.3175°E

- 湖北大学
- Motto: 日思日睿 笃志笃行
- Type: Public
- Established: 1931
- Location: Wuhan, Hubei, China
- Campus: Urban, 1,800 mu (1.2 km2)
- Website: www.hubu.edu.cn

Hubei University (湖北大学) is a public university in Wuhan, Hubei, China.

The institute was founded in 1931 as Hubei Provincial Education College. The college moved between locations and changed its name several times during its half-century of development. Since 1984, it was renamed Hubei University.

== History ==
- 1984 – Present: Hubei University (湖北大学)
- 1958 – 1984: Wuhan Teachers College (武汉师范学院)
- 1957 – 1958: Wuhan Teachers Vocational School (武汉师范专科学校)
- 1954 – 1957: Hubei Teachers Vocational School (湖北师范专科学校)
- 1952 – 1954: Hubei Teachers Vocational College (湖北省教师进修学院)
- 1949 – 1952: Hubei Education College (湖北省教育学院)
- 1944 – 1949: National Hubei Teachers College (国立湖北师范学院)
- 1931 – 1943: Hubei Provincial Education College (湖北省立教育学院)

== Notable faculty ==
- Andrew Jacobs, former English teacher
- Wu Chuanxi, youngest university President in China at the time of his appointment
