= Shu Tong =

Chinese calligrapher and politician

- 舒同
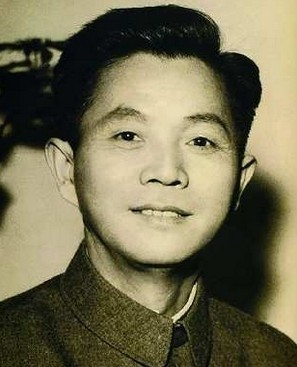
- Shu Tong in the 1950s

Party Secretary of Shandong
- In office August 1954 – October 1960

Personal details
- Born: November 25, 1905 Dongxiang County, Jiangxi
- Died: May 27, 1998 (aged 92) Beijing
- Party: Chinese Communist Party
- Spouse(s): Wei Furong, Fang Lin, Shi Lan, Wang Yunfei
- Children: Shu Guanguan, Shu An

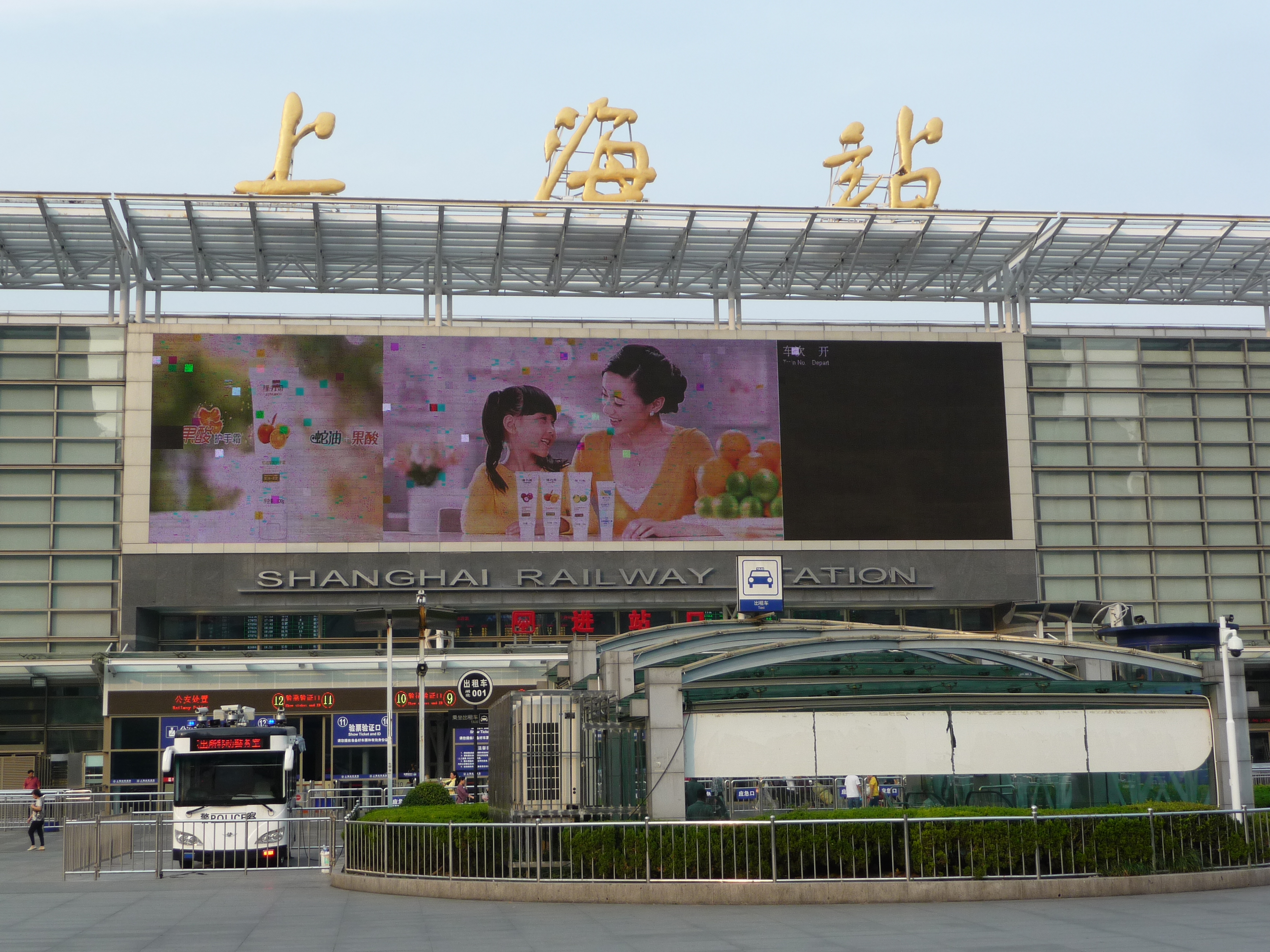
The calligraphy of Shu Tong at Shanghai railway station

Shu Tong (November 25, 1905 – May 27, 1998) was a Chinese politician. He was born in Dongxiang County, Jiangxi Province (part of Fuzhou, Jiangxi Province). He joined the Chinese Communist Party in 1926. He was the Party Secretary of Shandong. In 1944 he was tasked to lead the Rectification Campaign excesses in Shandong. He died in Beijing.

Shu Tong was also reputed for his calligraphy.

Preceded by Xiang Ming	Party Secretary of Shandong	Succeeded by Zeng Xisheng
