= Fu Qiutao =

Chinese general and politician (1907–1981)

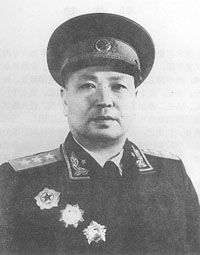

Fu Qiutao (Chinese: 傅秋涛) (August 3, 1907 – August 25, 1981) was a Chinese politician and a senior general of the People's Liberation Army. He was born in Pingjiang County, Hunan Province. He was vice-governor and the 2nd Chinese Communist Party Committee Secretary of Shandong Province. He was a delegate to the 3rd, 4th and 5th National People's Congress.

Preceded by Kang Sheng	Communist Party Chief of Shandong	Succeeded by Xiang Ming
