= Chen Xiyu =

Chinese politician

Chen Xiyu (Chinese: 陈希愈) (July 1911 – July 2000) was the 4th governor of the People's Bank of China (1973–1978). He was born in Huozhou, Linfen, Shanxi Province. He joined the Chinese Communist Party in 1936.

Preceded by Vacant since 1966, last held by Hu Lijiao	Governor of the People's Bank of China; 1973–1978	Succeeded by Li Baohua
