= Yanshan County, Jiangxi =

Coordinates: 28.3181°N 117.704°E

Yanshan 铅山县
- County
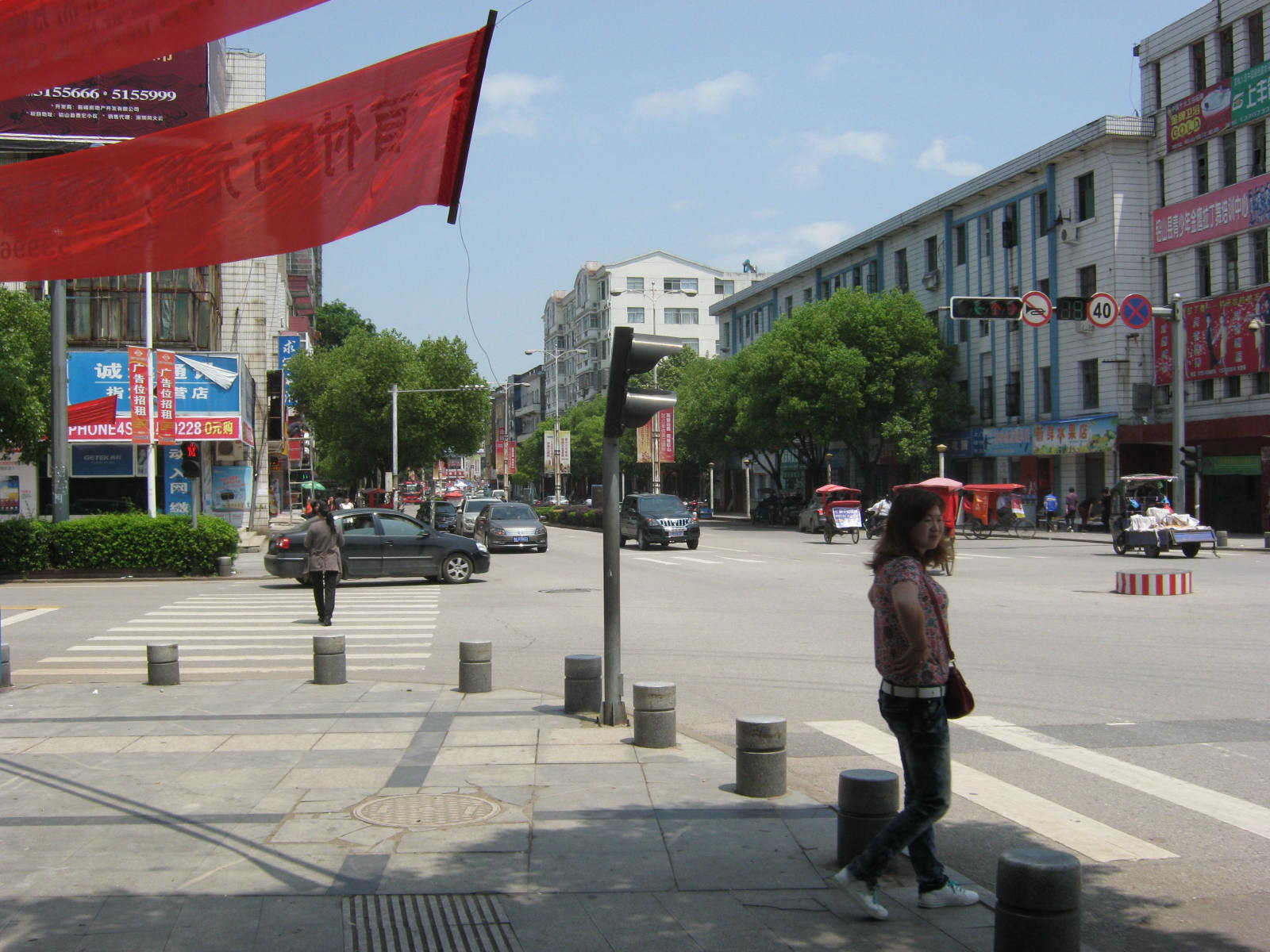
- Shijiang Avenue (狮江大道)

- Location in Jiangxi
- Country: People's Republic of China
- Province: Jiangxi
- Prefecture-level city: Shangrao

Area
  - Total: 2,178 km^{2} (841 sq mi)

Population (2019)
  - Total: 481,700
  - Density: 221.2/km^{2} (572.8/sq mi)
- Time zone: UTC+8 (China Standard)
- Postal code: 334500

Yanshan (Chinese: 铅山; pinyin: Yánshān, also pronounced Qiānshān) is a county in Shangrao Municipality, in north-eastern Jiangxi province.

== Name ==
The first character in this county's name (铅) is normally pronounced qiān, but in the local dialect it is pronounced as yán. The local pronunciation is what is generally used.

== Situation ==
It borders Hengfeng County to the north, Shangrao County to the east, Wannian County, Yiyang County and Guixi City (in Yingtan) to the west and Wuyishan City and Guangze County (both in Nanping, FJ) to the south.

=== Waterways ===
Hekou town sits on the Xinjiang River (信江), a tributary to Boyang Lake in the lower Yangzi River watershed.

== Administration ==
The county seat, by Chinese convention often also called Yanshan, is at Hekou town (河口镇).

=== 7 Towns (镇, zhen) ===
- Hekou (河口镇)
- Yongping (永平镇)
- Shitang (石塘镇)
- Ehu (鹅湖镇)
- Hufang (湖坊镇)
- Wuyishan (武夷山镇)
- Wang'er (汪二镇)

=== 8 Townships (乡, xiang) ===
- Chenfang (陈坊乡)
- Hongqiao (虹桥乡)
- Xintan (新滩乡)
- Gexianshan (葛仙山乡)
- Jiaxuan (稼轩乡)
- Yingjiang (英将乡)
- Zixi (紫溪乡)
- Tianzhushan (天柱山乡)

=== 2 Ethnic Townships (族乡, zu xiang) ===
- She Taiyuan (太源畲族乡)
- She Huangbi (篁碧畲族乡)

== Climate ==
Climate data for Yanshan, elevation 100 m (330 ft), (1991–2020 normals, extremes 1951–present)
Month	Jan	Feb	Mar	Apr	May	Jun	Jul	Aug	Sep	Oct	Nov	Dec	Year
Record high °C (°F)	26.7 (80.1)	30.1 (86.2)	35.4 (95.7)	35.5 (95.9)	37.3 (99.1)	38.5 (101.3)	40.8 (105.4)	42.1 (107.8)	39.5 (103.1)	39.7 (103.5)	33.6 (92.5)	28.4 (83.1)	42.1 (107.8)
Mean daily maximum °C (°F)	10.8 (51.4)	13.7 (56.7)	17.5 (63.5)	23.8 (74.8)	28.4 (83.1)	30.6 (87.1)	34.9 (94.8)	34.4 (93.9)	30.9 (87.6)	25.9 (78.6)	19.7 (67.5)	13.5 (56.3)	23.7 (74.6)
Daily mean °C (°F)	6.7 (44.1)	9.1 (48.4)	12.8 (55.0)	18.6 (65.5)	23.3 (73.9)	26.1 (79.0)	29.8 (85.6)	29.2 (84.6)	25.8 (78.4)	20.6 (69.1)	14.6 (58.3)	8.7 (47.7)	18.8 (65.8)
Mean daily minimum °C (°F)	4.0 (39.2)	6.0 (42.8)	9.5 (49.1)	14.9 (58.8)	19.6 (67.3)	22.8 (73.0)	25.7 (78.3)	25.4 (77.7)	22.1 (71.8)	16.7 (62.1)	11.0 (51.8)	5.4 (41.7)	15.3 (59.5)
Record low °C (°F)	−8.1 (17.4)	−7.8 (18.0)	−1.9 (28.6)	2.5 (36.5)	9.0 (48.2)	13.5 (56.3)	18.4 (65.1)	19.6 (67.3)	14.0 (57.2)	3.3 (37.9)	−2.4 (27.7)	−10.6 (12.9)	−10.6 (12.9)
Average precipitation mm (inches)	94.5 (3.72)	113.8 (4.48)	222.2 (8.75)	244.0 (9.61)	256.9 (10.11)	396.8 (15.62)	177.4 (6.98)	143.9 (5.67)	73.9 (2.91)	50.4 (1.98)	98.2 (3.87)	77.4 (3.05)	1,949.4 (76.75)
Average precipitation days (≥ 0.1 mm)	14.2	13.9	18.7	17.6	17.0	17.9	12.1	12.6	9.2	8.0	10.2	11.1	162.5
Average snowy days	1.8	1.4	0.2	0	0	0	0	0	0	0	0	0.8	4.2
Average relative humidity (%)	78	77	78	76	76	80	73	74	74	72	76	76	76
Mean monthly sunshine hours	83.2	84.0	90.4	115.4	138.4	125.2	219.8	203.8	167.8	159.9	126.0	119.4	1,633.3
Percentage possible sunshine	25	26	24	30	33	30	52	51	46	45	39	37	37
Source: China Meteorological Administration

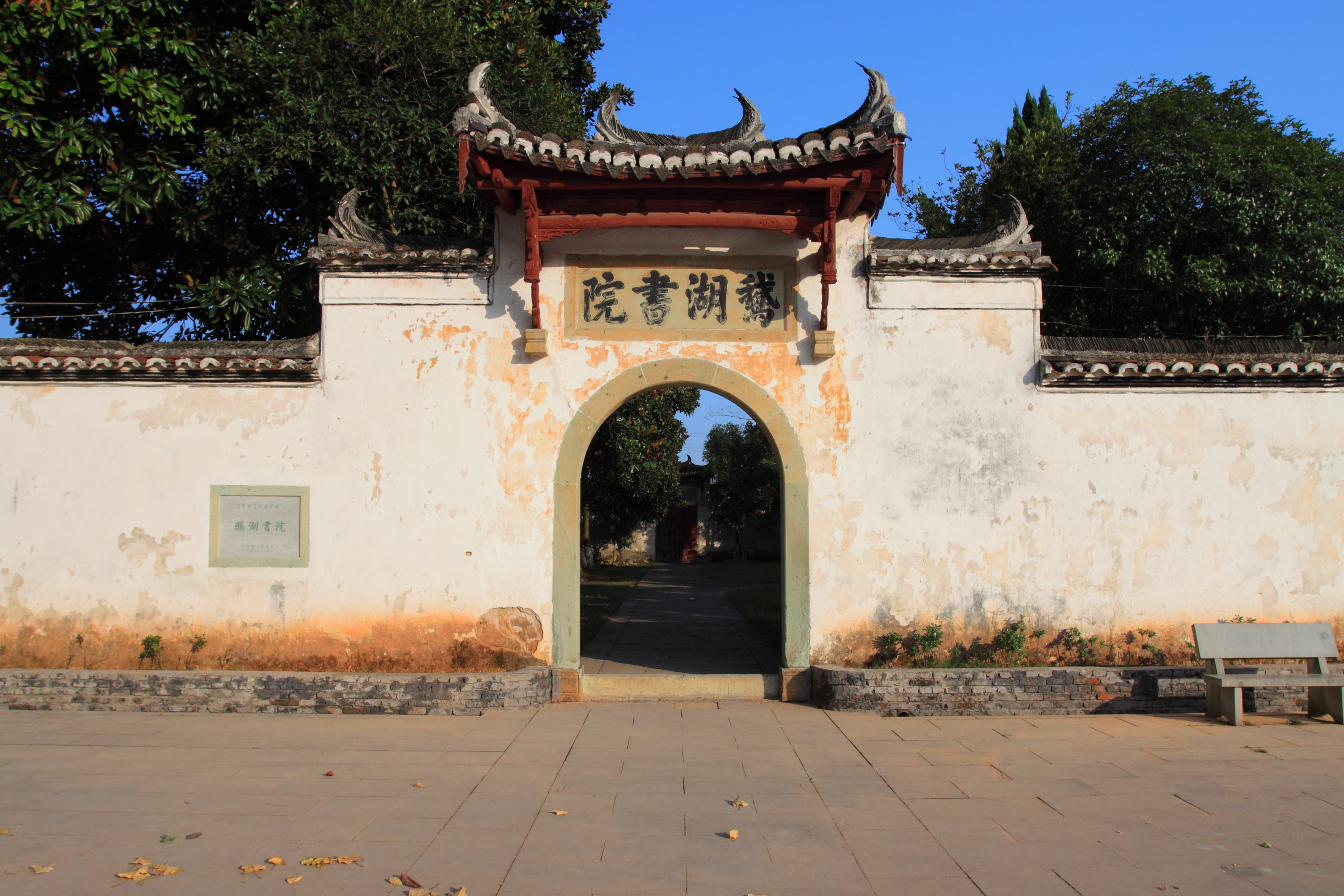
Ehu Academy
