= Huang Dao =

Chinese Communist Party member

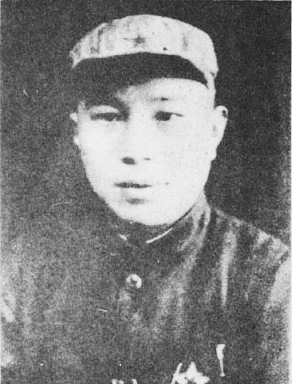
Huang Dao

Huang Dao (Chinese: 黄道; April 25, 1900 – May 23, 1939) original name Huang Duanzhang (Chinese: 黄端章), also known as Yiming (Chinese: 一鸣) was a member of the Chinese Workers' and Peasants' Red Army and the New Fourth Army. He was born in Hengfeng County, Jiangxi Province. He was the father of Huang Zhizhen, who was governor of Hubei Province under the People's Republic of China. He fought in the Chinese Civil War on the side of the Chinese Communist Party, being active in northern and eastern Fujian near the border with Zhejiang. He remained in southern China after the Long March. During the Second Sino-Japanese War, he was poisoned by the Kuomintang en route to southern Anhui.
