= Hu Lijiao =

Chinese politician

Hu Lijiao (Chinese: 胡立教) (December 1914 – July 3, 2006) was a Chinese politician. He was born in Ji'an, Jiangxi Province. He was the 3rd governor of the People's Bank of China (1964–1966) and the 1st Chairman of the People's Standing Congress of Henan Province (1979–1981) and 2nd Chairman of the People's Standing Congress of Shanghai (1981–1988).

Preceded by Cao Juru	Governor of the People's Bank of China; 1964–1966	Succeeded by Vacant until 1973, next held by Chen Xiyu
Preceded by New office	Chairman of the People's Congress of Henan; 1979–1981	Succeeded by Liu Jie
Preceded by Yan Youmin	Chairman of the People's Congress of Shanghai; 1981–1988	Succeeded by Ye Gongqi
