= Laoting County =

Laoting County 乐亭县 Loting
- County
- Location in Hebei
- Coordinates: 39°26′N 118°55′E
- Country: People's Republic of China
- Province: Hebei
- Prefecture-level city: Tangshan
- Township-level divisions: 1 subdistrict 11 towns 3 townships
- County seat: Chengqu Subdistrict (城区街道)

Area
  - Total: 1,308 km^{2} (505 sq mi)
- Elevation: 12 m (39 ft)

Population (2017)
  - Total: 419,100
  - Density: 320.4/km^{2} (829.9/sq mi)
- Time zone: UTC+8 (China Standard)
- Postal code: 063600
- Website: laoting.gov.cn

Laoting County (simplified Chinese: 乐亭县; traditional Chinese: 樂亭縣; pinyin: Làotíng Xiàn), often mispronounced as Leting County in accordance with the alternative frequently used Mandarin pronunciation, is a county in the northeast of Hebei province, People's Republic of China, facing the Bohai Sea to the east and south. It is under the administration of the prefecture-level city of Tangshan. The county spans an area of 1,308 square kilometres (505 mi^{2}), and, as of 2017, has a population of approximately 419,100.

== History ==
The area of present-day Laoting County has been inhabited since the Neolithic era. During the time of the Shang and Zhou dynasties, the area belonged to the state of Guzhu. During the Qin dynasty, the area was part of Liaoxi Commandery. In the Han and Jin dynasties, it belonged to Ping Prefecture. During the Northern Wei, the area was organized as Lao'an Ting (Chinese: 乐安亭). The area belonged to Macheng County (Chinese: 马城县) during the Tang dynasty.

In 1189, during the Jin dynasty (not to be confused with the earlier, aforementioned Jin dynasty), Laoting County was established, which the area remains organized as to this day.

== Geography and climate ==
Laoting has a monsoon-influenced humid continental climate (Köppen Dwa), with four distinct seasons and some maritime moderation during the summer. Winters are cold and very dry, with a January daily average temperature of −5.8 °C (21.6 °F), while summers are hot and humid, with a July daily average temperature of 24.9 °C (76.8 °F). The annual mean temperature is 10.59 °C (51.06 °F). With the monthly percent possible sunshine ranging from 45% in July to 65% in October, the area receives 2,588 hours of bright sunshine per year. A majority of the annual rainfall occurs in July and August alone.

Climate data for Laoting County, elevation 9 m (30 ft), (1991–2020 normals, extremes 1957–present)
Month	Jan	Feb	Mar	Apr	May	Jun	Jul	Aug	Sep	Oct	Nov	Dec	Year
Record high °C (°F)	12.7 (54.9)	20.1 (68.2)	28.4 (83.1)	30.5 (86.9)	36.4 (97.5)	37.9 (100.2)	38.8 (101.8)	37.2 (99.0)	34.6 (94.3)	30.5 (86.9)	22.2 (72.0)	13.6 (56.5)	38.8 (101.8)
Mean daily maximum °C (°F)	1.2 (34.2)	4.6 (40.3)	11.0 (51.8)	18.6 (65.5)	24.6 (76.3)	28.1 (82.6)	30.1 (86.2)	29.7 (85.5)	26.2 (79.2)	19.1 (66.4)	10.0 (50.0)	2.9 (37.2)	17.2 (62.9)
Daily mean °C (°F)	−4.3 (24.3)	−1.2 (29.8)	5.0 (41.0)	12.5 (54.5)	18.8 (65.8)	22.9 (73.2)	25.8 (78.4)	25.3 (77.5)	20.8 (69.4)	13.3 (55.9)	4.6 (40.3)	−2.0 (28.4)	11.8 (53.2)
Mean daily minimum °C (°F)	−8.5 (16.7)	−5.6 (21.9)	0.4 (32.7)	7.4 (45.3)	13.7 (56.7)	18.6 (65.5)	22.4 (72.3)	21.6 (70.9)	16.2 (61.2)	8.5 (47.3)	0.4 (32.7)	−5.9 (21.4)	7.4 (45.4)
Record low °C (°F)	−23.7 (−10.7)	−21.7 (−7.1)	−20.2 (−4.4)	−4.5 (23.9)	2.0 (35.6)	8.0 (46.4)	13.2 (55.8)	8.9 (48.0)	0.0 (32.0)	−4.6 (23.7)	−19.5 (−3.1)	−20.6 (−5.1)	−23.7 (−10.7)
Average precipitation mm (inches)	2.9 (0.11)	5.8 (0.23)	7.6 (0.30)	21.4 (0.84)	46.0 (1.81)	80.9 (3.19)	148.0 (5.83)	149.5 (5.89)	51.9 (2.04)	33.0 (1.30)	12.7 (0.50)	4.5 (0.18)	564.2 (22.22)
Average precipitation days (≥ 0.1 mm)	2.0	2.5	3.1	5.2	6.1	8.8	10.1	8.8	5.9	4.4	3.3	2.5	62.7
Average snowy days	3.0	2.7	1.2	0.3	0	0	0	0	0	0.1	1.6	2.9	11.8
Average relative humidity (%)	56	57	54	54	59	70	78	79	71	65	62	58	64
Mean monthly sunshine hours	179.9	180.5	229.4	242.7	267.1	228.0	192.8	203.7	215.9	204.1	167.7	164.9	2,476.7
Percentage possible sunshine	59	59	62	61	60	51	43	49	59	60	57	57	56
Source: China Meteorological Administrationextremesall-time August highOctober all-time Record

== Administrative divisions ==
The county administers 1 subdistrict, 11 towns, 2 townships, and 2 other township-level divisions.

The county's sole subdistrict is Lao'an Subdistrict.

The county's 11 towns are Laoting, Tangjiahe, Hujiatuo, Yangezhuang, Matouying, Xinzhai, Tingliuhe, Jianggezhuang, Maozhuang, Zhongbao, and Daxianggezhuang.

The county's 2 townships are Panggezhuang Township and Guhe Township.

Laoting County also administers the township-level divisions of the Hebei Laoting Economic Development Zone (Chinese: 河北乐亭经济开发区) and the Laoting County Urban Industrial Assembly Area (Chinese: 乐亭县城区工业聚集区).

== Demographics ==
As of 2017, it has a population of approximately 419,100. About 112,300 people (26.80% of the population) are aged 60 and older, while 72,700 (17.35%) are 65 and older. The county had 3,358 births in 2017, and 3,183 deaths, giving it a rate of natural increase of 0.41‰ (per mille).

The county's population comprises 30 different recognized ethnic groups, of which, about 6,000 (1.43%) belong to ethnic minorities. Sizeable ethnic minority groups in Laoting County include the Manchu, the Hui, and the Mongols.

== Economy ==
Per a 2020 government publication, urban residents have a per capita disposable income of 36,980 renminbi (RMB), an 8.5% increase from the previous year, while rural residents average a disposable income of 17,570 RMB, a 9.2% year-over-year increase.
