= National Audit Office (China) =

Chinese government audit agency

National Audit Office of the People's Republic of China
- 中华人民共和国审计署; Zhōnghuá Rénmín Gònghéguó Shěnjìshǔ
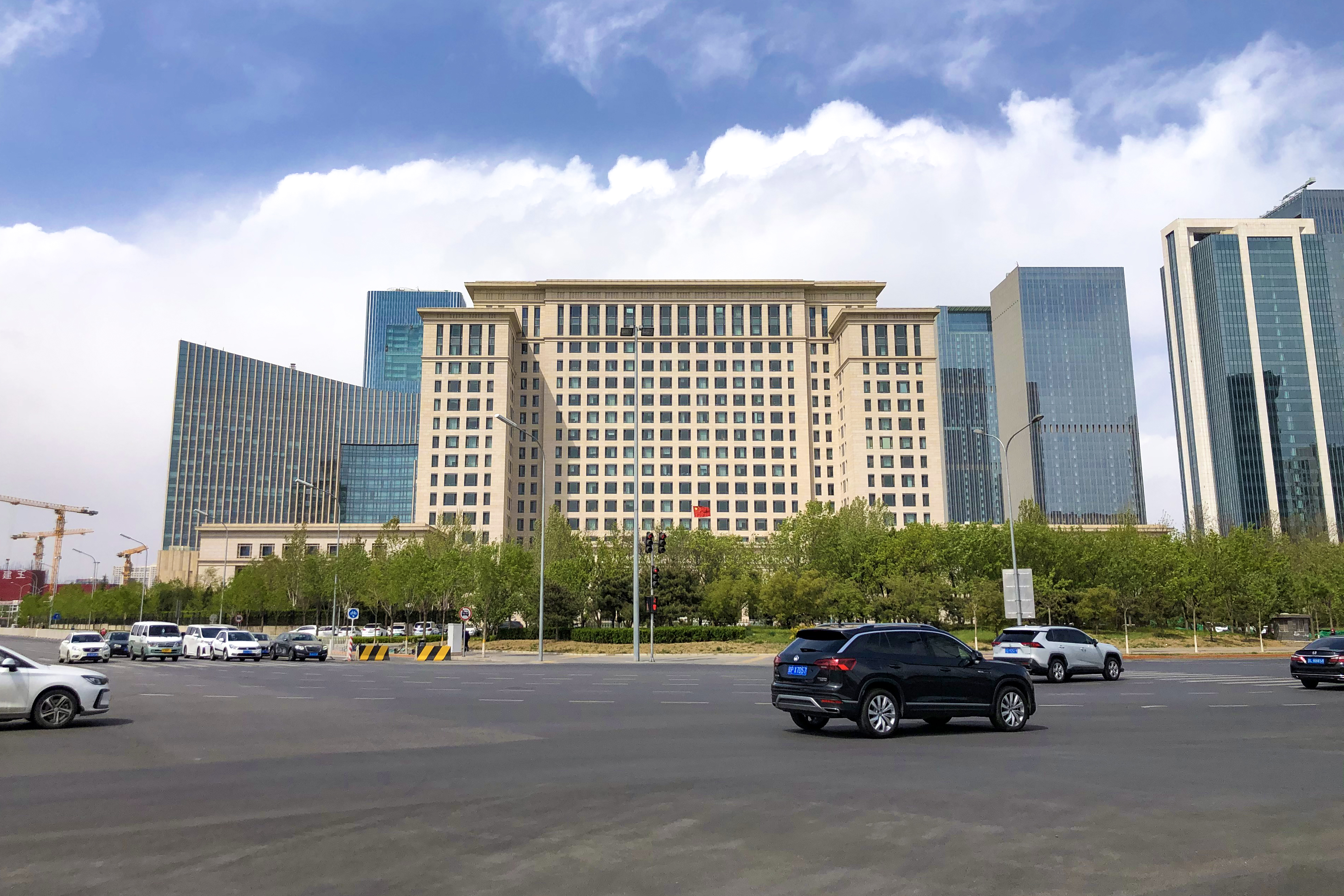

Agency overview
- Formed: June 1983; 43 years ago
- Type: Constituent Department of the State Council (cabinet-level)
- Jurisdiction: China
- Headquarters: Beijing
- Agency executive: Hou Kai, Auditor-General
- Parent agency: State Council
- Website: www.audit.gov.cn

The National Audit Office of the People's Republic of China is the supreme audit institution in the People's Republic of China. It was established in 1983 according to the Constitution. It is a cabinet-level executive department of the State Council and under the leadership of the premier.

== History ==
As part of the 2018 institutional reforms, the National Audit Office acquired powers from other government bodies to inspect major projects, state-owned enterprises, central budgets, as well as central revenues and expenditures.

== Functions ==
The Office is responsible auditing the finances of the State Council and of provincial governments and public institutions that receive central government funds. It additionally conducts audits on natural resources and environmental performance. The Office of the Central Auditing Commission of the Chinese Communist Party is located within the National Audit Office.

== See also ==
- "Audit storm" (Chinese: 审计风暴)
- Audit Office of the Central Military Commission
- National Supervisory Commission
- Ministries of the People's Republic of China
- National Audit Office (United Kingdom)
