= Fang Zhimin =

Chinese communist (1899–1935)

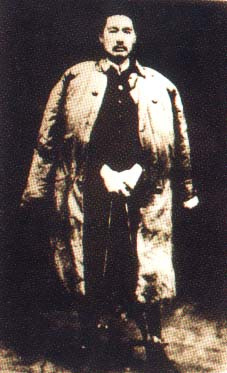
Fang Zhimin

Fang Zhimin (Chinese: 方志敏, Wade–Giles: Fang Chih Min; 21 August 1899 – 6 August 1935) was a Chinese communist military and political leader.

== Life ==
Fang was born in 1899 to a poor peasant household in Qigong town, part of Yiyang County, Jiangxi Province.

To propagate Marxism, Fang enrolled at Xinyuan University and in early 1922 opened the Nanchang Culture Book Society. The Book Society's storefront contained social sciences publications and it sold texts such as the Communist Manifesto, The ABC of Communism, and periodicals like The Guide Weekly in its back room. The Book Society's back room also served as a study space for progressive students. In March 1923, the Jiangxi governor shut down the book store, threatening to locate and arrest its "Marxist Manager".

Fang joined the Chinese Communist Party in 1924. In April of that year, Fang and Zhao Xingnong established a party contact point at Yiping Printing House, which laid the foundation for the establishment of the party's Nanchang Branch.

In 1924, workers at Derong Printing House went on strike to demand higher wages. Fang organized the Nanchang Lead Printers' Union to support the Derong Printing House workers through an industry-wide general strike.

After the failure of the Shanghai Uprising in 1927, Fang returned to Jiangxi, where he worked in organizing the peasantry and urged them to take part in armed uprisings.

In August 1930, Fang founded the Workers and Peasants' Newspaper in Jiangxi. In November 1932, the newspaper became the official newspaper of the Fujian-Zhejiang-Jiangxi Soviet Government and moved to Geyuan in Hengfeng County.

From 1928 to 1933 Fang conducted guerrilla operations, enacted land reforms, established a base area in the border area of Jiangxi and Fujian provinces, and organized a section of the Chinese Red Army.

== Death ==
Fang was later elected a member of the Central Committee during the sixth session of the Fifth Party Congress. Fang was captured by the Kuomintang in January 1935 and executed on August 6, 1935. The 2015 opera Fang Zhimin commemorates his life and death.

Preceded by Zhu Guangming	Chairman of the Northeastern Jiangxi Soviet; 1930–1932	Succeeded by Office abolished; merged into Fujian-Zhejiang-Jiangxi Soviet
Preceded by Himself as Chairman of Northeastern Jiangxi Soviet	Chairman of the Fujian-Zhejiang-Jiangxi Soviet; 1932–1935	Succeeded by Office abolished, dissolution of Soviet
