= Hengfeng County =

Hengfeng 横峰县
- County
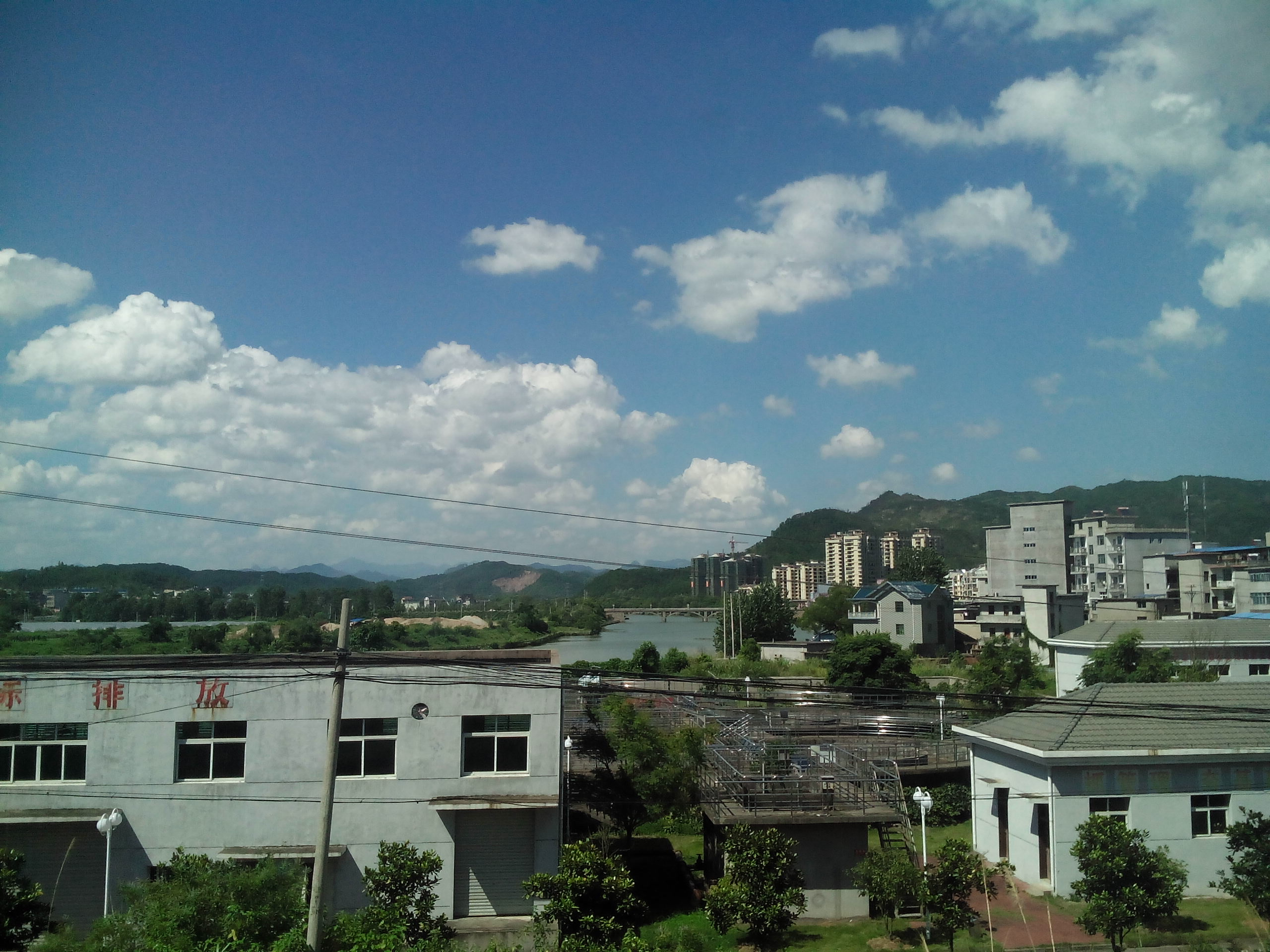

- Location in Jiangxi
- Coordinates: 28.4156°N 117.603°E
- Country: People's Republic of China
- Province: Jiangxi
- Prefecture-level city: Shangrao

Area
  - Total: 655 km^{2} (253 sq mi)

Population (2018)
  - Total: 228,900
  - Density: 349/km^{2} (905/sq mi)
- Time zone: UTC+8 (China Standard)
- Postal code: 334300

Hengfeng County (simplified Chinese: 横峰; traditional Chinese: 橫峰; pinyin: Héngfēng) is a small county under the administration of Shangrao city, Jiangxi province, China. It is located in the centre of Shangrao city, about 30 km (19 mi) from Shangrao Xinzhou District which is the locality of the municipality.

== History ==
Hengfeng county was set up in the 39th year of the Ming Jiajing Reign (1560) with the name Xing'an (兴安县). Its first mandarin was Chen Qingyun (陈庆云), who assumed office that year.

In the 3rd year of the Republic of China (1914), the name of the county was changed from Xing'an to Hengfeng in order to eliminate ambiguity with the like-named county in Guilin Municipality, Guangxi.

In the 1930s Hengfeng was the centre of the Northeastern Jiangxi Revolutionary Base Area, later NEJX Soviet.

== Geography ==
The Hengfeng county's east–west distance is 28.3 km (17.6 mi), and the north–south is 50.3 km (31.3 mi). The total area is 655.24 km^{2} (252.99 sq mi) by aircraft measure. The highest mountain is Mopan Mountain (磨盘山) with its peak altitude 1,366.6 m (4,484 ft). Xinjiang River, the main river across Shangrao city, lies in the county for 9.82 km (6.10 mi). Cengang River runs across the county. The county's intensity of river grid is 0.2 km/square km.

== Administrative divisions ==
At present, Hengfeng County has 1 subdistrict, 2 towns and 6 townships.

1 subdistrict

- Xing'an (兴安街道)

2 towns

- Cenyang (岑阳镇)
- Geyuan (葛源镇)

6 townships

- Yaojia (姚家乡)
- Lianhe (莲荷乡)
- Sipu (司铺乡)
- Gangbian (港边乡)
- Longmenfan (龙门畈乡)
- Qingban (青板乡)

== Climate ==
Climate data for Hengfeng, elevation 79 m (259 ft), (1991–2020 normals, extremes 1981–2010)
Month	Jan	Feb	Mar	Apr	May	Jun	Jul	Aug	Sep	Oct	Nov	Dec	Year
Record high °C (°F)	26.9 (80.4)	29.9 (85.8)	35.2 (95.4)	35.2 (95.4)	36.8 (98.2)	38.1 (100.6)	40.6 (105.1)	41.2 (106.2)	38.7 (101.7)	37.7 (99.9)	32.6 (90.7)	26.5 (79.7)	41.2 (106.2)
Mean daily maximum °C (°F)	10.9 (51.6)	13.9 (57.0)	17.7 (63.9)	23.9 (75.0)	28.3 (82.9)	30.6 (87.1)	34.8 (94.6)	34.4 (93.9)	30.9 (87.6)	26.1 (79.0)	19.9 (67.8)	13.7 (56.7)	23.8 (74.8)
Daily mean °C (°F)	6.7 (44.1)	9.2 (48.6)	12.9 (55.2)	18.6 (65.5)	23.4 (74.1)	26.2 (79.2)	29.8 (85.6)	29.4 (84.9)	26.0 (78.8)	20.8 (69.4)	14.6 (58.3)	8.7 (47.7)	18.9 (65.9)
Mean daily minimum °C (°F)	3.8 (38.8)	6.0 (42.8)	9.4 (48.9)	14.8 (58.6)	19.6 (67.3)	22.8 (73.0)	25.8 (78.4)	25.6 (78.1)	22.1 (71.8)	16.8 (62.2)	10.9 (51.6)	5.3 (41.5)	15.2 (59.4)
Record low °C (°F)	−5.5 (22.1)	−3.6 (25.5)	−2.6 (27.3)	2.9 (37.2)	9.8 (49.6)	13.9 (57.0)	19.5 (67.1)	20.0 (68.0)	13.9 (57.0)	3.3 (37.9)	−1.1 (30.0)	−9.8 (14.4)	−9.8 (14.4)
Average precipitation mm (inches)	96.9 (3.81)	117.0 (4.61)	217.1 (8.55)	254.3 (10.01)	251.3 (9.89)	411.8 (16.21)	184.3 (7.26)	142.5 (5.61)	80.7 (3.18)	49.7 (1.96)	105.4 (4.15)	76.2 (3.00)	1,987.2 (78.24)
Average precipitation days (≥ 0.1 mm)	14.8	14.4	18.5	17.4	16.7	17.5	12.0	12.7	9.1	8.1	10.1	11.2	162.5
Average snowy days	2.0	1.5	0.2	0	0	0	0	0	0	0	0	0.8	4.5
Average relative humidity (%)	77	75	77	75	74	78	71	72	71	70	74	75	74
Mean monthly sunshine hours	79.1	82.5	89.1	111.6	130.8	118.7	211.5	200.0	169.9	158.2	126.9	116.6	1,594.9
Percentage possible sunshine	24	26	24	29	31	29	50	50	46	45	40	37	36
Source: China Meteorological Administration

== Celebrities ==
In the last century, the main celebrities are Fang Zhimin and Shao Shiping.

=== Fang Zhimin (方志敏) ===
Fang, born 1900 in Yiyang County, Jiangxi Province, led revolution in Jiangxi with Communism faith and Marxism theory, who had the same prestige with Mao Zedong at that time. Fang and Shao Shiping had successfully launched Yiyang-Hengfeng Uprising and built the Northeast Jiangxi Revolution Base. But unfortunately he was captured by the Kuomintang troops in the Huaiyu Mountains, Yushan County, Jiangxi in his adult age in 1935 and killed in Nanchang in the same year. In prison he wrote is his masterpiece 'Lovely China' and influenced a number of revolutionaries.

=== Shao Shiping (邵式平) ===
Shao (1900–1965), also born in Yiyang County, was also reputed for the revolution. After the foundation of People's Republic of China in 1949, he was the initial province stadholder of Jiangxi. With Fang, Shao had successfully launched the Yiyang-Hengfeng Uprising and built the Northeast Jiangxi Revolution Base.

== Population ==
Until 2005, the population is about 200,000, most of which work in the primary industry.

== Transportation ==
The transportation is very convenient. No.320 National Road, No.311 Expressway (alias name is Hukun Expressway, or Liwen Expressway), Zhejiang-Jiangxi Railway, Hengnan Railway make the county 2 hours to Nanchang city, 3 to Hangzhou city, 4 to Shanghai city.

== Economy ==
Currently the local government concentrates on developing economy, mainly by building industry garden and offering good policies. Xin'an Industry Garden lies in the western part which is gradually expanding west to the boundary of its nearby county -Yiyang County.

== Sights and Resort ==
=== Sights ===
Cen Mountain lies in the north of Cenyang Town, which is the place of administration centre. In the mountain there are Cen Mountain Cave Temple and Tiantai Temple, both of which are Buddhist temples. There is a beautiful legend about Cen Mountain Cave. The daughter of the highest administrator of the county got blind caused by illness, and the administrator sought for all kinds of treatments to heal her but none had made sense. The local residents recommended him to use the fountain from the Cen Mountain Cave to wash her eyes. The miracle happened. The girl was able to see the world clearly again. The administrator was so very happy that he decided to build a temple to protect and commemorate the fountain, that is Cen Mountain Cave Temple.

=== Resort ===
Geyuan Town once was the capital of The Northeast Jiangxi Revolution Base where quite a lot of relics remain, such as Red Square, Hospital, Post Office, The school of Workers Peasants & Warriors, and so on.
