= Yiyang County, Jiangxi =

Yiyang 弋阳县 Iyang
- County
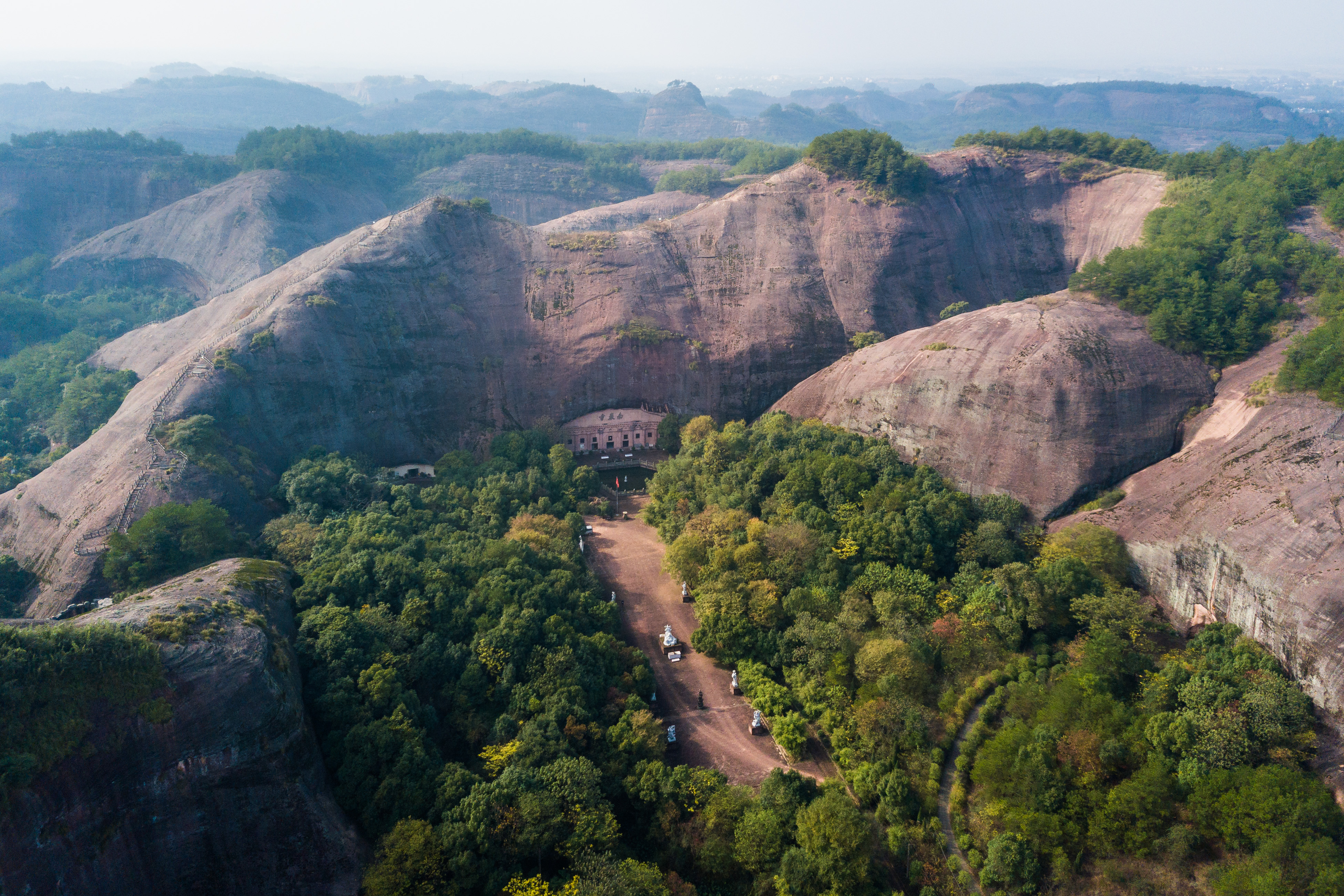
- Nanyan Grotto

- Location in Jiangxi
- Coordinates: 28°22′41″N 117°26′59″E
- Country: People's Republic of China
- Province: Jiangxi
- Prefecture-level city: Shangrao

Area
  - Total: 1,580 km^{2} (610 sq mi)

Population (2019)
  - Total: 428,000
  - Density: 271/km^{2} (702/sq mi)
- Time zone: UTC+8 (China Standard)
- Postal code: 334400

Yiyang (simplified Chinese: 弋阳县; traditional Chinese: 弋陽縣; pinyin: Yìyáng Xiàn) is a county located in the center of the prefecture-level city of Shangrao, in the northeast of Jiangxi province, People's Republic of China. In 1999 it had a population of 359,164 inhabitants.

== Administrative divisions ==
At present, Yiyang County has 1 subdistrict, 9 towns and 5 townships.

1 subdistrict

- Taoyuan (桃源街道)

9 towns

- Caoxi (曹溪镇)
- Qigong (漆工镇)
- Zhangshudun (樟树墩镇)
- Nanyan (南岩镇)
- Zhukeng (朱坑镇)
- Guifeng (圭峰镇)
- Dieshan (叠山镇)
- Gangkou (港口镇)
- Yijiang (弋江镇)

5 townships

- Zhongfan (中畈乡)
- Gexi (葛溪乡)
- Wanli (湾里乡)
- Qinghu (清湖乡)
- Xuguang (旭光乡)

== Climate ==
Climate data for Yiyang, elevation 70 m (230 ft), (1991–2020 normals, extremes 1981–2010)
Month	Jan	Feb	Mar	Apr	May	Jun	Jul	Aug	Sep	Oct	Nov	Dec	Year
Record high °C (°F)	26.4 (79.5)	30.0 (86.0)	35.4 (95.7)	35.3 (95.5)	37.0 (98.6)	38.6 (101.5)	41.4 (106.5)	41.1 (106.0)	39.4 (102.9)	38.9 (102.0)	32.5 (90.5)	26.2 (79.2)	41.4 (106.5)
Mean daily maximum °C (°F)	10.8 (51.4)	13.8 (56.8)	17.6 (63.7)	23.8 (74.8)	28.3 (82.9)	30.6 (87.1)	34.7 (94.5)	34.4 (93.9)	30.9 (87.6)	26.0 (78.8)	19.8 (67.6)	13.5 (56.3)	23.7 (74.6)
Daily mean °C (°F)	6.6 (43.9)	9.1 (48.4)	12.7 (54.9)	18.5 (65.3)	23.2 (73.8)	26.0 (78.8)	29.5 (85.1)	29.0 (84.2)	25.6 (78.1)	20.5 (68.9)	14.5 (58.1)	8.6 (47.5)	18.7 (65.6)
Mean daily minimum °C (°F)	3.7 (38.7)	5.8 (42.4)	9.3 (48.7)	14.7 (58.5)	19.5 (67.1)	22.7 (72.9)	25.5 (77.9)	25.3 (77.5)	21.9 (71.4)	16.4 (61.5)	10.7 (51.3)	5.1 (41.2)	15.1 (59.1)
Record low °C (°F)	−6.1 (21.0)	−4.1 (24.6)	−2.2 (28.0)	3.4 (38.1)	9.8 (49.6)	13.6 (56.5)	19.4 (66.9)	20.0 (68.0)	13.9 (57.0)	4.0 (39.2)	−1.5 (29.3)	−11.2 (11.8)	−11.2 (11.8)
Average precipitation mm (inches)	95.4 (3.76)	118.6 (4.67)	225.0 (8.86)	254.8 (10.03)	267.1 (10.52)	430.3 (16.94)	204.7 (8.06)	144.0 (5.67)	78.2 (3.08)	51.8 (2.04)	107.8 (4.24)	77.3 (3.04)	2,055 (80.91)
Average precipitation days (≥ 0.1 mm)	14.7	13.7	18.5	17.2	16.8	17.9	11.9	12.5	9.2	8.1	10.0	11.2	161.7
Average snowy days	2.2	1.4	0.3	0	0	0	0	0	0	0	0	0.8	4.7
Average relative humidity (%)	78	77	78	77	77	81	75	76	75	73	76	76	77
Mean monthly sunshine hours	82.3	86.7	92.9	122.4	142.9	132.5	230.9	217.5	178.8	161.6	129.5	120.1	1,698.1
Percentage possible sunshine	25	27	25	32	34	32	55	54	49	46	41	38	38
Source: China Meteorological Administration

== Transport ==
- Yiyang railway station (Jiangxi)
