= Chengdu University of Technology =

Public university in Chengdu, Sichuan, China

- 成都理工大学
- Former names: Chengdu Institute of Geology (1956–1993); Chengdu Institute of Technology (1993–2001)
- Motto: 穷究于理，成就于工
- Motto in English: Seeking Truth, Seeking Triumph
- Type: Public
- Established: 1956; 70 years ago
- Affiliations: Double First-Class
- President: Shen Huoming (沈火明)
- Faculty: 3,550
- Students: 36,000
- Location: Chengdu, Sichuan, China; 30.66583°N 104.13694°E
- Campus: 1.92 km^{2}; Urban
- Website: cdut.edu.cn

Chengdu University of Technology
- Simplified Chinese: 成都理工大学
- Traditional Chinese: 成都理工大學
Transcriptions
Standard Mandarin
- Hanyu Pinyin: Chéngdū Lǐgōng Dàxué

The Chengdu University of Technology (CDUT; 成都理工大学) is a national public research university located in Chengdu, Sichuan, China. It is a technology-focused institution co-funded by the Ministry of Education of China, the Ministry of Natural Resources of China, and the Sichuan Provincial People's Government. The university is part of the Double First-Class Construction Initiative. CDUT was established in 1956 on the basis of geology-related faculties from Chongqing University, Nanjing University, Northwest University, Beijing Institute of Geology (now China University of Geosciences), Northeast College of Geology (now Jilin University), and Jiao Tong University.

The university covers an area of 1.92 square kilometers. There are 23 colleges, 1 Institute of Sedimentary Geology, and 1 Institute of Geological Survey. The university was recognized as one of China's National Top 50 Universities for Graduate Employment and National Top 50 Universities for Innovation and Entrepreneurship. CDUT ranked within the 601-700 band globally in the 2025 Academic Ranking of World Universities (ARWU).

== History ==
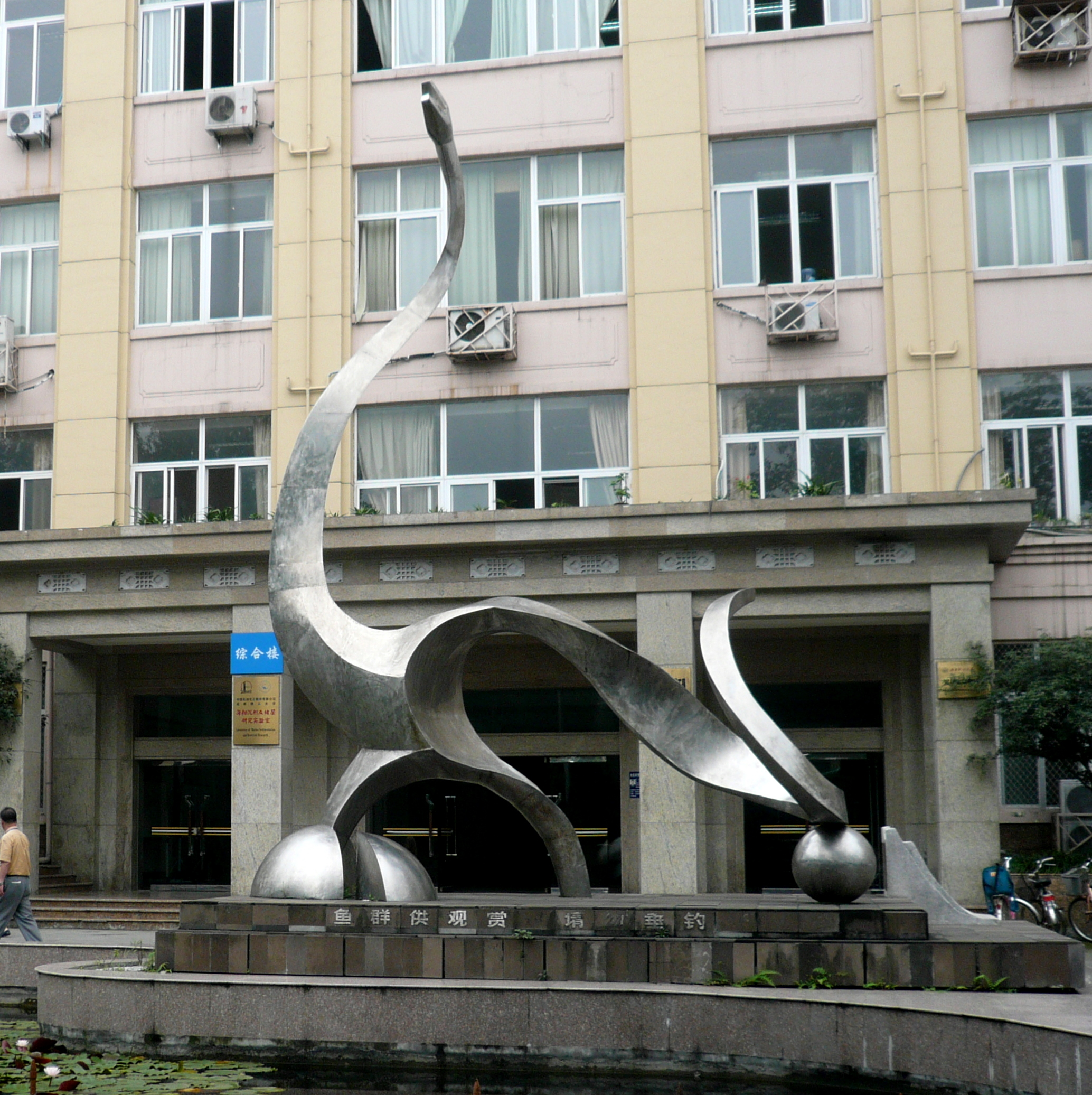
A sculpture at Chengdu University of Technology

Chengdu Institute of Geology, the predecessor of Chengdu University of Technology, was founded in 1956, based on the combination of geology-related faculties of Chongqing University, Nanjing University, Northwest University, former Beijing Institute of Geology (China University of Geosciences), former Northeast College of Geology (Jilin University), former Jiaotong University, etc., with the approval of the State Council of the People's Republic of China.

In 1993, Chengdu Institute of Geology renamed to Chengdu Institute of Technology. Chengdu Institute of Technology (Chengdu Institute of Geology) was a key university under the administration of the Ministry of Land and Resources of China (now the Ministry of Natural Resources of China).

In 2001, Chengdu Institute of Technology renamed to Chengdu University of Technology (CDUT). It is a state key university jointly-administered by the Ministry of Education of China, the Ministry of Natural Resources of China, and the Provincial Government of Sichuan. CDUT is included in the Chinese national Double First-Class Initiative and approved as a Double First Class University.

== Campus and Location ==
CDUT is located in Central Chengdu, at the heart of Chenghua District. The main campus occupies an area of approximately 1.92 km^{2}. The campus is served by the Chengdu University of Technology Station on the Line 7 and Line 8 of Chengdu Metro.

== International Cooperation and Exchange ==
In the 2010s, CDUT has invited Nobel Prize laureates and a large number of experts and scholars to give lectures. The university recruits foreign experts to set up courses for undergraduates and postgraduate students on a regular basis and bring them into the talent training system.

CDUT is included in the National Scholarship Council's innovation program and other national projects. The university has established exchanges and cooperation with more than 180 universities and scientific research institutions in Australia, Britain, Canada, Italy, the Netherlands, New Zealand, Russia, the United States, and other countries.

CDUT began to carry out in-depth cooperation with several British universities in 2005, and it is one of the earliest universities in China to set up Sino-foreign dual-degree education programs. In 2013, Chengdu University of Technology and the University of Edinburgh signed a memorandum of cooperation in education. The two universities carry out the '2+2' dual-degree education program in several undergraduate majors, including Geology, Geology and Physical Geography, Geophysics, Geophysics and Meteorology, Geophysics and Geology, Environmental Geoscience, etc. Students study in Chengdu University of Technology for the first two years of undergraduate courses, and then go to the University of Edinburgh for further studies. After completing the rest two years of undergraduate courses, the students can obtain graduation certificate and degree from Chengdu University of Technology and degree from the University of Edinburgh.

== National Key Disciplines ==
CDUT is one of a limited number of universities with both first-level and second-level national key disciplines in China. In 1988, when the first batch of National Key Disciplines were appraised and reviewed, CDUT's two disciplines were rated as first National Key Disciplines. After the merges and restructures of disciplines made by the Chinese Ministry of Education in the following years, the university has 1 first-level National Key Discipline (Geological Resources and Geological Engineering) and 4 second-level National Key Disciplines by 2008.

== University structure ==
=== Students & Teaching Staff ===
Approximately 36,000 students are enrolled in the year 2022. By July 2026, the university has 3,550 teaching and administrative staff, including 4 research teams of fellows of Chinese Academy of Science, 731 professors and 869 associate professors.

CDUT has international cooperative relationships and exchanges with more than 60 universities and institutions outside China. More than 2,800 scholars and experts from over 40 countries have visited CDUT to conduct research or to lecture by 2019. Students from the United States, Australia, Germany, Austria, Korea, Japan, Russia and other countries have studied at CDUT in different fields. Over 300 international cooperative research projects have been completed. In recent years, the university has successfully held several international academic conferences.

=== Museum ===
The CDUT museum, with more than 100,000 specimens, is the largest natural museums in West China. Many world and national class treasures are on display. Among these treasures, the 22 meter long Mamenchisaurus hochuanensis, the world's longest-necked Jurassic dinosaur's fossil, is the highlight of the museum. Another notable treasure is the Chungkingichthys tachuenses, a rare complete fish fossil. The new landmark CDUT Museum, connected with the Shilidian Station of Chengdu Metro Line 8, opened in September 2022.

=== Library & Archive ===
The CDUT library holds 2,756,000 paper volumes, 2,597,000 electronic books, and over 48,000 electronic-journals. Additionally, the library has subscribed to 90 well-known databases including SCI, Elsevier, CNKI, etc. CDUT's East Library has opened since 2016, providing additional 6000 seats.

== Scientific Research ==
By 2025, CDUT has received a total of 1,222 national, provincial and ministerial science and technology awards, including 1 Grand Prize of the National Science and Technology Progress Award, 4 First Prizes of the National Science and Technology Progress Award, 1 China International Science and Technology Cooperation Award, 1 Second Prize of the National Natural Science Award, 9 Second Prizes of the National Science and Technology Progress Award, 1 China Patent Award, 9 National Technological Invention Awards and Third Prizes of the National Science and Technology Progress Award. As of 2019 more than 1920 patents have been granted to CDUT.

The university participates in the key national projects including west-to-east power transmission, west–east gas transmission, south-to-north water diversion, Sichuan-Tibet railway, oil and gas geological exploration, energy development, large-scale hydropower station, regional and urban environment protection, as well as other national large-scale transportation infrastructure projects.

=== State Key Laboratories ===
==== State Key Laboratory of Oil and Gas Reservoir Geology and Exploitation ====
The State Key Laboratory of Oil and Gas Reservoir Geology and Exploitation of CDUT relies on 'Petroleum Geology and Exploration', the national key discipline, and 'Geology', one of the first 'World First Class disciplines' identified by the Ministry of Education. Through more than 60 years of accumulation, three stable research directions have been formed: 1) petroliferous basin dynamics and oil and gas accumulation theory; 2) oil and gas reservoir geology theory and evaluation technology; 3) geophysical prediction methods and techniques for complex oil and gas reservoirs. In 2021, combined with the needs of national energy strategy and the frontier development, new directions have been developed, including geological-engineering integration of oil and gas reservoirs and equipment, geothermal resources evaluation and development, etc.

==== State Key Laboratory of Geohazard Prevention and Geoenvironment Protection ====
For opening up and cooperations, there is an open fund set up by the laboratory, subsidizing 15 to 20 open projects annually, in order to attract more talents from home and abroad to work in the SKLGP. Besides, international communication and cooperation is always priority. SKLGP has established long-term and stable academic relationships with the universities and research institutions from US, UK, Netherlands, Italy, France, Japan, South Africa, Hong Kong, Taiwan, etc. Additionally, the SKLGP has organized many international academic conferences.

== Notable alumni ==
- Huang Runqiu (黄润秋) – Minister of Ecology and Environment of P.R.China, Vice Chairman of Jiusan Society
- Hu Changsheng (胡昌升) – Secretary of the CPC Committee of Gansu Province, Chairman of People's Congress of Gansu Province
- Xu Dachun (许大纯) – Deputy Minister of Natural Resources of China
- Wang Shijie (王世杰) – Vice Governor of Guizhou Province
- Hu Guangjie (胡广杰) – Head of United Front Work Department of Jiangsu Province, Former Vice Governor of Jiangsu Province
- Liu Baojun (刘宝珺) – Fellow of Chinese Academy of Sciences
- Hu Ruizhong (胡瑞忠) – Fellow of Chinese Academy of Sciences, Director of Institute of Geochemistry
- Zhou Xinhuai (周心怀) – CEO of China National Offshore Oil Corporation (CNOOC)
- Zhou Yuan (周源) – Founder & CEO of Zhihu Inc. (NYSE: ZH, SEHK: 2390)
- Tang Yan (唐岩) – Founder & President of Hello Group Inc. (Nasdaq: MOMO)
- Feng Yong (冯勇) – Chairman of the Supervisory Committee of Dongfang Electrics Corporation Ltd. (1072.HK, 600875.CH)
- Daqing Wan (万大庆) – Mathematician, Morningside Silver Medal of Mathematics winner, professional of University of California, Irvine
