= Liu Kuanren =

Chinese politician

- 刘宽忍

Vice Chairman of the Central Committee of the China Association for Promoting Democracy
- In office December 2022 – May 2025
- Chairman: Han Yong; Xu Xinrong

Vice Chairman of the Shaanxi Provincial Committee of the Chinese People's Political Consultative Conference.
- In office January 2018 – May 2025
- Chairman: Cai Dafeng

Personal details
- Born: October 1963 (age 62–63) Pucheng County, Shaanxi, China
- Party: China Democratic National Construction Association
- Education: Xi'an Conservatory of Music

Chinese name
- Simplified Chinese: 刘宽忍
- Traditional Chinese: 劉寬忍
Transcriptions
Standard Mandarin
- Hanyu Pinyin: Liú Kuānrěn

Liu Kuanren (Chinese: 刘宽忍; born October 1963) is a former Chinese politician who spent his entire career in his home-province Shaanxi. He was investigated by China's top anti-graft agency in May 2025. Previously he served as vice chairman of the Shaanxi Provincial Committee of the Chinese People's Political Consultative Conference. He was a delegate to the 11th and 12th National People's Congress.

== Early life and education ==
Liu was born in Pucheng County, Shaanxi, in October 1963. In 1983, he enrolled at Xi'an Conservatory of Music, where he majored in ethnic wind music.

== Career ==
After university in 1987, Liu was assigned to Shaanxi Provincial Department of Radio and Television. In September 1989 he did his postgraduate work at Xi'an Conservatory of Music, and taught there after graduation.

Liu was appointed deputy director of Shaanxi Provincial Culture Department in July 2000, concurrently serving as deputy director of Shaanxi Provincial Culture and Education Commission, and vice chairman of the Shaanxi Provincial Committee of the Democratic Progressive Party. He was a member of the Standing Committee of Shaanxi Provincial Committee of the Chinese People's Political Consultative Conference. He rose to become chairman of the Shaanxi Provincial Committee of the China Association for Promoting Democracy in November 2012 and director of Shaanxi Provincial Culture Department in February 2013. In December 2012, he was admitted to standing committee member of the Central Committee of the China Association for Promoting Democracy. He was promoted to vice chairman of the Shaanxi Provincial Committee of the Chinese People's Political Consultative Conference in January 2018, in addition to serving as vice chairman of the Central Committee of the China Association for Promoting Democracy since December 2022.

== Downfall ==
On 25 May 2025, Liu was suspected of "serious violations of official duties" by the National Supervisory Commission, the highest anti-corruption agency of China. He is the first senior official from a "democratic party" to fall from grace in 2025 and the third vice provincial-level official to be investigated in Shaanxi since the 20th National Congress of the Chinese Communist Party. On 10 November, he was expelled from the public office.

On 31 August 2026, Liu was sentenced to 15 years and fined 3.5 million yuan at the Urumqi Intermediate People's Court, for taking bribes in 41.46 million yuan and embezzlement and fraud of public funds in 7.39 million yuan.

Government offices
Preceded by Yu Huaqing	Director of Shaanxi Provincial Culture Department; 2013–2018	Succeeded by Ren Zongzhe
