= Sun Jinlong =

Chinese politician

- 孙金龙

Party Branch Secretary of the Ministry of Ecology and Environment
- Incumbent
- Assumed office April 14, 2020
- Minister: Huang Runqiu
- Preceded by: Li Ganjie

Communist Party Secretary of the Xinjiang Production and Construction Corps
- In office February 2016 – April 14, 2020
- Preceded by: Han Yong
- Succeeded by: Wang Junzheng

Deputy Communist Party Secretary of Hunan
- In office April 2013 – February 2016
- Preceded by: Mei Kebao
- Succeeded by: Ulan

Personal details
- Born: January 1962 (age 64) Zhongxiang County, Hubei, China
- Party: Chinese Communist Party
- Education: Wuhan College of Geology; Nankai University; Renmin University

Sun Jinlong (Chinese: 孙金龙; born January 1962) is a Chinese politician, serving since 2016 as the Party Branch Secretary of the Xinjiang Production and Construction Corps. Sun came to prominence in 2001, serving on the Secretariat of the Communist Youth League, then held office as party chief of Hefei, and the Deputy Communist Party Secretary of Anhui and secretary of the provincial Political and Legal Affairs Commission, and the Deputy Communist Party Secretary of Hunan province. In July 2020, the United States announced Global Magnitsky Act sanctions against Sun Jinlong for human rights abuses against Uyghurs and other ethnic minorities in Xinjiang.

== Early life and education ==
Sun was born in 1962 in Zhongxiang, Hubei province. He attended the Wuhan College of Geology (later folded into the China University of Geosciences), where he studied mining exploration. He then pursued graduate studies in the subject. Later he earned a master's and doctorate degrees in economics from Nankai University and Renmin University.

== Career ==
In 1986, he joined a squad of engineers in Liaoning. He joined the Chinese Communist Party (CCP) in April 1986, and began taking on administrative and leadership roles on the team. In 1990, he was named a "National Model Worker" and a "Provincial Model Worker".

In July 1991, he was named vice president of China Geological Engineering Company (中国地质工程公司), at 29 years of age. He was stationed in Pakistan for a period of time. Two years later he was promoted to president and party chief. In January 1995, Sun was recruited to the Communist Youth League and subsequently earned his degrees from Nankai University and Renmin University. In December 2001 he was named a Secretary of the Secretariat of the Communist Youth League.

In April 2003, he was transferred to Anhui to join the provincial party leadership council and head of the provincial Political and Legal Affairs Commission.

In 2005, Sun became the party chief of Hefei, where he initiated a successful strategy of industry-based city building. Sun prioritized the automobile, electric appliance, and equipment manufacturing sectors of the city's economy. The city government established a department for attracting investment and sent teams around the country to recruit businesses to Hefei. Sun also launched a construction program of neighborhood redevelopment, road system improvement, rail system, and a new international airport. Hefei's GDP grew at the highest rate of any Chinese provincial capital during Sun's tenure.

In Hefei, Sun was known for centralizing control and taking on ambitious infrastructure projects which resulted in significant decreases in congestion in the city, and also for fueling the city's economic growth. In July 2011, he was named Deputy Communist Party Secretary of Anhui province; in April 2013, he was transferred to Hunan province to serve as deputy party chief there. Sun was transferred to Xinjiang in 2016, taking office as the Communist Party Secretary of the Xinjiang Production and Construction Corps (minister-level).

Sun was an alternate of the 17th and 18th Central Committees of the Chinese Communist Party.

In April 2020 Sun was made the Party Branch Secretary of the Ministry of Ecology and Environment.

On 31 July 2020, the United States government imposed Global Magnitsky Human Rights Accountability Act sanctions and visa restrictions against Sun, together with his deputy Peng Jiarui, citing its view that they are engaged in human rights abuse against the ethnic minorities in Xinjiang.

Business positions
Preceded by ?	General Manager of China Geological Engineering Company; 1993–1995	Succeeded by Ye Dongsong
Civic offices
Preceded by Bayanqolu	President of All-China Youth Federation; 2001–2003	Succeeded by Zhao Yong
Party political offices
Preceded by Ren Haishen	Secretary of the Anhui Provincial Political and Legal Affairs Commission; 2003–2005	Succeeded by Xu Liquan
Preceded by Che Jun	Communist Party Secretary of Hefei; 2005–2011	Succeeded by Wu Cunrong
Preceded by Wang Mingfang	Deputy Communist Party Secretary of Anhui; 2011–2013	Succeeded by Li Jinbin
Preceded by Mei Kebao	Deputy Communist Party Secretary of Hunan; 2013–2016	Succeeded by Ulan
Preceded by Han Yong	Communist Party Secretary of Xinjiang Production and Construction Corps; 2016–2020	Succeeded by Wang Junzheng
Preceded by Li Ganjie	Party Branch Secretary of the Ministry of Ecology and Environment; 2020–present	Incumbent
