= Climate policy of China =

The climate policy of the People's Republic of China has a massive impact on global climate change, as China is the largest emitter of greenhouse gases in the world. Chinese plans to abide by carbon emission reduction goals involves peaking greenhouse gas emissions before 2030, and achieving carbon neutrality before 2060. Due to the buildup of solar power and the burning of coal, Chinese energy policy is closely related to its climate policy. There is also policy to adapt to climate change. Ding Xuexiang represented China at the 2023 United Nations Climate Change Conference in 2023, and may be influential in setting climate policy.

Chinese domestic policy is largely decided at a local or provincial level, with some guidance being provided by the national government. As such, policies meant to regulate businesses are usually enforced by city or provincial governments. Business has a clear relation to China's policy as well, as the country's focus on economic growth has shaped its energy needs and population demographics towards urban consumption, and has opened the country up to international markets since the 1970s. Since then, China has had to find balance between economic growth and counteracting climate change, which some claim that they lean towards the former.

There is a debate surrounding China's economic responsibilities in terms of climate change mitigation and efforts to mitigate climate change within China. In 2006, China surpassed the United States as the country with the highest total carbon dioxide (CO_{2}) emissions rate. As climate change is a crisis that affects the world at large, China has made international collaborations through the Paris Agreement and the Kyoto Protocol. Additionally, China's status as a world superpower has created unique relationships with other world superpowers, such as the United States. This, naturally, extends to their roles in action against the climate crisis, and thus developments in American climate policies stand to shape China's as well.

== Actors and institutions ==
Since 2000, rising CO_{2} emissions in China and the rest of world have eclipsed the output of the United States and Europe.

Per person, the United States generates carbon dioxide at a far faster rate than other primary regions.

In 2018, China established the Ministry of Ecology and Environment (MEE). A number of environmental policy functions were merged from other ministries into the MEE, including MEP functions, climate policy previously under the NDRC, and a number of environmental policy functions previously under the Ministry of Water Resources and the State Oceanic Administration. Pollutant and carbon emissions trading programs were also placed within the MEE's jurisdiction. In 2021, Ministry of Ecology and Environment published a White Paper on "Responding to Climate Change: China's Policies and Actions".

Beginning with a joint statement on the Kyoto Protocol in Bali in December 2007, Chinese non-governmental organizations (NGOs), in cooperation with international NGOs, assumed a more prominent role in efforts to mitigate climate change within China. NGO activity in China is restricted by government controls.

The Institute of Public and Environmental Affairs is attempting to persuade large GHG emitters, such as steelmakers in Hubei, to publish their emission figures.

== Greenhouse gas emissions ==
China has the most total annual emissions (area of rectangle) of any nation, and has higher than average per capita emissions.

Cumulatively over time, China is the second-largest contributor nation to global economic damage from emissions, following the U.S.

The total greenhouse gas emissions of the People's Republic of China are the world's highest, accounting for 35% of the world's total, in 2023, according to the International Energy Agency. The country's emissions may have peaked in 2024 or 2025.

When measuring production-based emissions, China emitted over 12.6 gigatonnes (Gt) CO_{2}eq of greenhouse gases in 2023, 35% of the world's total. When measuring in consumption-based terms, which adds emissions associated with imported goods and extracts those associated with exported goods, China accounted for 13 gigatonnes (Gt) or 25% of global emissions in 2019.

Greenhouse gas emissions stem mainly from coal burning, including coal power, coal mining, and blast furnaces producing iron and steel. 79% of CO2 emissions are from the burning of coal. According to the Carbon Majors Database, Chinese state coal production alone accounts for 14% of historical global emissions. In 2024, China's total historical greenhouse gas emissions surpassed those of the European Union (EU), but trailed those of the United States.

As of 2019, the country's greenhouse gas emissions exceeded the combined emissions of the developed world. China's per capita emissions correspond to over 10.1 tonnes CO_{2eq} emitted per person each year, over the world average and the EU average but lower than the second largest emitter of greenhouse gases, the United States, with its 17.6 tonnes per person, according to a 2021 analysis by the Rhodium Group. Analysis by Our World in Data also puts China's per capita emissions at over the world and EU averages but less than averages in Australia, Canada, and the U.S. Accounting for historic emissions, all OECD countries together produced four times more CO2 in cumulative emissions than China, due to developed countries' earlier start in industrialization. Overall, China is a net exporter of greenhouse emissions.

China's first nationally determined contribution target was laid out at the Paris Agreement in 2016. It was revised in 2021 and 2025. China has committed to peak emissions by 2030 and net zero by 2060. According to various analyses, China is estimated to overachieve its renewable energy capacity and emission reduction goals early, though long-term plans are still required to combat global climate change and meeting the Nationally Determined Contribution (NDC) targets.

Its commitment to reducing its greenhouse gas emissions has been a major force in decreasing the global cost of wind and solar power, in turn helping the use of renewable energy to rise globally.

== Policy in relation to economic growth ==
=== Keeping emissions growth at less than GDP growth ===
Considering that energy consumption in most developed countries has usually grown faster than GDP during the early stages of industrialization, it is to China's credit that while its GDP has grown by 9.5% per year over the last 27 years, its CO_{2} emissions have increased by only about 5.4% per year, meaning that its carbon intensity (its carbon emissions per unit of GDP) has decreased during that time.

Between 2000 and 2020, China's CO_{2} emissions increased from approximately 3,385 million tonnes (Mt) to around 10,065 Mt, reflecting an average annual growth rate of about 5.4%. This means that while the economy expanded rapidly, the corresponding rise in CO_{2} emissions was comparatively moderate, resulting in a decrease in carbon intensity. Despite this progress, China's carbon intensity remains relatively high compared to other nations. In 2024, China reduced its carbon intensity by 3.4% due to a significant increase in renewable energy capacity; however, this fell short of the annual target of a 3.9% reduction. The country aims to cut carbon intensity by 18% between 2021 and 2025, striving to peak CO_{2} emissions before 2030. However, China has only achieved an 8% reduction from 2020 to 2024, making the 2025 goal challenging to attain.

China has implemented various policies to further reduce carbon intensity and promote sustainable development. These include setting targets to peak CO_{2} emissions before 2030 and achieve carbon neutrality before 2060. The country has also invested heavily in renewable energy sources, becoming a global leader in solar and wind energy production. Additionally, China has established a national carbon trading scheme to incentivize emissions reductions across various industries.

In summary, while China's CO_{2} emissions have grown alongside its rapid economic development, the growth rate of these emissions has been lower than that of GDP, leading to a decrease in carbon intensity. Continued efforts to implement and strengthen policies aimed at reducing emissions are crucial for China to achieve its long-term climate goals.

=== The toll on GDP ===
A federal financial auditing project—the 'Green GDP' -- has focused on the economic losses incurred by pollution. The project began in 2004 to incorporate the externalities of previously unaccounted-for environmental costs, but soon produced results that were much worse than anticipated. The program stopped in 2007. The findings, published in 2006, revealed that environmental pollution in 2004 led to economic losses amounting to 511.8 billion yuan, equivalent to 3.05% of the nation's GDP. However, these figures only partially captured the full extent of environmental costs, as they primarily accounted for pollution-related damages and omitted aspects like resource depletion and ecological degradation. Consequently, independent estimates suggested that the actual economic toll could range between 8% and 12% of GDP, highlighting the significant impact of environmental factors on China's economic growth.

Despite the project's initial insights, it faced challenges, including methodological disputes and resistance from local governments concerned about the implications for economic performance metrics. These obstacles led to the discontinuation of the Green GDP initiative in 2007. The prevailing result from such Green GDP efforts has been that efforts to reduce environmental damage have come at too high a cost to economic growth. Some see this result as indication that China's values lie more in sustaining economic growth than in reducing resource depletion and negative environmental ramifications.

== Emissions trading ==
The Chinese national carbon trading scheme is an intensity-based trading system for carbon dioxide emissions by China, which started operating in 2021. The Chinese Ministry of Finance originally proposed a carbon tax in 2010, to come into effect in 2012 or 2013. The tax was never passed; in February 2021 the government instead set up an emission trading scheme (ETS) where emitters can buy and sell emission credits.

China is the largest emitter of greenhouse gases (GHG) and many major Chinese cities had severe air pollution through the 2010s, with the situation improving in the 2020s. The scheme is run by the Ministry of Ecology and Environment, which eventually plans to limit emissions from six of China's top carbon dioxide emitting industries. In 2021, it started with its power plants, and covers 40% of China's emissions, which is 15% of world emissions. China was able to gain experience in drafting and implementation of an ETS plan from the United Nations Framework Convention on Climate Change (UNFCCC), where China was part of the Clean Development Mechanism (CDM).

China's national ETS is the largest of its kind, and helps China achieve its Nationally Determined Contribution (NDC) to the Paris Agreement. In July 2021, permits were being handed out for free rather than auctioned, and the market price per tonne of CO_{2}e was around RMB 50, roughly half of the EU ETS and the UK ETS but better compared to the US, which has no formal cap-and-trade program.

The ETS reduced carbon emissions by up to 18.2%. It reduced inequality and improve welfare. Around a third of all health benefits from air pollution reduction, were achieved by the ETS. In some circumstances it reduced GDP and innovation. The system reduced emissions from the power sector by 13% during the years 2013-2020. By 2027, it is expected to expand to all major industrial emmiters and began to establish an absolute cap.

China also has a policy of forestry carbon credits. Forestry carbon credits are based on the measurement of forest growth, which is converted into carbon emission reduction measurements by government ecological and forestry offices. Owners of forests (who are typically rural families or rural villages) receive carbon tickets (碳票; tan piao) which are tradeable securities.

=== Criticisms towards emission trading schemes ===
Emission trading schemes have drawn concern regarding the effectiveness of the market strategy itself as an effective counter-measure to climate changes, as well as the parameters set within the policy that affects its potency as a solution to climate change.

Annie Leonard cites unstable economic origins and unfair, unregulated systems around emissions shares that invite corruption as reasons to be critical of ETSs. More specific to China's implementation, others that are more open to the market as a solution have still found similar issues in China's decentralized approach to climate policy which has enabled hasty free allowances to large polluters and prioritizing economic growth, which have led to an over-supply of allowances. Such issues could undermine their effectiveness as solutions to climate change. In 2016, some researchers went as far as to describe the ETSs in China as "substantially far from well-functioning systems."

In addition various studies have demonstrated transparency and regulatory consistency as major weaknesses in China's ETS implementations. Scholars point out that unclear measurement, reporting, and verification (MRV) protocols across different provinces have resulted in inconsistencies and unreliable data reporting, further exacerbating problems of oversupply and undermining the scheme's intended environmental impacts. Furthermore, regional governments' competing economic incentives often lead to lenient emissions caps, creating a biased policy landscape that weakens overall emissions reduction goals. For instance, In their analysis, Zhang et al. (2019) identified considerable variability in allowance allocation strategies across provinces, noting how lack of harmonization has caused disparities in market effectiveness and fairness. They emphasized that without a standardized national framework addressing these discrepancies, the long-term viability of China's ETS remains questionable. The authors argued for enhanced governance, stronger institutional oversight, and clearer accountability measures to mitigate these systemic flaws. Similarly, Lo and Cong (2017) critiqued the decentralized enforcement mechanisms inherent in China's policy framework, indicating that regional autonomy in ETS management contributes significantly to regulatory loopholes and enforcement challenges. They recommend increased centralization or at least stronger national coordination mechanisms to ensure consistency and adherence to environmental objectives, thus boosting market credibility and functional efficiency.

== The large scale of current mitigation ==
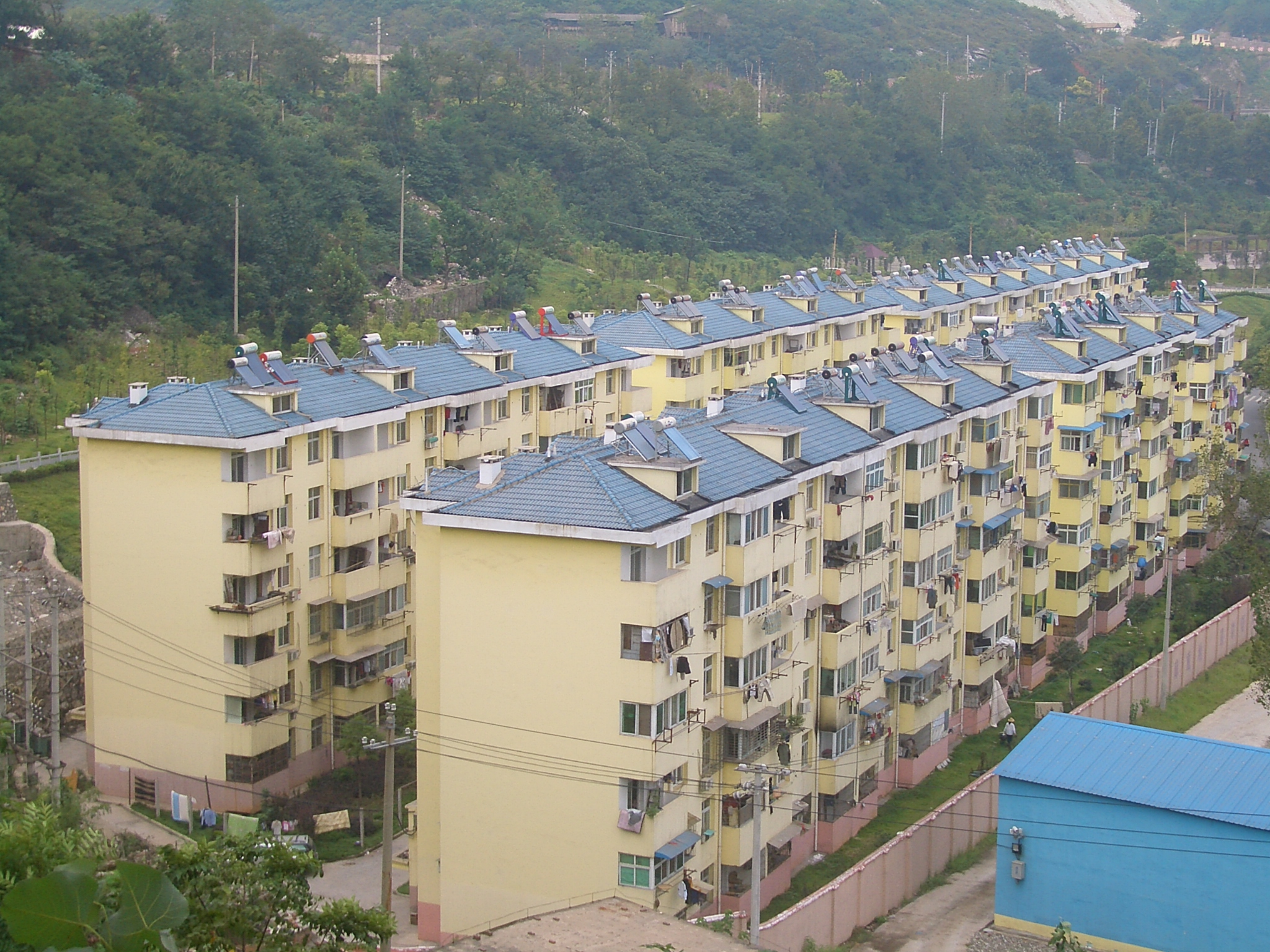
New apartment buildings in Hubei are commonly equipped with solar water heaters

As of 2008, China's per capita emissions of CO_{2} were still one-quarter of that of the US. Though China continues to build emissions-intensive coal-fired power plants, its "rate of development of renewable energy is even faster".

There is great interest in solar power in China. The world's market share of China's photovoltaic units manufacturers grew from approximately 1% in 2003 to 18% in 2007, with one of the largest Chinese manufacturers of these devices being the Chinese solar company Suntech. Although the overwhelming majority of the photovoltaic units are exported, plans are under to increase the installed capacity to at least 1,800 MW by 2020. Some officials expect the plans to be significantly over-fulfilled, with the installed capacity reaching possibly as much as 10,000 megawatts by 2020.

Due to the growing demand for photovoltaic electricity, more companies (Aleo Solar, Global Solar, Anwell, CMC Magnetics, etc.) have entered into the photovoltaic market, which is expected to lower the cost of PV cells.

Solar water heating is already used extensively throughout the country. China proposed a solar water heating system with seasonal thermal storage to solve the heating problems in rural regions of Northern China.

China also has embarked upon a 9 million acre (36,000 km^{2}) reforestation project—the Green Wall of China—that may become the largest ecological project in history; it is projected to be finished by 2050 at a cost of up to US$8 billion.

== Emissions contributed by multinationals in China ==
Chinese officials claim that they are doing a great deal that is often not visible, especially for a country as large, populous, and (rurally) undeveloped as it is. But working against that, and equally non-visible, is the role of multinational ventures in China in contributing to its emissions. It has been estimated that as of 2004, almost a quarter (23%) of China's CO_{2} emissions were coming from Chinese-made products destined for the West, providing an interesting perspective on China's large trade surplus. Another study showed that around 1/3 of emissions from China in 2005 were due to exports. Over half of those emissions driven by demand from the West are from transnationals taking advantage of China's developmental policies favouring heavy manufacturing over regions with more developed environmental laws and enforcement. This includes many of the Walmart-suppliers and other foreign-owned factories that stock department store shelves, particularly in the US.

China has buttressed its call for joint international responsibility for at least part of China's emissions, by making public, in Jan 2008, Multinationals committed 130 violations of Chinese environmental law.

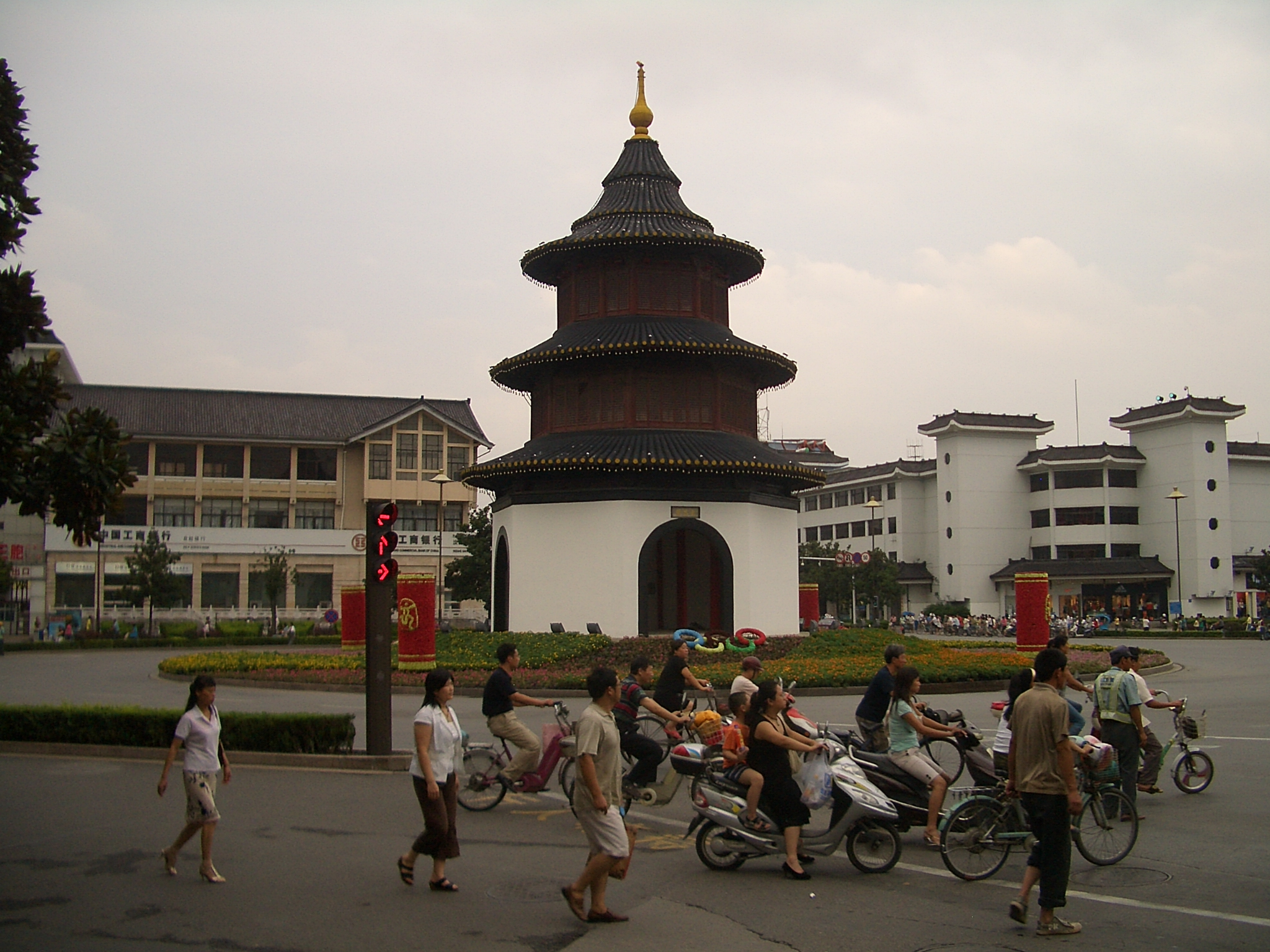
Unlike their counterparts in many other countries, many Chinese commuters opt for electric bicycles and electric scooters, rather than vehicles with internal combustion engines

== International collaboration ==
China has been in talks with several countries in regards to its continued greenhouse gas output, along with its efforts to abide by greenhouse gas emission targets. The relationship between U.S. Climate envoy John Kerry and Chinese climate envoy Xie Zhenhua allowed for improved collaboration between the two nations. In 2023 the U.S. and China made an agreement to work toward several achievements meant to lessen the impact of the climate crisis, including improved renewable energy output, protecting forests, and reducing greenhouse gas emissions.

China has been a frequent participant in climate agreements meant to promote reduction in greenhouse gas emissions, including the Kyoto Protocol and the Paris Agreement, although it is not obligated to follow through with achieving the goals put forth by a given agreement. However, following the Copenhagen Accord in 2009, China has been subject to international criticism from climate activists due to attempts to leverage these deals toward more favorable conditions for their coal industry, which plays a large role in China's rising economic influence.

Due to the influence of climate change denialism in U.S. politics, which resulted in President Donald Trump pulling out of the Paris Agreement, there has been some speculation that China would take the United States' place as chief enforcer of climate agreement guidelines. China has committed US$3.1 billion of aid toward developing nations, in order to strengthen their efforts toward implementing carbon emission goals, signaling a desire to procure more influence among both developing nations and the climate movement.

In November 2025, China joined the COP30 Climate Coalition proposal.

=== Biden administration reaction to Chinese climate policy ===
The Biden administration views climate change as a national security priority, leading the U.S. to rejoin the Paris Agreement in January 2021 and appoint John Kerry as Special Presidential Envoy for Climate. However, the administration has expressed skepticism regarding China's commitment to climate cooperation, particularly criticizing its Belt and Road Initiative (BRI). While China is the world's largest investor in renewable energy domestically, between 2014 and 2017, about 91% of Chinese banks' energy-sector loans to BRI countries were for fossil fuel projects. In 2018 alone, coal projects accounted for 40% of these energy-sector loans. By 2016, China was involved in constructing approximately 240 coal plants in BRI partner nations, a number which has likely grown since then. Consequently, the Biden administration has characterized these investments as environmentally detrimental and economically motivated "greenwashing."

== Debates ==
=== Opposition from provincial and local officials ===
Officials in Beijing cite violations by Chinese companies—in this case, to illustrate the enormity of the task in front of them in getting compliance for environmental regulations which they see as very progressive. Regional and local officials have been tasked with pushing companies toward accepting these regulatory measures.

Although local or regional governments have been tasked with carrying out environmental regulations, enforcement is typically fairly light. For example, in 2006, Premier Wen Jiabao issued a warning to local officials to shut down some of the plants in the most energy-intensive industries, designating at least six industries for slow-down. The following year, those same industries posted a 20.6% increase in output. Also in 2006, the national government began banning logging in some locations in order to expand its efforts to protect forests, and at the same time restricted the size of cities and golf courses in order to increase land use efficiency. However, there is a history in China of local authorities failing to uphold environmental regulation set forth at the national level.

Lack of compliance is partially because local governments now have a chunk of funding for which they are not beholden to the central government, and are motivated to protect those funding sources which pollute, but pollute profitably.

As a result, China's State Environmental Protection Administration attempted to use local banks as a means of discouraging companies from carbon-intensive practices, which has resulted in some unexpected failures. Many local governments that have officially implemented the 'Green Credit' policy of loaning only to companies with green practices continue also to protect polluting firms that are profitable, and the banks in some provinces have yet to apply the policy at all.

=== Economic growth ===
China's leadership worries that China would end up suffering a slowdown in economic growth that would result in "massive unemployment and social unrest". Some economists have estimated that a 2030 deadline for carbon emission reduction could result in a 2% decrease in GDP. Additionally, stronger carbon emission caps have been expected to hurt Chinese- and foreign-owned companies in the short term, though adapting to these policies could still result in future growth.

=== Global Responsibility and Historical Emissions ===
Chinese officials argue that China has been contributing to global warming for only 30 years, while the developed countries have been doing so for 200 years. Additionally, pollution-flagrant early stages of industrialization may have contributed to what China sees as a lack of balance of power, particularly between the US and China, therefore many Chinese officials see global warming mitigation as creating an economic burden that slows its economy and further exacerbates the unequal balance of power.

Chinese officials point out that the highest per capita emissions have long been and still are in developed countries, not in China. As such, Chinese officials insist that developed nations should shoulder a comparable portion of the global cost for reversing the world's emissions, consistent with the polluter pays principle.

China's climate envoy Xie Zhenhua has emphasized China's stance that rich countries have a greater responsibility regarding climate change than China, though China has been the world's largest carbon emitter since 2006. His speech at the 2010 climate conference in South Africa conveyed this Chinese position:

We are developing countries. We need to develop and eradicate poverty while protecting the environment. We've done what we should do, but you [developed countries] haven't. What right do you have to lecture us?

== History ==
As a member of the UNFCCC, China has participated in several conferences meant to implement resolutions toward reducing greenhouse gas emissions. However, China is a Non-Annex I signatory, meaning the nation is not obligated to meet reduction goals. The provision by which China signed the Kyoto Protocol without committing to a cap was the same provision given to all developing nation signers.

China's Fourteenth Five-Year Plan was the first Five-Year Plan to lay out Chinese climate policy. The Climate Change Special Plan, which is included in the Fourteenth Five-Year Plan, emphasizes ecologically oriented urban planning, including through means like urban green rings, public transportation, and bicycle lanes and walking paths.

In October 2021, China announced the 1+N plan, which details the nation's approach toward climate policy for the years between 2021 and 2029, including intentions to substitute coal or fossil fuel power for cleaner energy sources, such as renewables or nuclear energy. The plan also includes provisions to promote low-carbon methods for energy production and industry, in order to peak the nation's carbon output before 2030. This plan places emphasis on clean energy sources and low-carbon production, meant to push the country toward achieving carbon neutrality by 2060.

== See also ==
- Attribution of recent climate change
- Belt and Road Initiative International Green Development Coalition
- Climate change in China
- Dongtan, a Chinese eco-city
- Energy policy of China
- Green growth in China
- List of countries by carbon dioxide emissions
