= Hu Ruizhong =

Chinese Geologist

- 胡瑞忠
- Born: December 1958 (age 67); Dao County, Hunan, China
- Education: Chengdu University of Technology
- Scientific career
- Fields: Economic geology
- Workplaces: Institute of Geochemistry

Hu Ruizhong (Chinese: 胡瑞忠; pinyin: Hú Ruìzhōng; born December 1958) is a Chinese geologist and member of the Chinese Academy of Sciences. He was a delegate to the 12th National People's Congress.

== Biography ==
Hu was born in Dao County, Hunan, in December 1958. He earned his bachelor's degree, master's degree and a doctor's degree all from Chengdu Institute of Geology (now Chengdu University of Technology). After graduating in 1988, he taught at the university until December. He was a visiting scholar at New Zealand Institute of Geology and Nuclear Science from June to December 1992, University of Manchester from November 1995 to June 1996, and California Institute of Technology from December 2001 to May 2002. He also studied at the University of Hong Kong three times in 2003, 2005 and 2008.

In January 1989, he joined the Institute of Geochemistry, where he worked successively as the deputy director of Deposit Opening Office, the director Deposit Opening Office, and the director of the Institute of Geochemistry.

== Honours and awards ==
- 18 November 2021 Member of the Chinese Academy of Sciences
