= Chen Jining =

Chinese academic and politician

- 陈吉宁
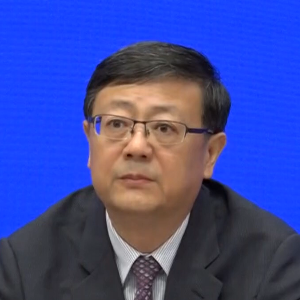

Party Secretary of Shanghai
- Incumbent
- Assumed office 28 October 2022
- Mayor: Gong Zheng
- Preceded by: Li Qiang

Mayor of Beijing
- In office 27 May 2017 – 28 October 2022
- Party Secretary: Cai Qi
- Preceded by: Cai Qi
- Succeeded by: Yin Yong

Minister of Environmental Protection
- In office 27 February 2015 – 27 June 2017
- Premier: Li Keqiang
- Preceded by: Zhou Shengxian
- Succeeded by: Li Ganjie

President of Tsinghua University
- In office 20 February 2012 – 28 January 2015
- Preceded by: Gu Binglin
- Succeeded by: Qiu Yong

Personal details
- Born: 4 February 1964 (age 62) Gaizhou, Liaoning, China
- Party: Chinese Communist Party
- Education: Tsinghua University (BE); Brunel University London; Imperial College London (PhD)
- Occupation: academic; environmental engineer; ecologist; politician
- Scientific career
- Fields: Civil engineering
- Thesis: Modelling and control of the activated sludge process: towards a systematic framework (1993)
- Doctoral advisor: M. B. Beck

Chen Jining (Chinese: 陈吉宁; pinyin: Chén Jíníng; born 4 February 1964) is a Chinese environmental scientist, academic administrator and politician who has been serving as Party Secretary of Shanghai and member of the 20th Politburo of the Chinese Communist Party since October 2022.

Chen graduated from the Imperial College London with a PhD in environmental systems analysis in 1992. Staying at the Imperial College after his graduation, he completed his postdoctoral studies in 1994 and served as an assistant researcher from 1994 to 1997. In 1998, he returned to his undergraduate alma mater Tsinghua University in Beijing to serve as vice chair of the Department of Environmental Science and Engineering. He then served as the university's vice president from 2006 to 2007, executive vice president from 2007 to 2012, and president from 2012 to 2015.

Joining the Chinese government in 2015, Chen served as Minister of Environmental Protection from 2015 to 2017, Vice Mayor of Beijing from 2017 to 2018, and Mayor of Beijing from 2018 to 2022. In October 2022, he was appointed as the Party Secretary of Shanghai and joined the CCP Politburo.

== Early life and education ==
Chen was born and raised in Gaizhou, Yingkou, Liaoning province in Northeast China. His ancestral home is in Lishu County, Siping, Jilin.

Chen started his undergraduate studies at Tsinghua University in 1981. From Tsinghua University, he received a Bachelor of Engineering with a major in civil and environmental engineering in 1986 and a Master of Science in environmental engineering in 1988. Chen traveled to the United Kingdom for graduate studies at Brunel University London in 1988. Chen transferred to Imperial College London in 1989, where he graduated with a Doctor of Philosophy in civil engineering in 1992.

After receiving his doctorate, Chen worked at Imperial College London as a postdoctoral researcher from 1992 to 1994 and as an assistant researcher from 1994 to 1998.

== Academic career ==
In March 1998, Chen left the United Kingdom to serve as deputy director of the Department of Environmental Engineering at Tsinghua University in Beijing. He was promoted and served as the department director from 1999 to 2006.

In February 2006, he was appointed as vice-president of Tsinghua University, a year later, he was promoted to become the Executive Vice-president. He concurrently served as Dean of the Graduate School of Tsinghua University from January 2010 to February 2012, Dean of the Graduate School at Shenzhen, Tsinghua University between January 2010 to July 2011.

In February 2012, Chen was appointed president of Tsinghua University, he remained in that position until January 2015, when he was appointed Minister of Environmental Protection of China. At the time of his appointment, he was the youngest member of Li Keqiang's cabinet. In 2015, he was also a member of the judging panel for the Queen Elizabeth Prize for Engineering.

== Political career ==
=== Ministry of Ecology and Environment ===
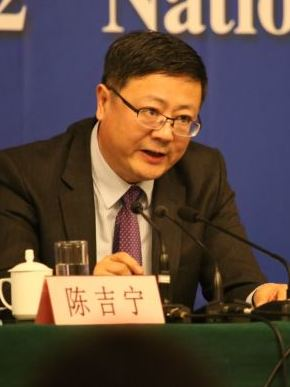
Chen in 2015

Chen succeeded Zhou Shengxian as party secretary of the Ministry of Environmental Protection on 28 January 2015. He was appointed minister later that year, becoming the youngest national minister at the time, at age 50.

During his term, Under the Dome, a film about air pollution in Northern China, was released. Chen praised the film and thanked its producer. Under the Dome was initially promoted by Chinese state media, but all mentions were removed and the film was censored in March. Chen subsequently stopped mentioning the film in all public events.

In September 2015, Chen pledged to make eight agencies affiliated with the Ministry independent by the end of next year, or revoke their qualifications otherwise. In March 2016, the Ministry of Environmental Protection announced major internal reforms, transitioning from hitting environmental targets to exercising comprehensive governance. Chen held an emergency meeting in October 2016 after Beijing was put on yellow smog alert. In January 2017, he inspected the monitoring of emissions on highways and industrial areas.

=== Beijing ===
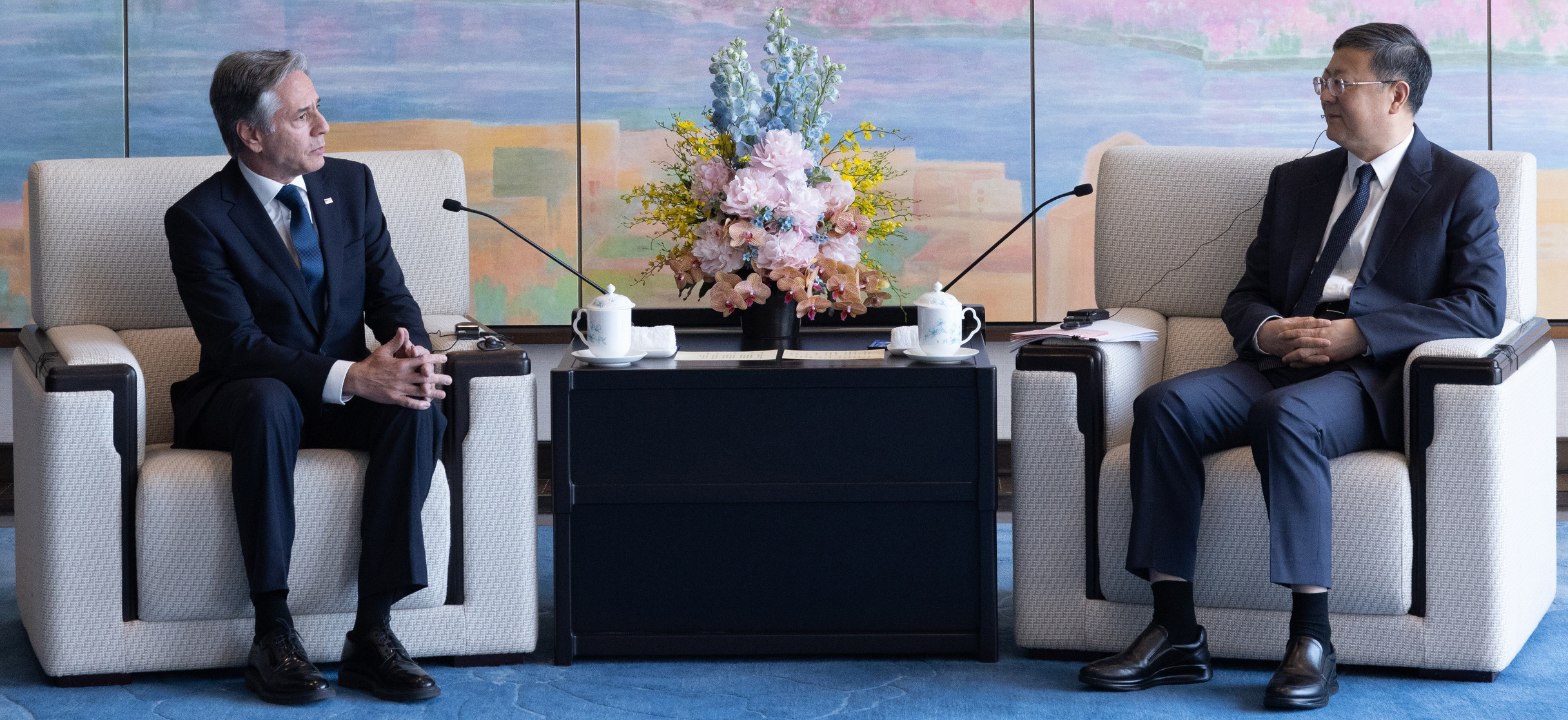
United States Secretary of State Antony Blinken met Shanghai Chinese Communist Party Secretary Chen Jining in Shanghai on April 25, 2024.

In May 2017, Chen was appointed acting Mayor of Beijing, becoming the 17th person to hold the office since the founding of the People's Republic of China. Chen became a deputy to the 12th National People's Congress in March 2018.

In February 2020, amidst the growing COVID-19 pandemic, Chen visited several companies in Zhongguancun to check on their operations. He was awarded the Silver Olympic Order after the 2022 Winter Olympics.

=== Shanghai ===
Chen became a member of the Politburo after the 20th Party Congress and was appointed Party Secretary of Shanghai, succeeding Li Qiang who became a standing member. As party secretary, Chen has visited the CCP's historical sites and repeatedly mentioned Xi Jinping's political theories.

In April 2023, Chen met with former Taiwanese President Ma Ying-jeou. In May 2023, after instructions by Xi, Chen convened a meeting to call for an "upgraded version" of the waste disposal scheme first implemented in 2019. In the same month, he met with JPMorgan Chase chief executive Jamie Dimon. In June 2023, Chen met with Tesla, Inc. CEO Elon Musk, where he encouraged Musk to increase investment in China. In July 2023, Chen convened a meeting of the Shanghai Municipal Committee to relay a decision made by the CCP leadership on Beijing to put Dong Yunhu, director of the Shanghai Municipal People's Congress Standing Committee, under investigation.

He met with US Commerce Secretary Gina Raimondo in August 2023. He met with US Senators led by Senate Majority Leader Chuck Schumer in October 2023, where he called for "healthy and stable" China–US relations. In 2024, Chen was in the forefront of efforts to reassure foreign investors amid concerns about the economy. In November 2024, he met with Hong Kong Chief Executive John Lee Ka-chiu, where both sides pledged to increase ties. He also met with UK Prime Minister Keir Starmer and Serbian President Aleksandar Vučić in 2026.

== Notes ==
Educational offices
Preceded by Gu Binglin	President of Tsinghua University; 2012–2015	Succeeded by Qiu Yong
Government offices
Preceded by Zhou Shengxian	Minister of Environmental Protection; 2015–2017	Succeeded by Li Ganjie
Preceded by Cai Qi	Mayor of Beijing; 2017–2022	Succeeded by Yin Yong
Party political offices
Preceded by Li Qiang	Party Secretary of Shanghai; 2022–	Incumbent
Order of precedence
Preceded by Chen Wenqing as Member of the Politburo of the Chinese Communist Party	Order of precedence of China as Member of the Politburo of the Chinese Communist Party	Succeeded by Li Ganjie as Member of the Politburo of the Chinese Communist Party
