= Shaanxi Provincial Committee of the Chinese People's Political Consultative Conference =

Shaanxi Provincial Committee of the Chinese People's Political Consultative Conference 中国人民政治协商会议陕西省委员会
- 13th
- Emblem of the Chinese People's Political Consultative Conference

Type
- Type: United front organ Constitutional convention (Historical); Legislature (Historical) of Chinese People's Political Consultative Conference

History
- Founded: February 1955; 71 years ago
- Preceded by: Shaanxi Provincial People's Congress Consultative Committee

Leadership
- Chairperson: Xu Xinrong

Website
- www.sxzx.gov.cn

Chinese name
- Simplified Chinese: 中国人民政治协商会议陕西省委员会
- Traditional Chinese: 中國人民政治協商會議陝西省委員會
Transcriptions
Standard Mandarin
- Hanyu Pinyin: Zhōngguó Rénmín Zhèngzhì Xiéshāng Huìyì Shǎanxīshěng Wěiyuánhuì

Abbreviation
- Simplified Chinese: 陕西省政协
- Traditional Chinese: 陕西省政協
- Literal meaning: CPPCC ShaanxiProvincial Committee
Transcriptions
Standard Mandarin
- Hanyu Pinyin: Shǎanxīshěng Zhèngxié

The Shaanxi Provincial Committee of the Chinese People's Political Consultative Conference (Chinese: 中国人民政治协商会议陕西省委员会) is the advisory body and a local organization of the Chinese People's Political Consultative Conference in Shaanxi, China. It is supervised and directed by the Shaanxi Provincial Committee of the Chinese Communist Party.

== History ==
The Shaanxi Provincial Committee of the Chinese People's Political Consultative Conference traces its origins to the Shaanxi Provincial People's Congress Consultative Committee (陕西省各界人民代表会议协商委员会), founded in 1949.

=== Anti-corruption campaign ===
On 19 October 2023, chairperson Han Yong was suspected of "serious violations of laws and regulations" by the Central Commission for Discipline Inspection (CCDI), the party's internal disciplinary body, and the National Supervisory Commission, the highest anti-corruption agency of China.

== Term ==
=== 1st ===
- Chairperson: Zhang Desheng
- Vice Chairpersons: Liu Wenwei, Gao Guizi, Huang Zixiang, Dang Qingfan, Yang Bolun
- Secretary-General: Li Lianbi

=== 2nd ===
- Chairperson: Zhang Desheng (1960) → Fang Zhongru
- Vice Chairpersons: Huang Zixiang, Dang Qingfan, Yang Bolun, Chang Lifu, Yang Zilian, Yang Yuting, Gao Changjiu, Wang Juren, Su Zichen, Huo Zhusan, Han Wangchen, Chen Yugao, Hou Zonglian, Huo Zile, Zhang Hanwu, Tan Guofan
- Secretary-General: Lei Rong

=== 3rd ===
- Chairperson: Zhao Shouyi
- Vice Chairpersons: Huang Zixiang, Dang Qingfan, Yang Bolun, Yang Zilian, Yang Yuting, Gao Changjiu, Wang Juren, Huo Zhusan, Han Wangchen, Chen Yugao, Hou Zonglian, Huo Zile, Zhang Hanwu, Tan Guofan
- Secretary-General: Lei Rong

=== 4th ===
- Chairperson: Lü Jianren
- Vice Chairpersons: Huang Zixiang, Yang Bolun, Chang Lifu, Gao Changjiu, Chen Yugao, Hou Zonglian, Zhang Hanwu, Tan Guofan, Li Shouzhi, Wu Jinnan, Min Hongyou, Xiong Yingdong, Gong Zutong, Cui Tianfu, Yang Heting, Liu Jukui, Ren Qian, Shen Shangxian, Fu Daoshen, Ai Chunan, Wu Shengxiu, Hu Jingtong, Xue Daowu, Yang Lin, Hu Jingru, Fan Ming, Xue Lanbin, Du Ruilan, Qin Zhongfang
- Secretary-General: Bai Ruisheng

=== 5th ===
- Chairperson: Tan Weixu
- Vice Chairpersons: Li Shouzhi, Liu Jukui, Ren Qian, Shen Shangxian, Fu Daoshen, Hu Jingtong, Xue Daowu, Hu Jingru, Fan Ming, Du Ruilan, Liu Gangmin, Kang Jiansheng, Gao Lingyun, Wu Qingyun, Wei Mingzhong, Li Jinglun, Shen Jin, Sun Tianyi
- Secretary-General: Wang Zhimin

=== 6th ===
- Chairperson: Zhou Yaguang
- Vice Chairpersons: Wu Qingyun, Liu Gangmin, Wei Mingzhong, Shen Shangxian, Hu Jingtong, Hu Jingru, Li Sengui, Bai Jinxun, Shen Jin, Liu Liangzhan, Sun Tianyi, Huang Junshan, Zhang Heling
- Additional Vice Chairpersons: Dong Jichang
- Secretary-General: Wang Zhimin

=== 7th ===
- Chairperson: Zhou Yaguang
- Vice Chairpersons: Dong Jichang, Liang Qi, Ji Hongshang, Sun Tianyi, Huang Junshan, Zhang Heling, Wang Shichen, Su Ming, Jiang Xinzhen, Ti Kaoshan, Zhu Zhenyi
- Additional Vice Chairpersons: An Qiyuan
- Secretary-General: Wang Zhimin (February 1995) → Hui Shiwu

=== 8th ===
- Chairperson: An Qiyuan
- Vice Chairpersons: Cai Zhulin, Ji Hongshang, Sun Tianyi, Su Ming, Jiang Xinzhen, Ti Kaoshan, Zhu Zhenyi, Huang Zhong, Li Yafang, Liu Jincai, Shi Xueyou (January 2001–), Ai Pishan (January 2002–), Lu Dong (July 2002–)
- Secretary-General: Hui Shiwu (–January 1998) → Yao Yi

=== 9th ===
- Term: January 2003–January 2008
- Chairperson: Ai Pishan (died in April 2006, position vacant)
- Vice Chairpersons: Tian Yuan, Zhu Zhenyi, Chen Zongxing, Li Yafang, Liu Jincai, Shi Xueyou, Hu Yue, Lu Dong, Pang Jiayu (–February 2007), Liu Shimin, Zhang Shengchao, Zhang Baoqing (January 2005–), Yang Yongmao (January 2007–), Wang Shousen (January 2007–)
- Secretary-General: Yao Yi

=== 10th ===
- Term: January 2008–January 2013
- Chairperson: Ma Zhongping
- Vice Chairpersons: Zhang Wei, Zhang Shengchao, Zhou Yibo, Liu Xinwen, Wang Xiaoan, Li Xiaodong, Li Dongyu, Li Jinquan, Zhou Weijian, Liang Fengmin
- Secretary-General: Yao Zengzhan

=== 11th ===
- Term: January 2013–January 2018
- Chairperson: Ma Zhongping (–January 2016) → Han Yong (January 2016–)
- Vice Chairpersons: Liu Xinwen (–January 2017), Li Xiaodong, Li Dongyu, Zhou Weijian, Liang Fengmin (–January 2016), Qian Junchang, Zhu Zuoli (–February 27, 2014), Feng Yueju, Zheng Xiaoming (January 2014–), Sun Qingyun (January 2015–November 12, 2015), Sun Qixin (January 2015–), Zhang Shenian (January 2016–), Chen Qiang (January 2017–), Zhu Liek (January 2017–)
- Secretary-General: Yao Zengzhan (–January 2016) → Yan Chaoying (Appointed January 2016)

=== 12th ===
- Term: January 2018–January 2023
- Chairperson: Han Yong (–January 2022) → Xu Xinrong (January 2022–)
- Vice Chairpersons: Chen Qiang, Zhu Liek, Zhang Daomo (–January 2020), Li Xiaodong (–January 2022), Li Dongyu (–January 2022), Yang Guanjun, Wang Weihua, Liu Kuanren, Wang Erhu, Wei Zengjun (January 2020–), Zhang Guangzhi (January 2022–)
- Secretary-General: Yan Chaoying (–January 2022) → Xue Zhanhai (January 2022–)

=== 13th ===
- Term: January 2023 – 2028
- Chairperson: Xu Xinrong
- Vice Chairpersons: Li Xingwang, Yang Guanjun, Liu Kuanren, Zhang Xiaoguang, Sun Ke, Fan Jiulun, Li Zhongmin, Gao Ling
- Secretary-General: Wang Gang
