= Li Ganjie =

Chinese politician

- 李干杰
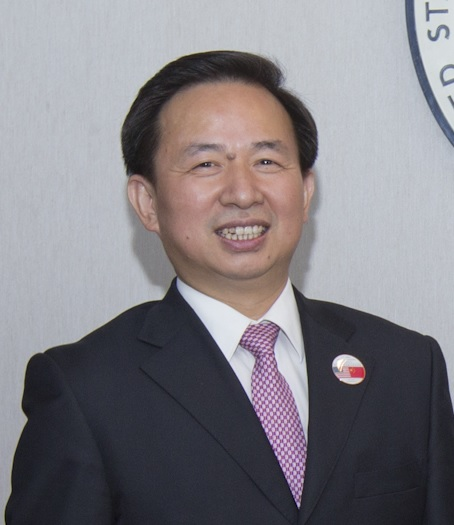
- Li in 2013

Head of the United Front Work Department of the Chinese Communist Party
- Incumbent
- Assumed office 2 April 2025
- Deputy: Chen Xiaojiang (executive)
- General Secretary: Xi Jinping
- Preceded by: Shi Taifeng

Head of the Organization Department of the Chinese Communist Party
- In office 26 April 2023 – 2 April 2025
- Deputy: Jiang Xinzhi (executive)
- General Secretary: Xi Jinping
- Preceded by: Shi Taifeng

Party Secretary of Shandong
- In office 30 September 2021 – 29 December 2022
- Deputy: Zhou Naixiang (Governor)
- Preceded by: Liu Jiayi
- Succeeded by: Lin Wu

Governor of Shandong
- In office 17 April 2020 – 30 September 2021
- Party Secretary: Liu Jiayi
- Preceded by: Gong Zheng
- Succeeded by: Zhou Naixiang

Minister of Ecology and Environment
- In office 19 March 2018 – 29 April 2020
- Premier: Li Keqiang
- Preceded by: Himself (as Minister of Environmental Protection)
- Succeeded by: Huang Runqiu

Minister of Environmental Protection
- In office 27 June 2017 – 19 March 2018
- Premier: Li Keqiang
- Preceded by: Chen Jining
- Succeeded by: Himself (as Minister of Ecology and Environment)

Personal details
- Born: November 11, 1964 (age 61) Wangcheng County, Hunan
- Party: Chinese Communist Party
- Education: Tsinghua University

Li Ganjie (Chinese: 李干杰; born 11 November 1964) is a Chinese politician serving as the head of the United Front Work Department of the Chinese Communist Party (CCP). He is a member of the 20th Politburo of the Chinese Communist Party and a secretary of the 20th Secretariat of the Chinese Communist Party.

Li has previously served as head of the National Nuclear Safety Administration, deputy party secretary of Hebei, the Minister of Ecology and Environment (previously as the Minister of Environmental Protection) from 2017 to 2020, the Party Secretary of Shandong from 2021 to 2022, and the head of the Organization Department of the Chinese Communist Party from 2023 to 2025.

== Early life ==
Li was born in Wangcheng County, Hunan province. He joined the CCP in 1984, while attending Tsinghua University, where he studied industrial physics and nuclear safety. He has a master's degree in engineering. In July 1989, after completing graduate studies, he became an engineer at the National Nuclear Safety Administration's Beijing office. Between September 1991 and January 1993, he studied in France.

== Political career ==
Between March 1993 and July 1998, he took on a series of successively senior roles at the Nuclear Safety Administration. In 1998 he was sent as a guazhi deputy party secretary of Pingjiang County, Hunan.

In January 1999, Li began working at the office of the Chinese Ambassador to France, specializing in technology affairs. In July 2000, he was transferred to the State Administration for Environmental Protection (SEPA, later established as a ministry). He then took on a series of leading positions specializing in nuclear safety, eventually rising to head of the National Nuclear Safety Administration in December 2006. In March 2008, after reforms, Li took on the concurrent post of Deputy Minister of Environmental Protection.

In October 2016, Li was transferred to become Deputy Party Secretary of Hebei province.

=== Minister of Environmental Protection ===
In June 2017, Li was named Minister of Environmental Protection. At the time of his appointment he was the youngest member of the ministerial level officials of the State Council. He visited Hebei, Shanxi, Shandong and Henan in October 2017, where he said efforts to increase air quality faced "huge difficulties". In March 2018, Li unveiled a three-year "green" plan to improve air quality and increase regulations. In a conference in October 2018, Li warned against using "simple and crude" methods to fight pollution that damaged businesses, such as blanket ban on factory operations. In January 2019, he warned some local regions lost "momentum" in fighting against pollution, especially rural areas and poorer industrial towns.

=== Shandong ===
In April 2020, Li was appointed the acting Governor of Shandong Province. He was elected as the governor in July.

=== Politburo ===
In October 2022, Li was elected to the 20th Politburo of the Chinese Communist Party. He is the youngest member of the Politburo. In April 2023, Li assumed the office of the head of the Organization Department, succeeding Chen Xi.

On 2 April 2025, South China Morning Post reported that Li had succeeded Shi Taifeng as the head of the United Front Work Department, while Shi replaced Li as the head of the Organization Department. In June 2025, Li visited the Buddhist Association of China, the Chinese Taoist Association, the Islamic Association of China, the Chinese Catholic Patriotic Association, the Bishops' Conference of the Catholic Church in China and other religious groups, and also warned against "hidden dangers in the religious field and resolutely resist foreign infiltration". In April 2026, Li visited visited several religious organisations and study institutions in the Tibetan autonomous prefectures of Gansu and Sichuan, where he called on efforts to "guide Tibetan Buddhism to adapt to socialist society in accordance with the requirements of systematically advancing the Sinicisation of religion and strengthening the rule of law in religious affairs" and urged the implementation of the Law on Promoting Ethnic Unity and Progress. In June 2026, he attended the 40th anniversary of the China Tibetology Research Center, where he called on efforts for "enhancing China’s international discourse power on Tibet-related matters" and said Tibetologists should "strengthen theoretical guidance" and improve "strategic awareness".

Government offices
| Preceded by Wang Yuqing [zh] | Director of the National Nuclear Safety Administration; 2006–2016 | Succeeded by Liu Hua [zh] |
| Preceded by Chen Jining | Minister of Environmental Protection; 2017–2018 | Post abolished |
| New title | Minister of Ecology and Environment; 2018–2020 | Succeeded by Huang Runqiu |
| Preceded by Gong Zheng | Governor of Shandong; 2020–2021 | Succeeded by Zhou Naixiang |
Party political offices
| Preceded by Zhao Yong | Deputy Party Secretary of Hebei; 2016–2017 | Succeeded by Zhao Yide |
| New title | Party Secretary of the Ministry of Ecology and Environment; 2018–2020 | Succeeded by Sun Jinlong |
| Preceded by Liu Jiayi | Party Secretary of Shandong; 2021–2022 | Succeeded by Lin Wu |
| Preceded by Chen Xi | Head of the Organization Department of the Chinese Communist Party; 2023–2025 | Succeeded by Shi Taifeng |
| Preceded by Shi Taifeng | Head of the United Front Work Department; 2025– | Incumbent |
Order of precedence
| Preceded by Chen Jining as Member of the Politburo of the Chinese Communist Party | Order of precedence of China as Member of the Politburo of the Chinese Communist Party | Succeeded by Zhang Guoqing as Member of the Politburo of the Chinese Communist Party |
