= Mei Kebao =

Chinese politician (born 1957)

- 梅克保

Deputy Director of the General Administration of Quality Supervision, Inspection and Quarantine
- In office January 2013 – May 2017
- Preceded by: Yang Gang
- Succeeded by: Hou Jianguo

Deputy Party Chief of Hunan
- In office November 2006 – January 2013
- Preceded by: Sun Zaifu
- Succeeded by: Sun Jinlong

Party Chief of Changsha
- In office August 2001 – November 2006
- Preceded by: Zhang Yunchuan
- Succeeded by: Chen Run'er

Party Chief of Hengyang
- In office February 1999 – August 2001
- Preceded by: Yan Yongsheng
- Succeeded by: Xu Minghua

Party Chief of Chenzhou
- In office September 1994 – February 1999
- Preceded by: New position
- Succeeded by: Li Dalun

Party Chief of Liuyang
- In office July 1992 – September 1994
- Preceded by: Zou Shuisheng
- Succeeded by: Xie Shulin

Personal details
- Born: March 1957 (age 69) Hanshou County, Hunan, China
- Party: Chinese Communist Party
- Education: Hunan Agricultural University; Central South University; Hunan University of Arts and Science; Central Party School of the Chinese Communist Party

Mei Kebao (Chinese: 梅克保; pinyin: Méi Kèbǎo; born March 1957) is a retired Chinese politician. Before his retirement, he was deputy director of the General Administration of Quality Supervision, Inspection and Quarantine. Previously he served as Chinese Communist Party Deputy Committee Secretary of Hunan, party chief of Changsha, party chief of Hengyang, and party chief of Chenzhou. In all, he had served in four cities at municipal level of the Chinese government.

He was a delegate to the 16th and 17th National Congress of the Chinese Communist Party. He was also an alternate member of the 17th and 18th Central Committee of the Chinese Communist Party.

== Biography ==
Mei was born in Hanshou County, Hunan, in March 1957. After the Resumption of University Entrance Examination in 1977, he was accepted to Hunan University of Arts and Science, majoring in agriculture. After graduation, he taught there. He also studied as a part-time student at Hunan Agricultural University, Central South University and the Central Party School of the Chinese Communist Party.

Mei joined the Chinese Communist Party in May 1979 and entered the workforce in February 1980.

In December 1985 he was promoted to become deputy party chief of Changde County, a position he held until February 1987.

He was deputy secretary of Hunan Provincial Committee of the Communist Youth League in February 1987, and held that office until July 1992.

In July 1992, he was transferred to Liuyang and appointed the party chief, the top political position in the city.

In September 1994, he was transferred again to Chenzhou, where he served as party chief there.

In February 1999, he was elected party chief of Hengyang, replacing Yan Yongsheng.

In August 2001, Mei was transferred to Changsha, capital of central China's Hunan province, as the top political position in the city.

In November 2006 he was promoted again to become deputy party chief of Hunan, he remained in that position until January 2013, when he was transferred to Beijing and appointed deputy director of the General Administration of Quality Supervision, Inspection and Quarantine.

Mei retired in May 2017.

Party political offices
Preceded by Zou Shuisheng	Party Chief of Liuyang; 1992–1994	Succeeded by Xie Shjulin
Preceded by New position	Party Chief of Chenzhou; 1994–1999	Succeeded by Li Dalun (李大伦)
Preceded by Yan Yongsheng (颜永盛)	Party Chief of Hengyang; 1999–2001	Succeeded by Xu Minghua (徐明华)
Preceded by Zhang Yunchuan	Party Chief of Changsha; 2001–2006	Succeeded by Chen Run'er
Preceded by Sun Zaifu	Deputy Party Chief of Hunan; 2006–2013	Succeeded by Sun Jinlong
Government offices
Preceded by Yang Gang	Deputy Director of the General Administration of Quality Supervision, Inspection and Quarantine; 2013–2017	Succeeded by Hou Jianguo
