= 2005 Jilin chemical plant explosions =

Industrial incident in Jilin, China

Coordinates: 43°53′07″N 126°36′16″E

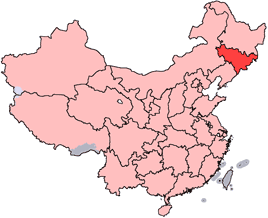
The location of the Jilin Province of China

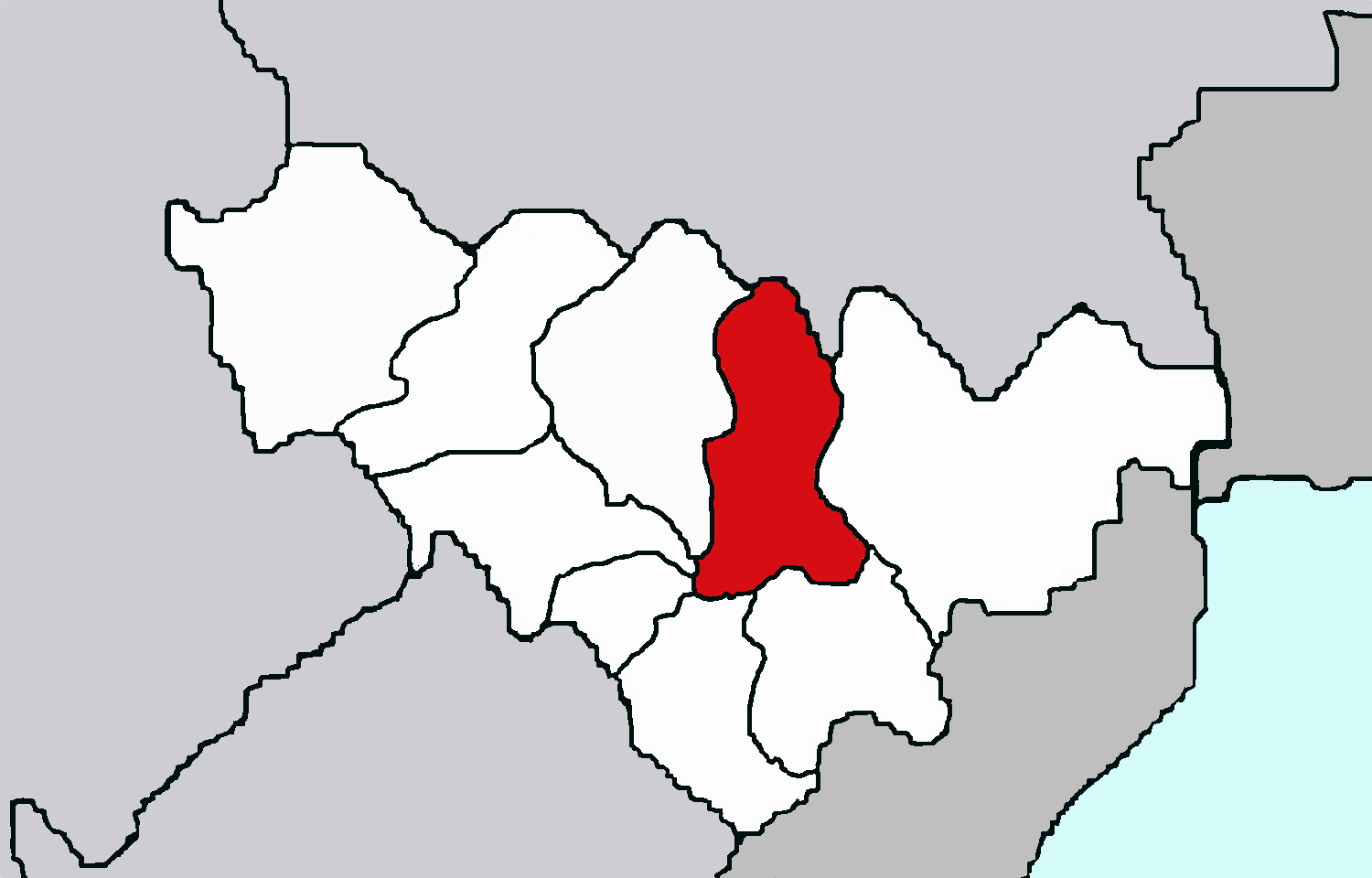
Jilin City

The Jilin chemical plant explosions were a series of explosions which occurred on November 13, 2005, in the No.102 Petrochemical Plant in Jilin City, Jilin Province, China, over the period of an hour. The explosions killed six, injured dozens, and caused the evacuation of tens of thousands of residents.

== Explosions ==
The cause of the blasts was initially determined two days after the blast: the accident site was a nitration unit for aniline equipment. The T-102 tower was jammed up and was not handled properly. The blasts were so powerful that they shattered windows at least 100 to 200 meters away; at least 70 people were injured and six were killed. The fires were finally put out early in the morning of November 14. Over 10,000 people were evacuated from the area, including local residents and students at the north campus of Beihua University and Jilin Institute of Chemical Technology, for fear of further explosions and contamination with harmful chemicals. The CNPC, which owns the company in charge of the factory, Jilin Petrochemical Corporation, asked senior officials to investigate the cause of the incidents. The explosions were not thought to be related to terrorism, and the company told a press conference that they had occurred as a result of a chemical blockage that had gone unfixed.

The municipal government asked hotels and restaurants in the city to provide rooms for the evacuated people. Taxi companies also aided in the evacuation.

== Water pollution ==
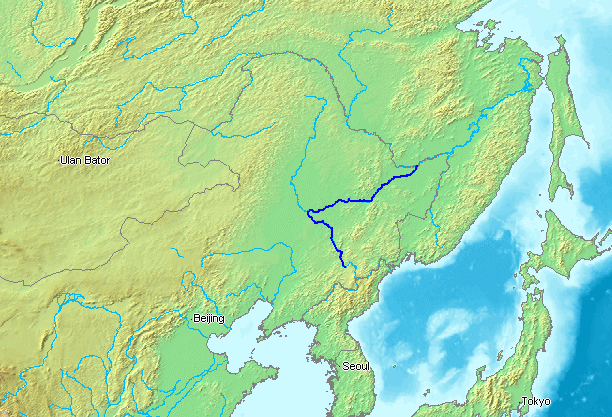
The Songhua River

The explosion severely polluted the Songhua River, with an estimated 100 tons of pollutants containing benzene and nitrobenzene entering into the river. Exposure to benzene reduces red blood cell count and is linked to leukemia.

An 80 km long toxic slick drifted down the Amur River, and the benzene level recorded was at one point 108 times above national safety levels. The slick passed first on the Songhua River through several counties and cities of Jilin province, including Songyuan; it then entered the province of Heilongjiang, with Harbin, capital of Heilongjiang province and one of China's largest cities, being one of the first places to be affected. After traversing the eastern half of Heilongjiang including the city of Jiamusi, the slick converged into the Amur River at the mouth of the Songhua on the border between China and Russia. It passed by the Jewish Autonomous Oblast in Russia, then entered the Russian region of Khabarovsk Krai in the Russian Far East, passing through the cities of Khabarovsk and Komsomolsk-on-Amur before exiting into the Strait of Tartary, itself a bridge between the Sea of Okhotsk and the Sea of Japan portions of the Pacific Ocean.

=== Jilin Province ===
On November 13, a water plant in Jilin city, Jilin, was closed. Several hydropower stations in the upper reach of Songhua River began to increase their discharge flow. On November 15, Songyuan, Jilin, stopped using water from Songhua River. By November 18, water supplies in Songyuan, Jilin, were partially suspended. Water supplies in Songyuan, Jilin, were restored on November 23.

=== Heilongjiang Province ===
Harbin, the capital of Heilongjiang, is one of China's biggest cities with nearly ten million urban residents. It is also dependent on the Songhua River for its water supply.

On November 21, the city government of Harbin announced that water supplies would be shut off at noon November 22 for four days for maintenance. Some residents of Harbin have complained that water in some parts of the city had been shut off much earlier than announced. The city also ordered all bathhouses and carwashes to close. At the same time as the enigmatic announcement, rumours ran wild about the possible cause of the shutoff, with some suggesting that an earthquake was imminent (causing some people to camp outdoors) and others claiming that terrorists had poisoned the city's water supply. The news of the shutoff caused panic buying of water, beverages, and foodstuffs in the city's supermarkets, while train tickets and flights out of the area were soon sold out. Meanwhile, dead fish were appearing along the banks of the Songhua upstream from Harbin, further compounding the fears of Harbin residents.

Later on the same day, the city government issued another announcement, this time explicitly mentioning the Jilin explosions as the reason for the shutoff. The four-day shutoff was postponed to midnight on November 24. From 9 a.m. to 8 p.m. on November 23, the city temporarily restored the water supply to allow residents to stock up on water, since the slick had not yet reached the city. In the afternoon of the same day, schools in Harbin were closed for one week. Also on November 23, Harbin residents began to receive water from fire trucks, and began voluntary evacuation.

The slick itself reached Harbin before dawn on November 24. On that day, the nitrobenzene level at Harbin was recorded at 16.87 times above the national safety level, while the benzene level was increasing, but had not yet exceeded national safety level. The nitrobenzene level doubled on November 25 (0.5805 mg/L), 33.15 times the national safety level, and began to decrease. The benzene level stayed under national safety level. At the same time, the tail of the slick left Zhaoyuan, Daqing, Heilongjiang. Premier Wen Jiabao of the State Council visited Harbin on November 26 to inspect the current situation, including the status of water pollution and water supply.

In response to the crisis, trucks transported tens of thousands of metric tons of water from surrounding cities, and thousands of tons of activated carbon from all over the country to Harbin. The government of Harbin also ordered the price of drinking water to be frozen at the level of November 20, in order to combat overpricing. In addition, Harbin bored ninety-five more deep-water wells, to complement the existing 918 deep-water wells in the city. Fifteen hospitals were on stand-by for possible poisoning victims.

Harbin was not the only city to be affected. The slick passed through the city of Jiamusi, which, however, relies more heavily on underground water supply, and thus did not cut off water supplies. Nevertheless, on December 2, Jiamusi shut down its No. 7 Water Plant, which supplies around 70% of the city's water supply, and evacuated half of the population on its Liushu island.

It is reported that the entry of several tributaries into the Songhua, such as the Hulan River and the Mudan River, diluted the slick.

Water supply in Harbin was resumed in the evening of November 27.

=== Khabarovsk Krai ===
The slick reached the Amur River on December 16, and arrived at the Russian city of Khabarovsk four to five days later. In readiness, a communications hotline had been set up between Chinese and Russian agencies, and China offered water testing and purifying materials, including 1,000 tons of activated carbon to Russia. Khabarovsk planned to shut off its water supply in "extreme circumstances", prompting residents to stock up on water.

== Maritime pollution ==
After exiting the Amur River, the contaminants entered the Strait of Tartary and then the Sea of Okhotsk and the Sea of Japan, which have Japan, Korea and Far-East Russia on its littorals.

== Political fall-out ==
Xie Zhenhua, China's Minister of State Environmental Protection Administration, resigned and was succeeded by Zhou Shengxian, former director of the State Forestry Administration.

== Criticism ==
The Chinese press were critical of the authorities' response to the disaster. Jilin Petrochemicals, which runs the plant that suffered the explosions, initially denied that the explosion could have leaked any pollutants into the Songhua River, saying that it produced only water and carbon dioxide. The media has focused mostly on Harbin, with almost no information on the slick's effect on cities and counties in Jilin province. Heilongjiang responded to the crisis a full week after the explosions occurred—their initial announcement attributed the impending shutoff to "maintenance", and gave only a day's notice; it was the second announcement on the next day that clarified the reason for the shutoff and postponed the shutoff. In response, Vice Governor Jiao Zhengzhong of Jilin province and Deputy General Manager Zeng Yukang of CNPC have visited Harbin and expressed their apologies to the city. On 6 December, the vice-mayor of Jilin, Wang Wei, was found dead in his home. This followed a threat by the Chinese government to severely punish anyone who had covered up the severity of the accident. The threat applied only to the initial explosion and not the extended cover-up of the benzene slick.

== See also ==
- Environment of China
- Pollution in China
