= Minister of Ecology and Environment =

Minister of the People's Republic of China

Minister of Ecology and Environment of the People's Republic of China
- 中华人民共和国生态环境部部长
- National Emblem of China

- Flag of China

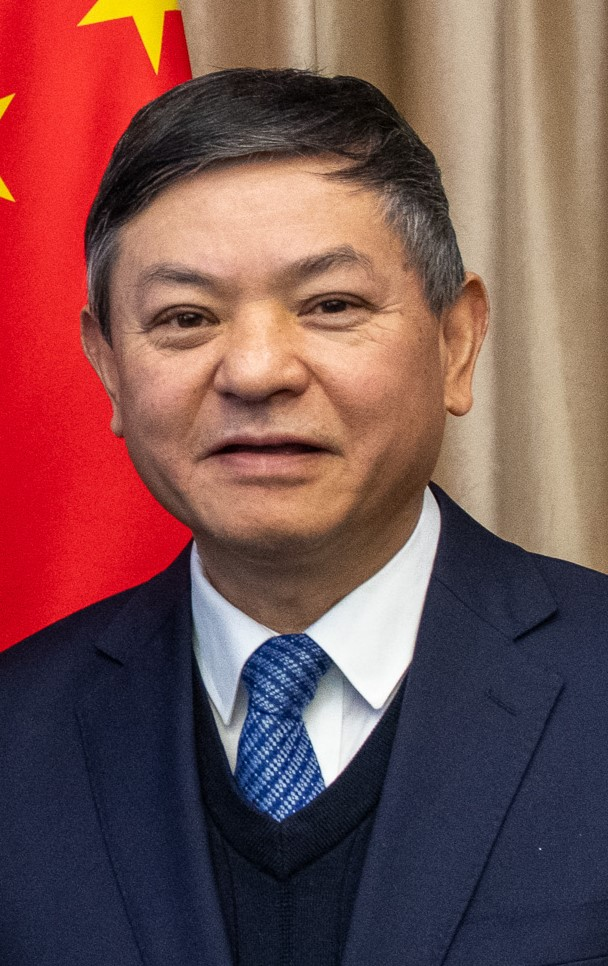
- Incumbent; Huang Runqiu since 29 April 2020
- Ministry of Ecology and Environment
- Status: Provincial and ministerial-level official
- Member of: Plenary Meeting of the State Council
- Seat: Ministry of Ecology and Environment Building, Dongcheng District, Beijing
- Nominator: Premier (chosen within the Chinese Communist Party)
- Appointer: President with the confirmation of the National People's Congress or its Standing Committee
- Formation: 1987; 39 years ago
- First holder: Qu Geping
- Deputy: Vice Minister of Ecology and Environment

The minister of ecology and environment of the People's Republic of China is the head of the Ministry of Ecology and Environment of the People's Republic of China and a member of the State Council. Within the State Council, the position is fifteenth in order of precedence. The minister is responsible for leading the ministry, presiding over its meetings, and signing important documents related to the ministry. Officially, the minister is nominated by the premier of the State Council, who is then approved by the National People's Congress or its Standing Committee and appointed by the president.

The current minister is Huang Runqiu, who concurrently serves as the Chinese Communist Party Committee Secretary of the ministry.

== List of ministers ==
No.	Name	Took office	Left office	Ref.
Director of State Environmental Protection Agency
1	Qu Geping	1987	June 1993	
2	Xie Zhenhua	June 1993	March 1998	
Director of State Environmental Protection Administration
(2)	Xie Zhenhua	March 1998	December 2005	
3	Zhou Shengxian	December 2005	March 2008	
Minister of Environmental Protection
(3)	Zhou Shengxian	March 2008	February 2015	
4	Chen Jining	February 2015	June 2017	
5	Li Ganjie	June 2017	March 2018	
Minister of Ecology and Environment
(5)	Li Ganjie	March 2018	April 2020	
(6)	Huang Runqiu	April 2020	Incumbent	
