= Head of the United Front Work Department =

Chinese Communist Party position

Head of the United Front Work Department of the Central Committee of the Chinese Communist Party
- 中国共产党中央委员会统一战线工作部部长
- Emblem of the Chinese Communist Party

- Flag of the Chinese Communist Party

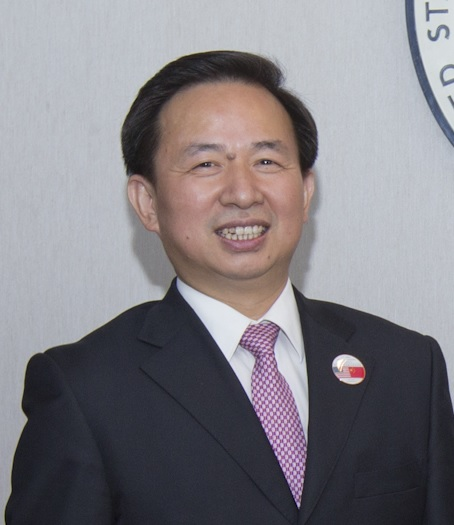
- Incumbent; Li Ganjie since April 2, 2025
- United Front Work Department
- Type: Department Head
- Status: Provincial and ministerial-level official
- Seat: Beijing
- Nominator: Central Committee
- Appointer: Central Committee
- Inaugural holder: Zhou Enlai
- Formation: 1938
- Deputy: Deputy Head

The head of the United Front Work Department of the Central Committee of the Chinese Communist Party is the leader of the United Front Work Department (UFWD), a department of the Central Committee of the Chinese Communist Party (CCP).

The head of the United Front Work Department has generally served as the first-ranking vice chairperson of the Chinese People's Political Consultative Conference. Though not required by law, the UFWD head also serves as the executive vice president of the China Council for the Promotion of Peaceful National Reunification. The current head of the United Front Work Department is Li Ganjie, who is also a member of the Politburo of the Chinese Communist Party. Li is the first UFWD head to be a member of the Politburo since 1977.

== List of heads ==
During two periods the United Front Work Department was without a leader, from 1966 to 1975 during the Cultural Revolution and from the end of 1989 until 22 November 1990 following the 1989 Tiananmen Square protests and massacre. The UFWD has had two female heads, Liu Yandong (2002–2007) and Sun Chunlan (2014–2017).

Department Head		Term of office		Ref.
Department Head		Took office	Left office	Ref.
Zhou Enlai	周恩来	1938	1942	
Wang Ming	王明	1942	1947	
Zhou Enlai	周恩来	1947	1948	
Li Weihan	李维汉	October 1948	December 1964	
Xu Bing	徐冰	December 1964	1966	
Cultural Revolution Interregnum		1966	1975	
Li Dazhang	李大章	November 1975	May 1976	
Ulanhu	鸟阑夫	May 1976	April 1982	
Yang Jingren	杨静仁	April 1982	November 1985	
Yan Mingfu	阎明复	November 1985	November 1990	
Tiananmen Massacre Interregnum		Late 1989	22 November 1990	
Ding Guangen	丁关根	November 1990	December 1992	
Wang Zhaoguo	王兆国	December 1992	December 2002	
Liu Yandong	刘延东	5 December 2002	2 December 2007	
Du Qinglin	杜青林	2 December 2007	31 August 2012	
Ling Jihua	令计划	1 September 2012	31 December 2014	
Sun Chunlan	孙春兰	31 December 2014	7 November 2017	
You Quan	尤权	7 November 2017	27 October 2022	
Shi Taifeng	石泰峰	27 October 2022	2 April 2025	
Li Ganjie	李干杰	2 April 2025	Incumbent	
