= Xie Zhenhua (politician) =

Chinese politician

- 解振华
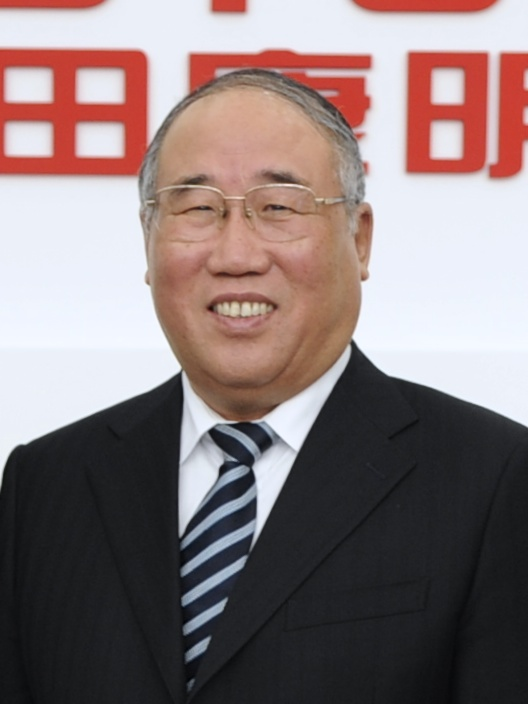
- Xie in 2014
- Born: 1949 (age 76–77); Tianjin, China
- Occupation: Chinese representative on climate change

Xie Zhenhua (Chinese: 解振华; born November 1949) is a Chinese politician who served as vice-chairman of China's top economic development body, the National Development and Reform Commission as well as serving as China's special climate envoy.

== Early life and education ==
Xie Zhenhua was born in Tianjin. During the Cultural Revolution he was put to work in the countryside. Specifically, he was among the millions of "sent-down youth" who were dispatched to the countryside to retrain their minds through hard labor, and for this Xie was sent to Heihe in the northern province of Heilongjiang. Xie joined the Chinese Communist Party (CCP) in 1969.

He graduated in 1977 from Tsinghua University with an Engineering Physics degree. Xie also earned a master's degree of law from the Department of Environmental Laws, Wuhan University School of Law in 1991.

== Career ==
He was appointed head of the State Environmental Protection Administration in 1998, and during his tenure required companies to comply with environmental rules, but was eventually forced to resign after the 2005 Jilin chemical plant explosions.

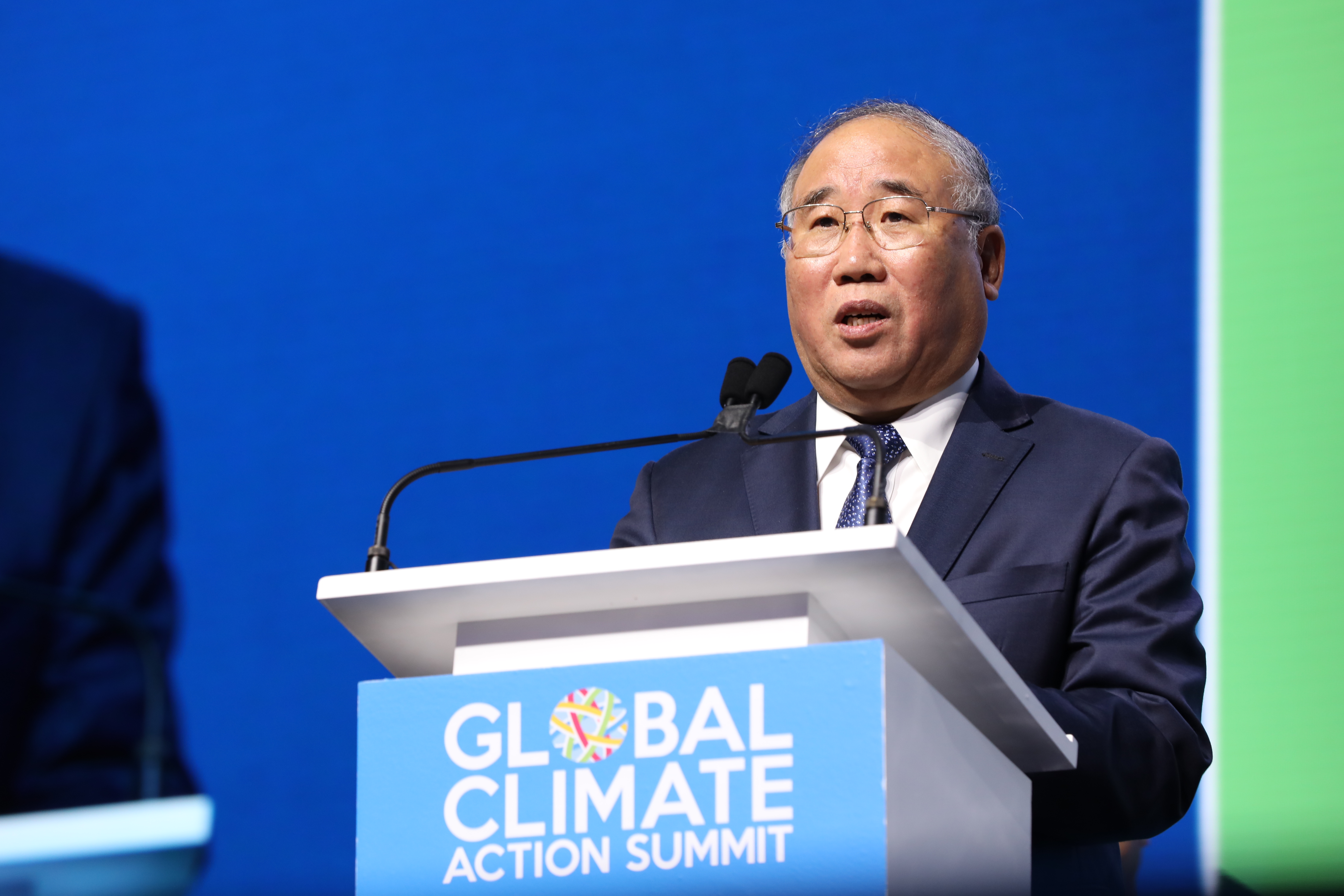
Xie speaking at the Global Climate Action Summit in 2018.

In 2007 Xie was appointed vice minister at the National Development and Reform Commission. In 2015 he stepped down from this position to focus on being a Chinese representative on climate change. He was the lead negotiator for China at most United Nations Climate Change Conferences since 2009. In 2019 he was replaced by his aide Zhao Yingmin, before returning to that role.

Xie's role has been positively received among many foreign politicians and climate change activists, as he has been a driver behind China signing binding commitments to reduce emissions. Xie is seen as "China's voice on climate change". He has emphasized China's stance that rich countries have a greater responsibility regarding climate change than China, though China has been the world's largest carbon emitter since 2006. His speech at the 2010 climate conference in South Africa conveyed this Chinese position:

We are developing countries. We need to develop and eradicate poverty while protecting the environment. We've done what we should do, but you [developed countries] haven't. What right do you have to lecture us?

Xie remains at the forefront of debate over China's economic responsibilities for climate change mitigation, and advocates carbon emission trading (also known as a carbon market), and climate aid to developing countries. He led the Chinese delegation at the 2021 United Nations Climate Change Conference (i.e. COP26) in November of that year.

Xie worked with former California governor Jerry Brown to establish a new center for California-China climate cooperation at University of California, Berkeley. During his time as climate envoy in the 2020s, he befriended John Kerry, his American counterpart, before his retirement.

Xie retired in January 2024 for health reasons. He was replaced by former Vice-Minister for Foreign Affairs of China Liu Zhenmin.

Government offices
Previous: Qu Geping	Director of the State Environmental Protection Administration; June 1993 – December 2005	Next: Zhou Shengxian
