= Zhou Shengxian =

Chinese politician (born 1949)

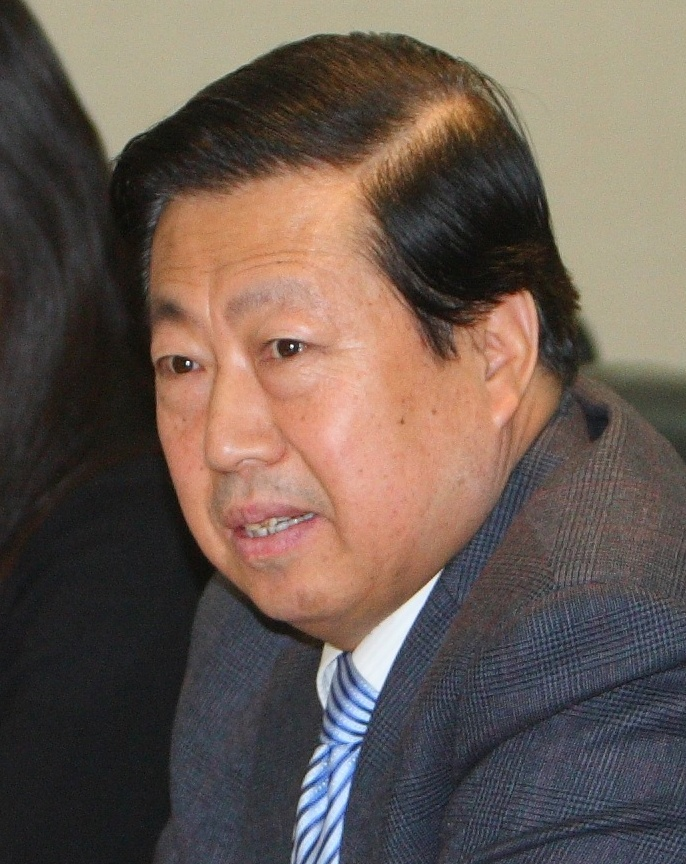
Zhou Shengxian in 2009

Zhou Shengxian (Chinese: 周生贤; born December 1949) is a retired Chinese politician who served as the inaugural Minister of Environmental Protection.

== Biography ==
Zhou was born in Wuzhong, Ningxia Hui Autonomous Region. He joined the Chinese Communist Party in 1972, and is a senior economist. He began his career as a middle school teacher. Eventually he rose to become Secretary-General of the Ningxia Autonomous Regional government, then Vice-Chairman of Ningxia, then he became deputy director of the State Forestry Administration.

He became Minister of Environmental Protection in 2008, after the ministry was reformed from the Environment Protection Bureau. The ministry was given more powers than the Bureau. He left office as environmental protection minister in 2015 due to having reached the mandatory retirement age of 65 for minister-level officials. Since then he has become a member of the Chinese People's Political Consultative Conference, and sits on the Committee of Population, Resources and Environment.

Zhou was an alternate of the 16th Central Committee of the Chinese Communist Party, and a full member of the 17th and 18th Central Committees.

Government offices
Previous: Xie Zhenhua	Minister of Environmental Protection; March 2008 – February 2015	Next: Chen Jining
