= Che Jun =

Chinese politician (born 1955)

- 车俊

Party Secretary of Zhejiang
- In office 26 April 2017 – 31 August 2020
- Deputy: Yuan Jiajun
- Preceded by: Xia Baolong
- Succeeded by: Yuan Jiajun

Director of the Zhejiang Provincial People's Congress
- In office July 2017 – September 2020
- Preceded by: Xia Baolong
- Succeeded by: Yuan Jiajun

Governor of Zhejiang
- In office 4 July 2016 – 28 April 2017
- Preceded by: Li Qiang
- Succeeded by: Yuan Jiajun

Personal details
- Born: July 1955 (age 71) Chaohu, Anhui
- Party: Chinese Communist Party
- Education: Central Party School of the Chinese Communist Party

Che Jun (Chinese: 车俊; born July 1955) is a Chinese politician, serving since 2017 as the Party Secretary of Zhejiang. Between 2016 and 2017, he served as Governor of Zhejiang. Che began his career in Anhui province, and rose to prominence taking charge of Shijiazhuang in the aftermath of the Chinese milk scandal and being dispatched to Xinjiang following the July 2009 Ürümqi riots.

== Biography ==
Che was born in Chaohu, Anhui province. He joined the Chinese Communist Party in December 1973. He obtained an economic administration degree from the Central Party School.

Che began his career in his native Anhui province, first working for the Hefei Intermediate People's Court as a legal assistant, then deputy president and president of the court. In 1989, he entered the Hefei city government, and became the city's police chief. He was then named mayor of Hefei. In 2001, he was named party chief of Hefei.

In 2005, Che left his native province to work in Hebei as the head of the provincial Political and Legal Affairs Commission. A year later, he was named Organization Department head of Hebei province. In May 2008, he became Deputy Party Secretary of Hebei. In August 2008, due to the Chinese milk scandal which originated in products of Sanlu, headquartered in the capital of Hebei, Shijiazhuang, Che was named party chief of Shijiazhuang, replacing Wu Xianguo who was dismissed due to the scandal.

In May 2010, Che headed to the far west region of Xinjiang, becoming Deputy Party Secretary, the Political Commissar of the Xinjiang Production and Construction Corps, and chief executive of the China Xinjian Group Corporation. In September 2010 he was confirmed as a provincial-level official. On April 30, 2015, Che was relieved of his position as Political Commissar of the Xinjiang Production and Construction Corps; he has since then held only one office - that of deputy party chief of Xinjiang.

On July 4, 2016, Che was transferred out of Xinjiang and headed back east, where he became acting Governor of Zhejiang; he was duly confirmed as governor on January 20, 2017. In April 2017, Che was appointed as the Party Secretary of Zhejiang.

On October 17, 2020, Che was appointed as the Deputy Chairperson of the National People's Congress Supervisory and Judicial Affairs Committee.

Che has been an alternate of the 17th Central Committee of the Chinese Communist Party, and a full member of the 18th and 19th Central Committees.

Party political offices
Preceded by Xia Baolong	Party Secretary of Zhejiang; 2017–2020	Succeeded by Yuan Jiajun
Government offices
Preceded by Li Qiang	Governor of Zhejiang; 2016–2017	Succeeded by Yuan Jiajun
Political offices
Preceded by Nie Weiguo	Political Commissar of the Xinjiang Production and Construction Corps; 2010–2015	Succeeded by Han Yong
