= Huang Runqiu =

Chinese geologist and politician

- 黄润秋
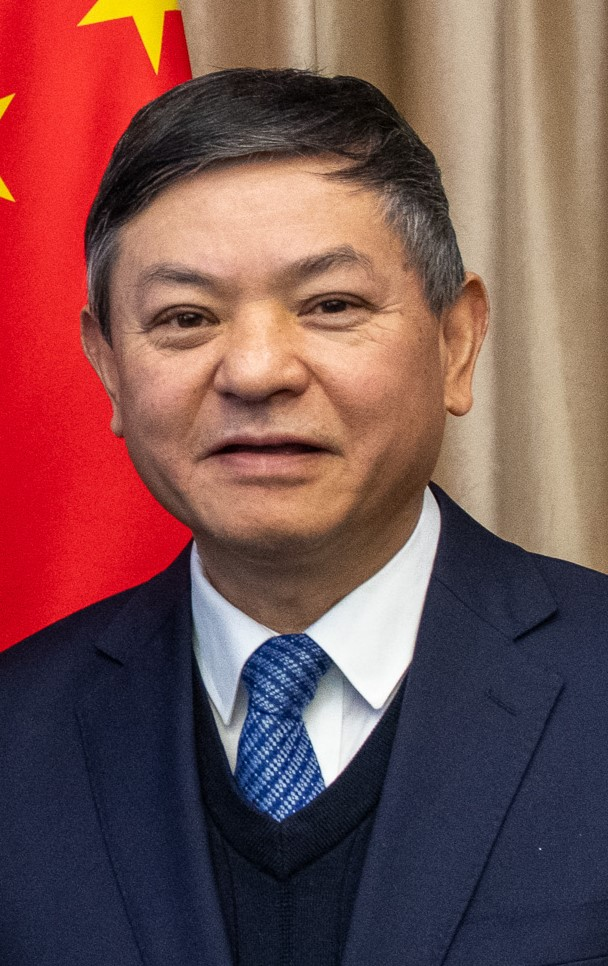
- Huang Runqiu in 2023

Minister of Ecology and Environment
- Incumbent
- Assumed office 29 April 2020
- Premier: Li Keqiang; Li Qiang
- Preceded by: Li Ganjie

Vice Chairman of the Jiusan Society
- Incumbent
- Assumed office 7 December 2017
- Chairman: Wu Weihua

Personal details
- Born: August 1963 (age 62) Changsha, Hunan, China
- Party: Jiusan Society
- Education: PhD
- Alma mater: Chengdu University of Technology

Chinese name
- Traditional Chinese: 黃潤秋
- Simplified Chinese: 黄润秋
Transcriptions
Standard Mandarin
- Hanyu Pinyin: Huáng Rùnqiū

Huang Runqiu (Chinese: 黄润秋; pinyin: Huáng Rùnqiū; born August 1963) is a Chinese geologist and politician currently serving as Minister of Ecology and Environment. He is a member of the Jiusan Society and the third minister not from the Chinese Communist Party since the reform and opening-up in the late 1970s.

== Biography ==
Huang was born in Changsha, Hunan, in August 1963. After high school, he studied (and obtained bachelor's, master's and doctoral degrees), and then taught, at what is now Chengdu University of Technology (former Chengdu Institute of Technology), becoming the vice-president of Chengdu University of Technology and the director of the State Key Laboratory of Geohazard Prevention and Geoenvironment Protection in November 2001.

In December 2007, he was elected a member of the Standing Committee of the Jiusan Society, one of the eight minor non-Communist parties in China. In January 2018, he was appointed vice chairman of the Sichuan Provincial Committee of the Chinese People's Political Consultative Conference (CPPCC). In January 2014, he was appointed vice chairman of the Standing Committee of the Sichuan People's Congress, he remained in that position until March 2016, when he was transferred to Beijing and appointed as a vice minister of the Ministry of Environmental Protection, which was reshuffled as the Ministry of Ecology and Environment in March 2018. On April 29, 2020, he was elevated to the minister of Ecology and Environment, replacing Li Ganjie. He has concurrently served as the vice chairman of the Jiusan Society since December 2017.

He was a member of the 9th, 10th, and 11th National Committee of the Chinese People's Political Consultative Conference. He was a delegate to the 12th National People's Congress. In 2018, he was elected as a member of the 13th Standing Committee of the Chinese People's Political Consultative Conference.

Huang held the presidency position during the 2022 United Nations Biodiversity Conference.

Government offices
Preceded by Li Ganjie	Minister of Ecology and Environment; 2020	Incumbent
