= Momo (software) =

Instant messaging software

- Type: Public
- Traded as: Nasdaq: MOMO
- Industry: Internet
- Founded: July 2011; 15 years ago in Beijing, China
- Founders: Tang Yan; Zhang Sichuan; Lei Xiaoliang; Yong Li; Li Zhiwei
- Headquarters: Beijing, China
- Area served: China
- Key people: Li Wang (CEO); Jonathan Xiaosong Zhang (CFO)
- Products: Social mobile app
- Owner: Hello Group Inc.
- Website: immomo.com

Momo (Chinese: 陌陌; pinyin: mò mò) is a free social search and instant messaging mobile app. The app allows users to chat with nearby friends and strangers. Momo provides users with free instant messaging services through Wifi, 3G and 4G. The client software is available for Android, iOS, and Windows Phone.

Momo officially began operations in July 2011, and a month later, launched the first version of the app for iOS. Momo filed for a NASDAQ IPO on November 7, 2014 and was listed in December 2014.

== History ==
=== Founding and incorporation ===
Tang Yan, Zhang Sichuan, Lei Xiaoliang, Yong Li, and Li Zhiwei co-founded Beijing Momo Technology Co., Ltd. in July 2011. Prior to founding the company, Tang Yan worked as editor and then editor-in-chief at NetEase. In October 2014, Tang was named by Fortune Magazine as one of its "40 Under 40," a list of the most powerful business elites under the age of 40. The other co-founders all have prior experience with major Chinese Internet companies. In order to facilitate foreign investments, Momo's co-founders incorporated a holding company called Momo Technology Company Limited in the British Virgin Islands in November 2011. In July 2014, Momo Technology Company Limited was renamed to Momo Inc. and re-domiciled to the Cayman Islands. In December 2011, Momo established Momo Technology HK Company Limited (Momo HK) as a wholly owned subsidiary in Hong Kong. In March 2012, Momo HK established Beijing Momo Information Technology Co., Ltd. (Beijing Momo IT), a wholly owned People's Republic of China subsidiary. In May 2013, Beijing Momo established Chengdu Momo Technology Co., Ltd. (Chengdu Momo), as a wholly owned subsidiary.

=== Growth ===
In December 2011, Momo announced reaching half a million users. Three months later, the number of Momo users reached 2 million. Momo reached 10 million users on its first anniversary in August 2012. In October 2012, Momo surpassed 15 million users. In 2014, App Annie reported that Momo was the number 2 non-game app of 2013 in terms of revenue. In February 2014, TechNode reported that Momo had announced reaching 100 million registered users. Momo executives also claimed they had reached 40 million monthly active users (MAU). According to Momo, in June 2014, total registered users and MAU reached 148 million and 52.4 million respectively. China Internet Watch reported more conservative estimates. In the months of August and September 2014, Momo had 51.279 and 52.101 million MAU. While Momo's MAU grew, Wechat and QQ both lost MAU within the same time frame. Momo's prospectus reported 60.2 million MAU in September 2014.

=== Financing ===
Momo reportedly raised USD 2.5 million in Series A financing. Angel investor, PurpleSky Capital (ZiHui ChuangTou), and Matrix Hong Kong led this round of financing. However, Momo's Form F-1 filed with the SEC reports that USD 5 million was raised in this round of financing. Momo Inc. completed its Series B financing in October 2012. This round of financing was led by two institution investors and received $100 million valuation. China Renaissance Partners acted as the exclusive financial advisor. There was much speculation as to whether or not Chinese e-commerce giant, Alibaba Group, was involved in this round of financing. Momo's registration statement verifies this claim. In total, Momo raised approximately USD 40 million. In October 2013, raised USD 45 million in Series C financing. Matrix Hong Kong, Gothic Partners, L.P., PJF Acorn I Trust, Gansett Partners, L.L.C., PH momo investment Ltd., Tenzing Holding 2011 Ltd., Alibaba Investment Limited, and DST Team Fund Limited were all issued and sold Series C preferred shares.

== Product and services ==
Momo's mobile application is available on Android, iOS, and Windows platforms. It enables users to establish and expand their social relationships based on similar locations and interests. Some features of the application include subsections like: Nearby Users, Groups, Message Board, Topics, and Nearby Events. Users can send multimedia instant messages as well as play single and multiplayer games within the app's platform. Users also make a Facebook-like profile and are encouraged to include as much information as possible. Momo execs claim that this allows their software to create more accurate matches with nearby strangers. Momo is claimed to "sift through the clutter of mobile Internet users to find personalized matches for its users". Momo offers users paid membership subscriptions. A membership will cost around USD 2 a month, or less if a user commits to a longer term of use. Benefits of a paid membership include: VIP logos, advanced search options, discounts in the emoticon store, higher limits on maximum users in a group, and the ability to see a list of recent visitors to a user's profile page. As of September 30, 2014, there was 2.3 million paid subscriptions. Like many other instant messaging services, Momo has integrated mobile games into their platform to monetize off their large user base. Third parties develop games, and revenues from in-game purchases are shared between Momo and the developers.

In August 2014, Momo launched Dao Dian Tong, a marketing tool for local merchants. Through Dao Dian Tong, local businesses and merchants can construct profile pages that allow Momo users to find them with the Momo's LBS. Members can see the businesses just as they would see other Momo users. Momo plans to further monetize user traffic by referring users from the Momo platform to e-commerce companies. Alibaba was specifically mentioned in Momo's Form F-1.

== Corporate affairs and cultures ==
=== Anti-plagiarism ===
In December 2012, Momo made an official announcement to accuse Sina Corp of copycatting straight from all the features of Momo Group. However, Sina Corp did not give its formal response.

=== Statement made by NetEase ===
On December 10, 2014, NetEase released a statement accusing that Tang Yan has professional ethic issues, business ethics issues, and has been detained due to personal affairs by the local police in 2007.

== Public opinions ==
=== Hook-ups and homeless dogs ===
On April 27, 2012, Mike Sui, a mixed-race comedian and performer in China, first posted his "12 Beijingers" viral video which attracted nearly 5.17 million hits. In this video, one character mentions Momo, for the first time calling it a magical tool to get laid (Chinese: 约炮神器; pinyin: yuē pào shén qì). Momo has spent millions of dollars to reverse the image of Momo as a one-night stand app. Momo, through its Weibo account, continues to engage the online community through various campaigns. Momo's latest online campaign focused on supporting the homeless cats and dogs of China.

=== Relationships ===
Although Momo is widely considered as a social media application, there are claims that meetings on Momo resulted in marriage.

== See also ==
- Comparison of online dating services
- Timeline of online dating services
