= Hunan University of Arts and Science =

Provincial public college in Changde, Hunan, China

- 湖南文理学院
- Motto: 博学弘文、明理求真
- Type: Public
- Established: 1999; 27 years ago
- President: Long Xianzhong (龙献忠)
- Academic staff: 1,059 (2019)
- Students: 24,000 (2019)
- Location: Changde, Hunan, China; 29°03′06″N 111°40′00″E
- Campus: Urban
- Website: english.huas.cn

Chinese name
- Traditional Chinese: 湖南文理學院
- Simplified Chinese: 湖南文理学院
Transcriptions
Standard Mandarin
- Hanyu Pinyin: Húnán Wénlǐ Xuéyuàn

The Hunan University of Arts and Science (HUAS; Chinese: 湖南文理学院; lit. 'Hunan Arts and Science College') is a provincial public college in Changde, Hunan, China. Despite its English name, the institute has not been granted university status. The college is under the Hunan Provincial Department of Education.
