= Han Yong =

Chinese politician

- 韩勇

Chairman of the Shaanxi Provincial Committee of the Chinese People's Political Consultative Conference
- In office January 2016 – January 2022
- Preceded by: Ma Zhongping
- Succeeded by: Xu Xinrong

Political Commissar of the Xinjiang Production and Construction Corps
- In office April 2015 – January 2016
- Preceded by: Che Jun
- Succeeded by: Sun Jinlong

Deputy Communist Party Secretary of Xinjiang Uygur Autonomous Region
- In office December 2012 – January 2016
- Preceded by: Yang Gang
- Succeeded by: Sun Jinlong

Personal details
- Born: October 1956 (age 69–70) Jiutai County, Jilin, China
- Party: Chinese Communist Party (1976–2024; expelled)
- Education: Jilin University; Central Party School of the Chinese Communist Party

Chinese name
- Simplified Chinese: 韩勇
- Traditional Chinese: 韓勇
Transcriptions
Standard Mandarin
- Hanyu Pinyin: Hán Yǒng

Han Yong (Chinese: 韩勇; born October 1956) is a former Chinese politician who served as chairman of the Shaanxi Provincial Committee of the Chinese People's Political Consultative Conference between 2016 and 2022. He spent his early career in his native Jilin province, before being transferred to work in Xinjiang in 2004, where he served as regional organization chief, deputy party chief, and political commissar of the Xinjiang Production and Construction Corps.

== Biography ==
Han was born in Jiutai County (now Jiutai District of Changchun), Jilin province. He joined the Chinese Communist Party (CCP) in 1976, the year Mao died. After the Cultural Revolution he studied law at Jilin University.

In his earlier career, Han was a clerk with the provincial prosecution agency of Jilin, then a deputy district prosecutor in Changchun, the provincial capital. He then worked for the provincial prosecution agency. He served as deputy mayor of Yulin, Shaanxi, then head prosecutor of Songyuan, then deputy head prosecutor of Jilin province, then deputy secretary of the provincial Commission for Discipline Inspection, provincial director of supervision, and other positions. He earned an on-the-job graduate degree in international political studies at the CCP Central Party School.

In July 2004 he was moved to Xinjiang to serve on the CCP Provincial Standing Committee and head of the regional Organization Department. In December 2010 he was named deputy regional party chief. In November 2012, he was named an alternate member of the 18th Central Committee of the Chinese Communist Party.

In April 2015, he replaced Che Jun as the Political Commissar of the Xinjiang Production and Construction Corps. He served in the role for less than a year, before being transferred to Shaanxi to become chairman of the Shaanxi Provincial Committee of the Chinese People's Political Consultative Conference.

== Downfall ==
On 19 October 2023, he was suspected of "serious violations of laws and regulations" by the Central Commission for Discipline Inspection (CCDI), the party's internal disciplinary body, and the National Supervisory Commission, the highest anti-corruption agency of China.

On 22 April 2024, he was expelled from the CCP and removed from public office.

On 19 May 2025, Han was sentenced to death with a two-year reprieve, deprived of his political rights for life and had all his personal assets confiscated by the Nanning Intermediate People's Court.

Party political offices
Preceded by Zhou Yuan	Head of the Organization Department of the CCP Xinjiang Uygur Autonomous Regional Committee; 2004–2013	Succeeded by Ma Xuejun
Preceded by Yang Gang	Deputy Communist Party Secretary of Xinjiang Uygur Autonomous Region; 2012–2016	Succeeded by Sun Jinlong
Military offices
Preceded by Che Jun	Political Commissar of the Xinjiang Production and Construction Corps; 2015–2016	Succeeded by Sun Jinlong
Government offices
Preceded by Ma Zhongping	Chairman of the Shaanxi Provincial Committee of the Chinese People's Political Consultative Conference; 2016–2022	Succeeded by Xu Xinrong
