= Xu Dachun =

Chinese Qing-era doctor (1693–1771)

- 徐大椿
- Born: 1693; Wujiang, Jiangsu
- Died: 1771 (aged 77–78); Beijing
- Occupation: Physician
- Era: Qing dynasty

Xu Dachun (Chinese: 徐大椿; pinyin: Xú Dàchūn; 1693–1771), courtesy name Xu Lingtai (Chinese: 徐靈胎; pinyin: Xú Língtāi), also known as Xu Daye (Chinese: 徐大業; pinyin: Xú Dàyè), was a Chinese writer and physician active during the Qing dynasty. Despite having no formal education, he was a celebrated medical authority who authored numerous medical treatises, four of which were fully preserved in the Siku quanshu. Xu spent most of his life in Jiangsu but he died in Beijing.

== Early life ==
Xu was born in 1693 in Wujiang, Jiangsu. His grandfather, Xu Qiu (徐釚; 1636–1708), was a noted artist, historian, and poet, while his father, Xu Yanghao (徐養浩; died c. 1721), was an hydraulic engineer. At the time of Xu's birth, the family's financial situation had taken a turn for the worse. In lieu of a formal education, Xu acquired much knowledge on irrigation from his father. He also taught himself how to read and write, with an emphasis on medicine and philosophy, although he was also interested in astronomy, martial arts, and music.

== Career ==
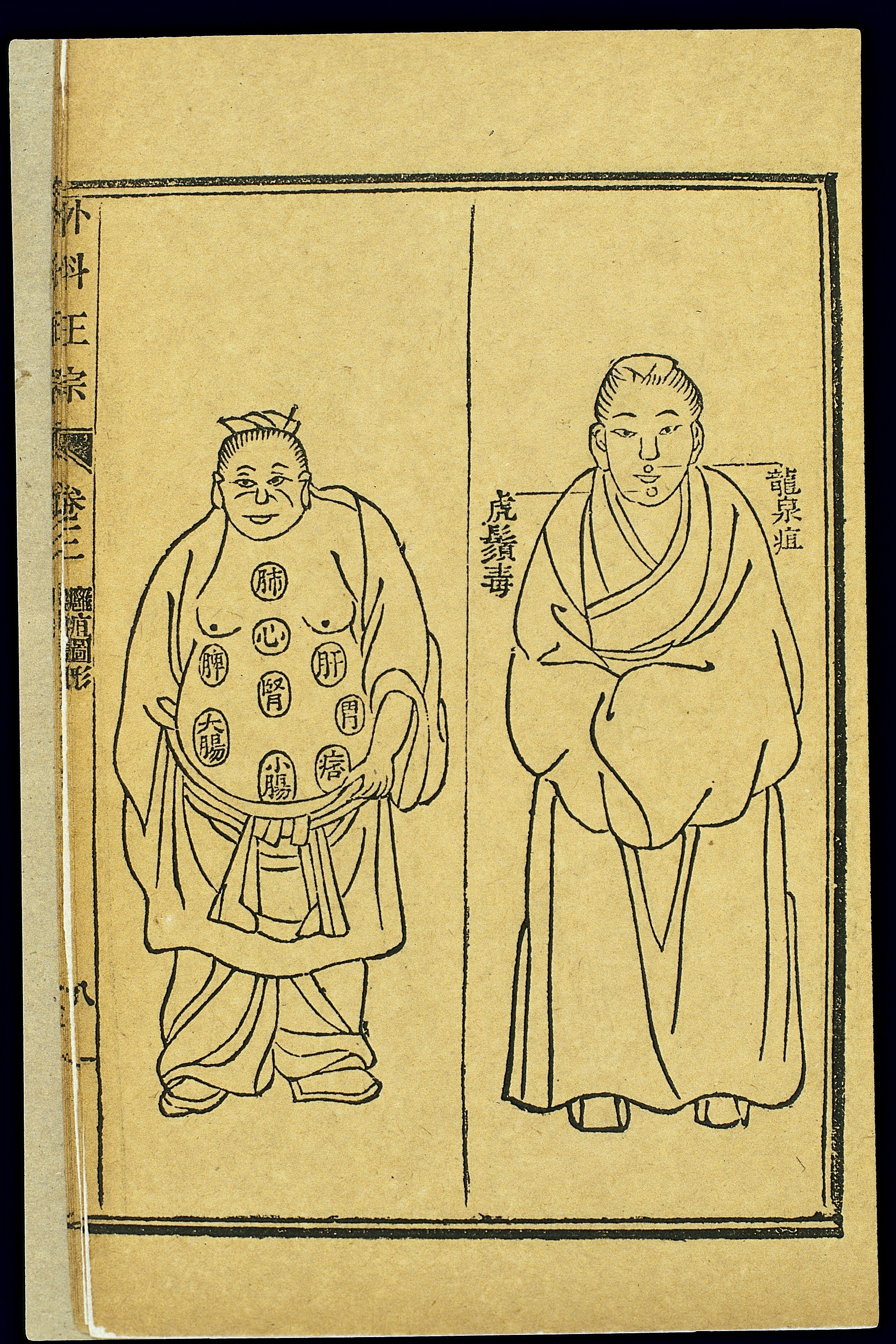
Woodcut from an 1860 edition of the Waike zhengzong ping (外科正宗評) by Xu Dachun.

Described as "a man of tall stature with a wide forehead and a resonant voice", Xu received much acclaim as a physician. He authored commentaries on Chinese medical classics including the Nan jing, the Shennong bencao jing, and the Shanghan lun. In 1757, he published Yixue yuanliu lun (醫學源流論; literally Treatise on the Origin and Development of Medicine). Outside of medicine, Xu also wrote lengthy treatises on irrigation, Taoist philosophy, and zaju (a form of Chinese opera).

== Views ==
Xu robustly defended the practice of medicine, arguing that "humans occupy the most important position on earth, and the fate of humans on earth depends on medicine." However, he conceded that medicine had its limitations—any suggestion that it could help one achieve immortality was "nonsense". He also observed that not all diseases require treating: "I believe that there are some people who, when they get sick, recover spontaneously without treatment, others who struggle to recover without medical intervention, and yet others who cannot recover without medical help and will die."

Xu was a traditionalist who believed that the decline of medicine in China—and Chinese civilisation in general—was due to a "straying from the path of the sages of antiquity". According to him, the Huangdi neijing, believed to be the oldest Chinese medical text, was the "only valid guide to medical practice". However, he also endorsed the works of Zhang Zhongjing, as well as the official Qing dynasty compendium, Yuzuan yizong jinjian.

Xu was highly critical of physicians who attempted to explain medicine in terms of yin and yang or the wuxing (Five Phases). He also believed that people could get possessed by demons and spirits, but only if their qi was deficient, and that drugs which countered "internal body disharmony" were therefore superior to charms and spells in healing the possessed. On the other hand, he warned against the excessive and unnecessary consumption of "replenishing drugs" like ginseng: "Stupid people believe that expensive drugs must be good drugs, while cheap drugs are supposed to be inferior, and it is common human nature to love supplementation and to dislike attack."

== Final years ==
Now an established physician whose advice was highly sought-after, Xu was summoned to Beijing in 1761 to tend to Jiang Pu, a court official and the son of Jiang Tingxi. Xu accurately noted that Jiang's illness was terminal and was subsequently offered a position in the Imperial Medical Department, which he declined.

Xu spent his final years in Huixi (洄溪), a village north of his hometown in Wujiang, and was thereafter referred to as huixi laoren (洄溪老人) or the "Old Man of Huixi". In 1771, Xu received another royal invitation to Beijing. He died the same year, shortly after arriving at the capital with his son Xu Xi (徐爔).

Writing in the Suiyang quanji shortly after his death, biographer Yuan Mei (袁枚) remarked: "(Xu) was especially adept in traditional Chinese medicine; every time he visited with a patient he was so familiar with the system whereby the vital organs of the body are meant to work that he seemingly could communicate with them so that they would be restored to their right condition." Four of Xu's treatises were fully preserved in the 18th-century encyclopedia Siku quanshu.
