= Institute of Geochemistry =

Research institute in Guiyang, China

Institute of Geochemistry (Chinese: 地球化学研究所), which is located in Guiyang, the capital of Guizhou Province of China, was founded in 1966 by the Beijing Institute of Geology, Chinese Academy of Sciences (now Institute of Geology and Geophysics, Chinese Academy of Sciences).

== See also ==
- Geochemistry
