= Xu Xinrong =

Chinese politician (born 1962)

- 徐新荣

Chairman of the Shaanxi Provincial Committee of the Chinese People's Political Consultative Conference
- Incumbent
- Assumed office January 2022
- Preceded by: Han Yong

Personal details
- Born: April 1962 (age 64) Qian County, Shaanxi, China
- Party: Chinese Communist Party
- Education: Central Party School of the Chinese Communist Party; Shaanxi Normal University; Peking University

Chinese name
- Simplified Chinese: 徐新荣
- Traditional Chinese: 徐新榮
Transcriptions
Standard Mandarin
- Hanyu Pinyin: Xú Xīnróng

Xu Xinrong (Chinese: 徐新荣; born April 1962) is a Chinese politician and the current chairman of the Shaanxi Provincial Committee of the Chinese People's Political Consultative Conference, in office since January 2022. He was a delegate to the 12th National People's Congress. He is a representative of the 19th National Congress of the Chinese Communist Party. He is an alternate of the 19th Central Committee of the Chinese Communist Party.

== Biography ==
Xu was born in Qian County, Shaanxi, in April 1962. He graduated from Central Party School of the Chinese Communist Party and Shaanxi Normal University. He also received his MBA degree from the Guanghua School of Management, Peking University.

He got involved in politics in August 1983, and joined the Chinese Communist Party (CCP) in June 1984. In January 1995, he was admitted to member of the standing committee of the CCP Qindu District Committee, the district's top authority, and was appointed governor in November 1997. In June 2000, he was promoted to party secretary, the top political position in the district. In March 2004, he became deputy party secretary of Xianyang, but having held the position for only two years. In February 2008, he was named acting mayor of Weinan, succeeding Cao Lili. He was installed as mayor in March. In February 2013, he rose to become party secretary. It would be his first job as "first-in-charge" of a city. He concurrently served as chairman of Weinan People's Congress since February 2014. He was appointed party secretary of Yan'an in June 2015 and was admitted to member of the standing committee of the CCP Shaanxi Provincial Committee, the province's top authority. In January 2021, he was appointed head of the United Front Department of CCP Shaanxi Provincial Committee, concurrently serving as chairman of the Shaanxi Provincial Committee of the Chinese People's Political Consultative Conference since January 2022, the province's top political advisory body.

Government offices
Preceded by Cao Lili	Mayor of Weinan; 2008–2013	Succeeded by Xi Zhengping
Party political offices
Preceded by Zhang Liyong	Communist Party Secretary of Qindu District; 2000–2004	Succeeded by Li Wenhua
Preceded by Zhuang Changxing	Communist Party Secretary of Weinan; 2013–2015	Succeeded by Lu Zhiyuan
Preceded by Yao Yinliang	Communist Party Secretary of Yan'an; 2015–2021	Succeeded by Zhao Gang
Preceded by Jiang Feng	Head of the United Front Department of CCP Shaanxi Provincial Committee; 2021–present	Incumbent
Assembly seats
Preceded by Han Yong	Chairman of the Shaanxi Provincial Committee of the Chinese People's Political Consultative Conference; 2022–present	Incumbent
