= Ministry of Ecology and Environment =

Department of the State Council of the People's Republic of China

- 中华人民共和国生态环境部
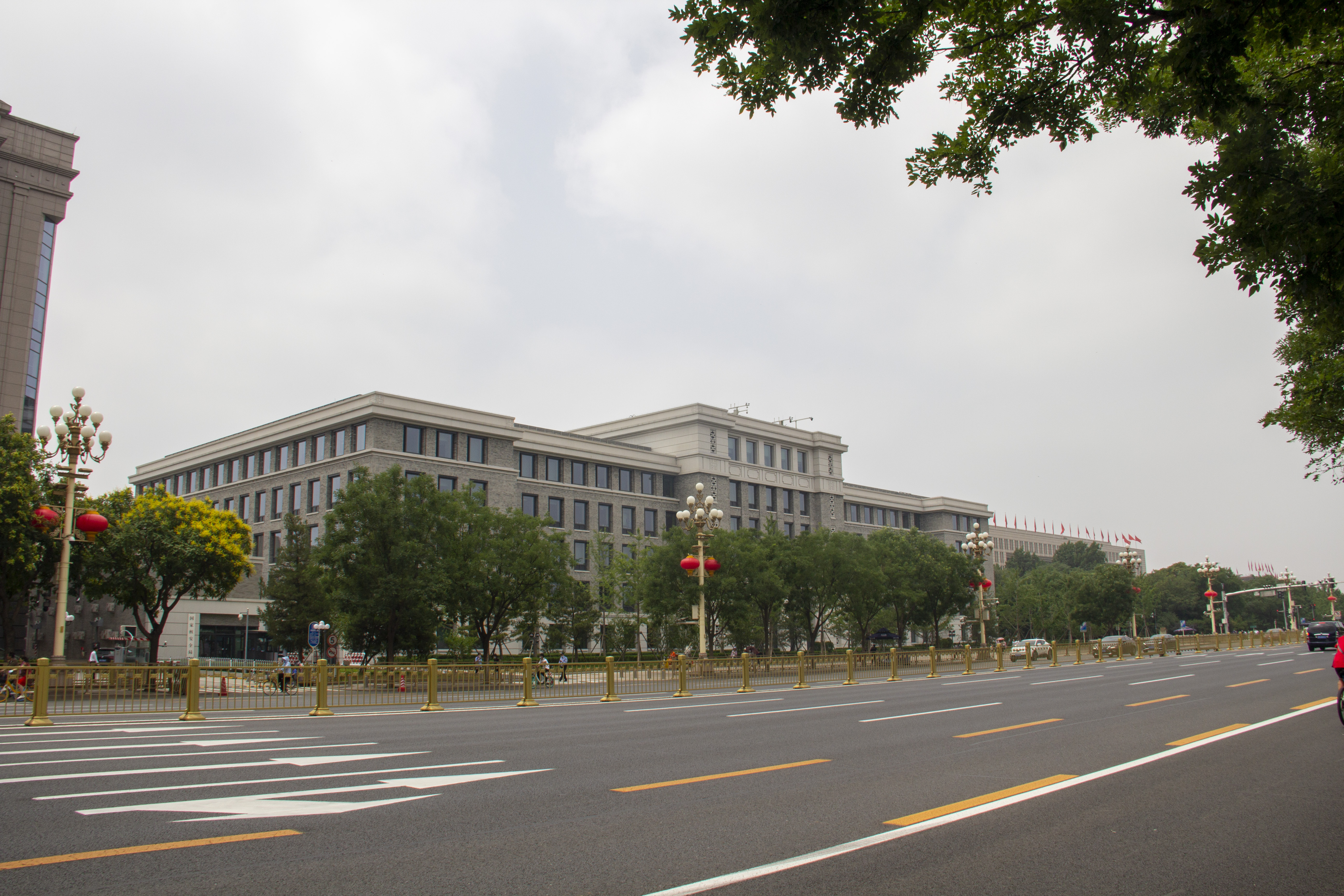

Agency overview
- Formed: 2018; 8 years ago
- Preceding agency: State Environmental Protection Administration
- Type: Constituent Department of the State Council (cabinet-level executive department)
- Jurisdiction: Government of China
- Headquarters: Beijing
- Minister responsible: Huang Runqiu, Minister
- Deputy Ministers responsible: Sun Jinlong, Party Committee Secretary; Zhai Qing; Zhao Yingmin; Guo Fang; Dong Baotong, Administrator of National Nuclear Safety Administration
- Agency executives: Liao Xiyuan, Leader of Discipline Inspection & Supervision Team; Liu Bingjiang, Chief Engineer; Tian Weiyong, Chief Engineer for Nuclear Safety; Xie Zhenhua, Special Envoy for Climate Change (ministerial-level)
- Parent agency: State Council
- Website: www.mee.gov.cn

The Ministry of Ecology and Environment is an executive-department of the State Council of the People's Republic of China, responsible for the ecological and environmental affairs. It is the 15th-ranked department in the State Council.

The Ministry is the nation's environmental protection department charged with the task of protecting China's air, water, and land from pollution and contamination. Directly under the State Council, it is empowered and required by law to implement environmental policies and enforce environmental laws and regulations. Complementing its regulatory role, it funds and organizes research and development.

== History ==
In 1972, Chinese representatives attended the First United Nations Conference on the Human Environment, held in Sweden. The next year, 1973, saw the establishment of the Environmental Protection Leadership Group.

In 1982, the Leadership Group merged with the National City Development Bureau, the National Architectural Engineering Bureau, and the National Cartography Bureau, in addition to part of the National Committee of Infrastructure, to form the Ministry of Urban and Rural Construction Environmental Protection. In 1984, the environmental protection bureau under the ministry was renamed into the State Environmental Protection Bureau before splitting into an independent bureau in 1988. In 1998, the Chinese government promoted the Bureau to a ministry-level agency, which then became the State Environmental Protection Administration.

In July 2008, the Ministry of Environmental Protection (MEP) was established, replacing the State Environmental Protection Administration.

During 2016–2017, the MEP temporarily shut down approximately 40% of all Chinese factories as part of an environmental protection campaign.

Pollutant trading programs were administered under the MEP and local Environmental Protection Bureaus until 2018.

In 2018, the Ministry of Ecology and Environment (MEE) was established as part of the deepening the reform of the Party and state institutions, replacing the MEP. A number of environmental policy functions were merged from other ministries into the MEE, including climate policy previously under the National Development and Reform Commission (NDRC) and a number of environmental policy functions previously under the Ministry of Water Resources and the State Oceanic Administration. Pollutant and carbon emissions trading programs, which had previously been under the MEP's jurisdiction, were also placed within the MEE's control.

In 2019, the MEE established the BRI International Green Development Coalition as a joint project with the environmental agencies of twenty-five other countries.

== Role ==
According to regulations concerning the Ministry, the MEE is responsible for protecting, regulating, and monitoring the environment, as well as enforcing environmental policies. It is responsible for pollution control, conserving the ecosystem, formulating environmental standards, conducting environmental impact assessments, environmental protection inspections, addressing climate change, supervising emissions reduction targets, supervising nuclear safety, as well as international environmental cooperation. It also has jurisdiction over China's nuclear safety agency.

MEE regulates water quality, ambient air quality, solid waste, soil, noise, radioactivity. In the area of R&D activities, MEE's predecessor MEP has funded a series of "Key Laboratories" in different parts of the country, including: Laboratory for Urban Air Particles Pollution Prevention and Control for Environmental Protection, Laboratory on Environment and Health, Laboratory on Industrial Ecology, Laboratory on Wetland Ecology and Vegetation Recovery, and Laboratory on Biosafety.

In addition, MEE also administers engineering and technical research centers related to environmental protection, including: Center for Non-ferrous Metal Industrial Pollution Control, Center for Clean Coal and Ecological Recovery of Mines, Center for Industrial Waste Water Pollution Control, Center for Industrial Flue Gas Control, Center for Hazardous Waste Treatment, and Center for Solid Waste Treatment and Disposal of Mines.

China is experiencing an increase in environmental complaints: In 2005, there were 51,000 disputes over environmental pollution, according to SEPA minister Zhou Shengxian. From 2001 to 2005, Chinese environmental authorities received more than 2.53 million letters and 430,000 visits by 597,000 petitioners seeking environmental redress.

== Organization ==
There are 12 offices and departments under MEE, all at the si (司) level in the government ranking system. They carry out regulatory tasks in different areas and make sure that the agency is functioning accordingly. The MEE is the administrative home of the ministerial-level Special Envoy for Climate Change Affairs, China's top envoy on international climate change negotiations. The Special Envoy is supported by the MEE's Office of Climate Change Affairs, headed by a vice minister.

=== Department structure ===
Department	Chinese Name
General Administrative Office	(办公厅)
Department of Human Resources & Institutional Affairs	(行政体制与人事司)
Department of Planning and Finance	(规划与财务司)
Department of Policies, Laws and Regulations	(政策法规司)
Department of Science & Technology and Standards	(科技标准司)
Pollution Control Office	(污染控制司)
Natural Ecosystem Protection Office	(自然生态保护司)
Department of Environmental Impact Assessment	(环境影响评价管理司)
International Cooperation Office	(国际合作司)
Department of Nuclear Safety	(核安全管理司)
Environmental Inspection Office	(环境监察局)
Office of Agency & Party Affairs	(机关党委)

=== Leadership ===
Position	Person Name
Minister of Ecology and Environment	Huang Runqiu
Vice Minister of Ecology and Environment	Sun Jinlong, Zhai Qing, Zhao Yingmin, Ye Min
Head of the Discipline Inspection & Supervision Group Dispatched From the CCDI & the NSC	Kurexi Maihesuti

=== Regional centers ===
In 2006, SEPA opened five regional centers to help with local inspections and enforcement. Today, the five centers are direct affiliates of MEE:

Region	Head Office	Enforcement Area
Eastern Center	Nanjing	Shanghai, Jiangsu, Zhejiang, Anhui, Fujian, Jiangxi, and Shandong.
Southern Center	Guangzhou	Hunan, Hubei, Guangdong, Guangxi, and Hainan.
Northwestern Center	Xi'an	Shaanxi, Gansu, Qinghai, Xinjiang, and Ningxia.
Southwestern Center	Chengdu	Chongqing, Sichuan, Guizhou, Yunnan, and Tibet.
Northeastern Center	Shenyang	Liaoning, Jining, and Heilongjiang.
MEE headquarters	Beijing	Beijing, Tianjing, Hebei, Henan, Shanxi, and Inner Mongolia.

== See also ==
- Ministry of Water Resources of the People's Republic of China
- Organic Food Development Center
- Environmental Protection Administration (Republic of China)
