= Politics of Shandong =

The composition of 13th People's Congress of Shandong Province: Chinese Communist Party (665) China Democratic League (18) Jiusan Society (17) China Association for Promoting Democracy (11) Revolutionary Committee of the Chinese Kuomintang (10) China Democratic National Construction Association (9) Chinese Peasants' and Workers' Democratic Party (7) China Zhi Gong Party (7) Independent (162)

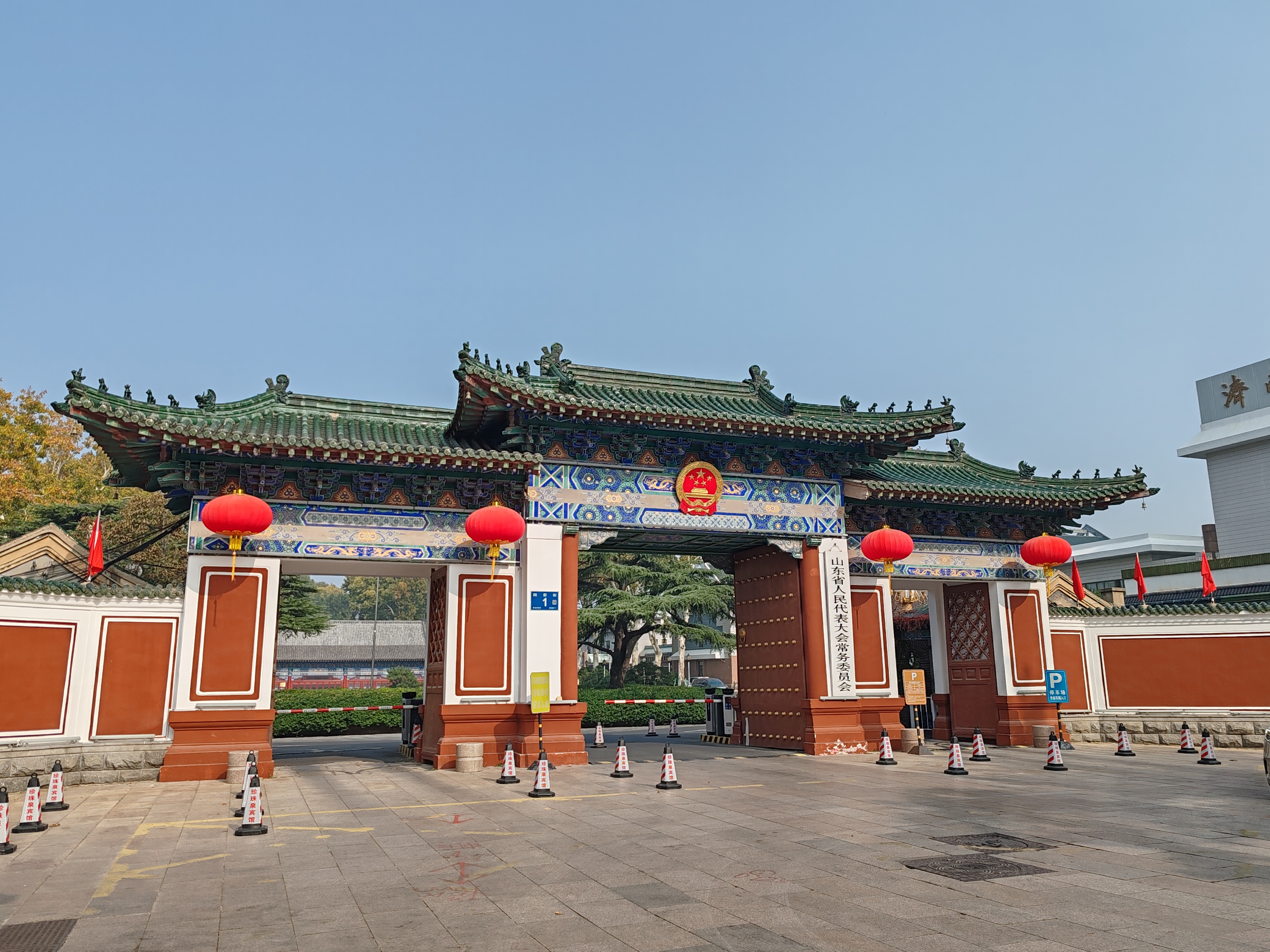
Entrance of Shandong Provincial People's Congress in Jinan; the People's Congress in China is equivalent to state council in Western countries. This site was also used as the Mansion of Governor of Shandong during the Ming Dynasty

The politics of Shandong in the People's Republic of China is structured in a dual party-government system like all other governing institutions in mainland China.

The Governor of Shandong is the highest-ranking official in the People's Government of Shandong. However, in the province's dual party-government governing system, the Governor has less power than the Party Secretary of Shandong, colloquially termed the "Shandong CCP Party Chief".

== List of the CCP Shandong Provincial Committee secretaries ==
No.	Image	Name	Term start	Term end	Ref.
1		Kang Sheng (1898–1975)	March 1949	December 1949	
–		Fu Qiutao (1907–1981)	December 1949	August 1950	
–		Xiang Ming (1909–1969)	August 1950	August 1954	
2		Shu Tong (1905–1998)	August 1954	October 1960	
3		Zeng Xisheng (1904–1968)	October 1960	March 1961	
4		Tan Qilong (1913–2003)	March 1961	February 1967	
5		Wang Xiaoyu (1914–1995)	February 1967	March 1971	
3		Yang Dezhi (1911–1994)	March 1971	November 1974	
4		Bai Rubing (1912–1994)	November 1974	December 1982	
5		Su Yiran (1918–2021)	December 1982	June 1985	
6		Liang Buting (1921–2021)	June 1985	December 1988	
7		Jiang Chunyun (1930–2021)	December 1988	October 1994	
8		Zhao Zhihao (born 1931)	October 1994	April 1997	
9		Wu Guanzheng (born 1938)	April 1997	November 2002	
10		Zhang Gaoli (born 1946)	23 November 2002	26 March 2007	
11		Li Jianguo (born 1946)	26 March 2007	31 March 2008	
12		Jiang Yikang (born 1953)	31 March 2008	1 April 2017	
13		Liu Jiayi (born 1956)	1 April 2017	30 September 2021	
14		Li Ganjie (born 1964)	30 September 2021	29 December 2022	
15		Lin Wu (born 1962)	29 December 2022	Incumbent	

== List of governors of Shandong ==
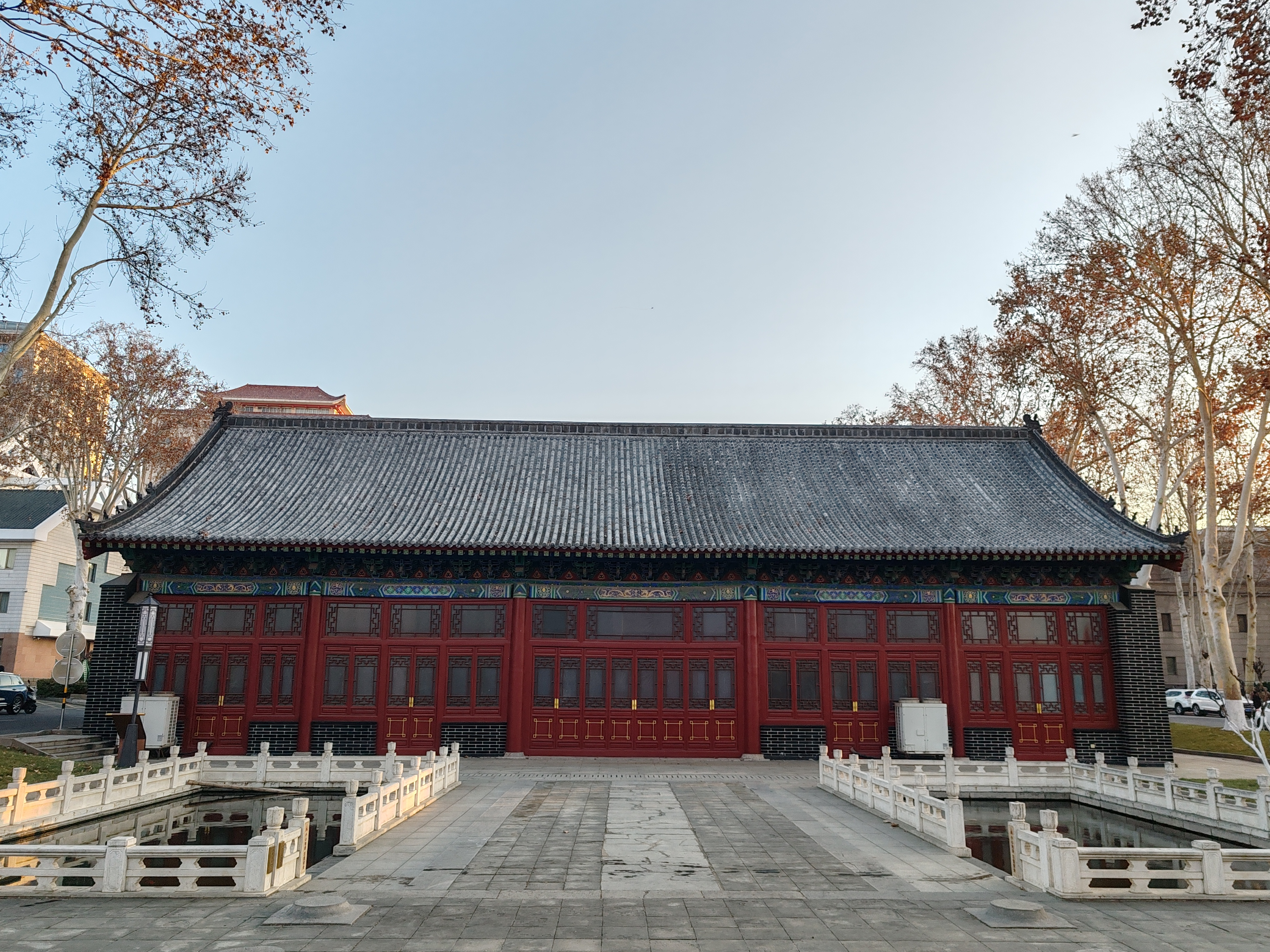
The former office of Governor of Shandong (xunfu) in Pearl Spring scenic area, Jinan

No.	Officeholder	Term of office		Party	Ref.
No.	Officeholder	Took office	Left office	Party	Ref.
Governor of the Shandong Provincial People's Government
1	Kang Sheng (1898–1975)	March 1949	March 1955	Chinese Communist Party	
Governor of the Shandong Provincial People's Committee
2	Zhao Jianmin (1912–2012)	March 1955	November 1958	Chinese Communist Party	
3	Tan Qilong (1913–2003)	November 1958	December 1963	Chinese Communist Party	
4	Bai Rubing (1912–1994)	February 1972	October 1975	Chinese Communist Party	
Director of the Shandong Revolutionary Committee
5	Wang Xiaoyu (1914–1995)	January 1967	November 1969	Chinese Communist Party	
6	Yang Dezhi (1911–1994)	March 1971	November 1974	Chinese Communist Party	
7	Bai Rubing (1912–1994)	November 1974	December 1979	Chinese Communist Party	
Governor of the Shandong Provincial People's Government
8	Su Yiran (1918–2021)	December 1979	December 1982	Chinese Communist Party	
9	Liang Buting (1921–2021)	December 1982	June 1985	Chinese Communist Party	
10	Li Changan (1935–2021)	June 1985	July 1987	Chinese Communist Party	
11	Jiang Chunyun (1930–2021)	July 1987	March 1989	Chinese Communist Party	
12	Zhao Zhihao (born 1931)	March 1989	February 1995	Chinese Communist Party	
13	Li Chunting (1936–2024)	February 1995	December 2001	Chinese Communist Party	
14	Zhang Gaoli (born 1946)	6 December 2001	13 January 2003	Chinese Communist Party	
15	Han Yuqun (born 1943)	13 January 2003	13 June 2007	Chinese Communist Party	
16	Jiang Daming (born 1953)	13 June 2007	16 March 2013	Chinese Communist Party	
17	Guo Shuqing (born 1956)	5 June 2013	24 February 2017	Chinese Communist Party	
18	Gong Zheng (born 1960)	11 April 2017	17 April 2020	Chinese Communist Party	
19	Li Ganjie (born 1964)	17 April 2020	30 September 2021	Chinese Communist Party	
20	Zhou Naixiang (born 1961)	30 September 2021	Incumbent	Chinese Communist Party	

== List of chairmen of Shandong Provincial People's Congress ==
1. Zhao Lin (赵林): 1979–1983
2. Qin Hezhen (秦和珍): 1983–1985
3. Li Zhen (李振): 1985–1996
4. Zhao Zhihao (赵志浩): 1996–2002
5. Han Xikai (韩喜凯): 2002–2003
6. Zhang Gaoli (张高丽): 2003–2007
7. Li Jianguo (李建国): 2007–2008
8. Jiang Yikang (姜异康): 2008–2017
9. Liu Jiayi (刘家义): 2017–2021
10. Li Ganjie (李干杰): 2021–present

== List of chairmen of the CPPCC Shandong Provincial Committee ==
1. Tan Qilong (谭启龙): 1955–1967
2. Bai Rubing (白如冰): 1977–1979
3. Gao Keting (高克亭): 1979–1983
4. Li Zichao (李子超): 1983–1993
5. Lu Maozeng (陆懋曾): 1993–1998
6. Han Xikai (韩喜凯): 1998–2002
7. Wu Aiying (吴爱英): 2002–2004
8. Sun Shuyi (孙淑义): 2004–2009
9. Liu Wei (刘伟): 2009–2018
10. Fu Zhifang (付志方): 2018–2022
11. Ge Huijun (葛慧君): 2022–present
