= Governor of Shandong =

Governor of the Shandong Provincial People's Government
- 山东省人民政府省长
- National Emblem of China

- Flag of China

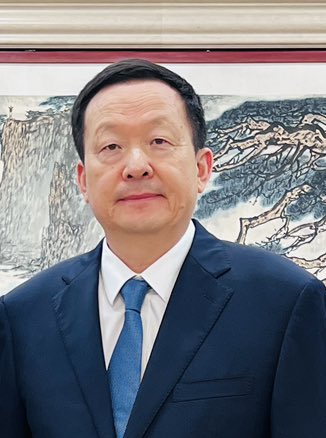
- Incumbent; Zhou Naixiang since 30 September 2021
- Shandong Provincial People's Government
- Type: Governor
- Status: Provincial and ministerial-level official
- Reports to: Shandong Provincial People's Congress and its Standing Committee
- Nominator: Presidium of the Shandong Provincial People's Congress
- Appointer: Shandong Provincial People's Congress
- Term length: Five years, renewable
- Inaugural holder: Kang Sheng
- Formation: March 1949
- Deputy: Deputy Governors; Secretary-General

The governor of Shandong, officially the Governor of the Shandong Provincial People's Government, is the head of the Shandong Provincial People's Government. The governor generally serves as the deputy secretary of the Shandong Provincial Committee of the Chinese Communist Party, and is the second highest-ranking official in the province after the secretary of the CCP Shandong Committee.

== List of governors ==
=== Ming dynasty (1368-1644) ===
Shandong within Ming China

In the first year of the Ming dynasty (1368), the Ming government established the province of Shandong (山東行中書省), formally designating Shandong as a province. In 1376, the capital was moved from Qingzhou to Jinan.

In 1440, the central Ming authority officially created the position of Governor (xunfu) of Shandong; the full title was Governor of Shandong and surrounding regions, responsible for Overseeing Military Agriculture, Managing Waterways, and Commanding Military Affairs (Chinese: 巡撫山東等處地方督理營田兼管河道提督軍務).

No.	Photo	Name	Appointed	Left office	Notes
1		Cao Hong 曹弘	1431	1435	
2		Li Yu 李郁	1435	1435	
3		Cao Hong 曹弘	1436	1439	
4		Zhang Ji 张骥	1445	1447	
5		Zhao Xin 赵新	1449	1449	
6		Hong Ying 洪英	1450	1452	
7		Xue Xilian 薛希琏	1452	1456	
8		Lin Cong 林聪	1457	1457	
9		Nian Fu 年富	1458	1460	
10		Jia Quan 贾铨	1460	1466	
30		Wang Xu 王珝	1518	1521	
31		Chen Fengwu 陈凤梧	1521	1523	
32		Wang Yaofeng 王尧封	1523	1529	
33		Jiang Yao 蒋瑶	1525	1525	
34		Liu Jie 刘节	1529	1530	
35		Shao Xi 邵锡	1530	1531	
36		Yuan Zongru 袁宗儒	1531	1533	
37		Tang Zhou 唐胄	1533	1534	
38		Guan Ji 管楫	1534	1535	
39		Cai Jing 蔡经	1535	1536	
40		Hu Zanzong 胡缵宗	1536	1538	
41		Cao Lan 曹兰	1538	1539	
42		Li Zhong 李中	1539	1541	
43		Zeng Xi 曾铣	1541	1544	
44		Duan Tingshe 端廷赦	1544	1545	
45		Lou Zhide 娄志德	1545	1546	
46		He Ao 何鳌	1546	1547	
47		Peng An 彭黯	1547	1548	
48		Luo Yong 骆颙	1548	1549	
49		Ying Jia 应槚	1549	1549	
50		Ying Dayou 应大猷	1549	1550	
51		Sun Shiyou 孙世祐	1550	1550	
52		Wang Ji 王积	1550	1551	
53		Wang Yu 王忬	1552	1552	
54		Shen Yinglong 沈应龙	1552	1554	
55		Liu Cai 刘采	1554	1557	
56		Fu Yi 傅颐	1557	1557	
57		Ding Yizhong 丁以中	1558	1560	
58		Zhu Heng 朱衡	1560	1561	
59		Xie Dongshan 谢东山	1561	1562	
60		Zhang Jian 张鉴	1563	1564	
61		Bao Xiangxian 鲍象贤	1564	1565	
62		Huo Ji 霍冀	1565	1566	
63		Weng Dali 翁大立	1566	1566	
64		Zhang Yunjì 张允济	1566	1597	
65		Hong Chaoxuan 洪朝选	1529	1567	
66		Jiang Tingyi 姜廷颐	1567	1570	
67		Liang Menglong 梁梦龙	1570	1571	
68		Fu Xizhi 傅希挚	1571	1574	
69		Li Shida 李世达	1574	1577	
70		Zhao Xian 赵贤	1577	1579	
71		He Qiming 何起鸣	1579	1581	
72		Yang Junmin 杨俊民	1581	1581	
73		Lu Shude 陆树德	1581	1583	
74		Li Fu 李辅	1583	1586	
75		Li Dai 李戴	1586	1589	
76		Song Yingchang 宋应昌	1589	1592	
77		Sun Kuang 孙鑛	1592	1593	
78		Zheng Rubi 郑汝璧	1593	1595	
79		Zhang Yunjì 张允济	1595	1597	
80		Yin Yingyuan 尹应元	1597	1599	
81		Liu Yicong 刘易从	1599	1600	
82		Huang Kezuan 黄克缵	1601	1612	
83		Li Tongfang 李同芳	1612	1614	
84		Qian Shiwang 钱士完	1614	1616	
85		Li Changgang 李長庚	1616	1619	
86		Wang Zaijin 王在晋	1619	1620	
87		Zhao Yan 趙彥	1620	1623	
88		Wang Weijian 王惟俭	1623	1625	
89		Lu Chunru 吕纯如	1625	1626	
90		Li Jingbai 李精白	1626	1627	
91		Wang Congyi 王从义	1628	1630	
92		Shen Xun 沈珣	1630	1630	
93		Yu Dacheng 余大成	1631	1632	
94		Xu Congzhi 徐从治	1632	1632	
95		Zhu Datian 朱大典	1632	1634	
96		Li Maofang 李懋芳	1634	1636	
97		Yan Jizu 颜继祖	1636	1639	
98		Liu Jingyao 刘景曜	1639	1639	
99		Wang Guobin 王國賓	1639	1641	
100		Wang Gongbi 王公弼	1641	1641	
101		Wang Yongji 王永吉	1642	1642	
102		Qiu Zude 邱祖德	1642	1644	
103		Wang Gongbi 王公璧	1644	1644	

=== Qing dynasty (1644-1912) ===
Flag of Qing Dynasty

Shandong within Qing China

After Jurchen people took power, they reestablished the office of the Provincial Governor of Shandong, formally titled Governor of Shandong and surrounding regions, Commander of Military Affairs and Provisions, concurrently overseeing Agricultural Affairs (Chinese: 巡撫山東等處地方提督軍務, 糧饟兼理營田) The governor was stationed in Jinan and held the official rank of Senior Second Rank (正二品). In 1714, the governor additionally took on the supervision of Linqing Customs; in 1743, he was granted the honorary title of Commander General (Chinese: 提督), and in 1837, the governor assumed responsibility for Shandong's salt administration. Due to these additional duties, the actual status of the Shandong Governor in the Qing dynasty rose to Sub-First Rank (從一品), making him the highest-ranking regional official overseeing both civil and military affairs on behalf of the imperial court. The governor's administrative office, known as the Xunfu Yamen (巡撫衙門), which also referred to as the Department of the Provincial Governor (巡抚部院署) or Office of the Provincial Governor (巡抚院署), was the highest executive institution of the province, located within the Pearl Spring compound in Jinan.

No.	Photo	Name	Appointed	Left office	Notes
1		Fang Dayou 方大猷	1644	1645	
2		Ding Wensheng 丁文盛	1645	1647	
3		Zhang Ruxiu 張儒秀	1647	1648	
4		Lü Fengchun 呂逢春	1648	1649	
5		Xia Yu 夏玉	1649	1654	
6		Geng Tun 耿焞	1654	1658	
7		Xu Wenxiu 許文秀	1659	1661	
8		Jiang Guozhu 蔣國柱	1661	1663	
9		Zhou Youde 周有德	1663	1667	
10		Liu Fangshu 劉芳躅	1668	1670	
11		Yuan Maogong 袁懋功	1670	1671	
12		Zhang Fengyi 張鳳儀	1671	1673	
13		Zhao Xiangxing 趙祥星	1673	1679	
14		Shi Weihan 施維翰	1679	1683	
15		Li Tianyu 李天浴	1683	1683	
16		Xu Xuling 徐旭齡	1683	1684	
17		Zhang Peng 張鵬	1684	1686	
18		Lang Yongqing 郎永清	1686	1687	
19		Qian Jue 錢珏	1687	1689	
20		Fulen 佛倫	1689	1692	
21		Sang'e 桑額	1692	1695	
22		Yang Tingyao 楊廷耀	1695	1696	
23		Li Wei 李煒	1696	1698	
24		Li Bing 李鈵	1698	1698	
25		Wang Guochang 王國昌	1698	1704	
26		Zhao Shixian 趙世顯	1704	1708	
27		Jiang Chenxi 蔣陳錫	1708	1716	
28		Li Shude 李樹德	1716	1722	
29		Xie Cilu 謝賜履	1722	1722	
30		Huang Bing 黃炳	1722	1724	
31		Chen Shiguan 陳世倌	1724	1726	
32		Seleng'e 塞楞額	1726	1728	
33		Yue Jun 岳濬	1728	1736	
34		Famin 法敏	1736	1739	
35		Shuose 碩色	1739	1740	
36		Zhu Dingyuan 朱定元	1740	1742	
37		Yan Sisheng 晏斯盛	1742	1743	
38		Kaqishan 喀爾吉善	1743	1746	
39		Seleng'e 塞楞額	1746	1746	
40		Arigūn 阿里袞	1746	1748	
41		Zhuntai 準泰	1748	1751	Zhaohui acting
42		Oyonggo 鄂容安	1751	1752	
43		Yang Yingju 楊應琚	1752	1754	
44		Guo Yiyu 郭一裕	1754	1755	Bai Zhongshan acting
45		E Leshun 鄂樂舜	1755	1756	
46		Aibida 愛必達	1756	1755	
47		Henian 鶴年	1755	1756	
48		Jiang Zhou 蔣洲	1756	1756	Henian concurrent; Altai acting
49		Altai 阿爾泰	1756	1763	
50		Cui Yingjie 崔應階	1763	1767	
51		Li Qingshi 李清時	1767	1768	
52		Zhang Bao 彰寶	1768	1768	
53		Funihan 富尼漢	1768	1768	
54		Fuming'an 富明安	1768	1771	
55		Zhou Yuanli 周元理	1771	1771	
56		Xu Ji 徐績	1771	1774	
57		Yang Jingsu 楊景素	1774	1777	
58		Hao Shuo 郝碩	1777	1777	
59		Guotai 國泰	1777	1782	Nomuqin acting
60		Mingxing 明興	1782	1787	
61		Changlin 長麟	1787	1790	Hu Jitang administering
62		Huiling 惠齡	1790	1791	Jiang Lan administering
63		Jiqing 吉慶	1791	1793	
64		Huiling 惠齡	1793	1793	
65		Funing 福寧	1793	1794	
66		Muholan 穆和蘭	1794	1794	
67		Bi Yuan 畢沅	1794	1795	
68		Yude 玉德	1795	1796	
69		Yijiang'a 伊江阿	1796	1799	Yixing acting
70		Chen Dawen 陳大文	1799	1800	
71		Jiang Zhaokui 蔣兆奎	1800	1800	
72		Huiling 惠齡	1800	1801	
73		Henning 和寧	1801	1802	
74		Zu Zhiwang 祖之望	1802	1802	
75		Woshibu 倭什布	1802	1803	
76		Tiebao 鐵保	1803	1805	
77		Quanbao 全保	1805	1805	Acting
78		Changling 長齡	1805	1807	
79		Jilun 吉綸	1807	1808	
80		Bailing 百齡	1808	1809	
81		Jilun 吉綸	1809	1811	
82		Tongxing 同興	1811	1814	Zhang Xu acting
83		Chen Yu 陳預	1814	1818	
84		Heshunwu 和舜武	1818	1819	
85		Cheng Guoren 程國仁	1819	1820	
86		Qian Zhen 錢臻	1820	1821	
87		Qishan 琦善	1821	1822	Yang Jian administering
88		Cheng Hanzhang 程含章	1822	1823	
89		Qishan 琦善	1823	1824	
90		Ne'erjing'e 訥爾經額	1824	—	Acting
91		Qishan 琦善	1825	1825	
92		Yilibu 伊里布	1825	1825	
93		Ne'erjing'e 訥爾經額	—	—	Acting
94		Wulong'a 武隆阿	1825	1826	
95		Chen Zhongfu 陳中孚	1826	1826	Acting
96		Cheng Hanzhang 程含章	1826	1827	
97		He Changling 賀長齡	1827	—	
98		Lu Kun 盧坤	1827	1827	
99		Qishan 琦善	1827	1829	
100		Ne'erjing'e 訥爾經額	1829	1832	
101		Zhong Xiang 鍾祥	1832	1836	
102		Jing'ebulu 經額布	1836	1839	
103		Tuohunbu 托渾布	1839	1842	
104		Cheng Yucai 程矞采	1842	1842	Not in office
105		Liang Baochang 梁寶常	1842	1843	Linkui, Wang Du acting
106		Chongen 崇恩	1843	1847	
107		Zhang Lizhong 張澧中	1847	1848	
108		Xu Zechun 徐澤醇	1848	1849	
109		Chen Qingxie 陳慶偕	1849	1852	Liu Yuanhao, Chen Qingxie acting
110		Li Pi 李僡	1852	1853	
111		Zhang Liangji 張亮基	1853	1854	
112		Chongen 崇恩	1854	1859	
113		Wen Yu 文煜	1859	1861	
114		Tan Tingxiang 譚廷襄	1861	1862	Yan Jingming acting
115		Yan Jingming 閻敬銘	1863	1867	
116		Ding Baozhen 丁寶楨	1867	1876	Wen Bin acting
117		Wenge 文格	1876	1879	
118		Zhou Hengqi 周恒祺	1879	1881	
119		Ren Daorong 任道鎔	1881	1883	
120		Chen Shijie 陳士杰	1883	1886	
121		Zhang Yao 張曜	1886	1891	
122		Furun 福潤	1891	1894	
123		Li Bingheng 李秉衡	1894	1897	Resigned due to Juye Incident; later committed suicide in Boxer Rebellion
124		Zhang Rumei 張汝梅	1897	1899	
125		Yuxian 毓賢	1899	1900	Executed in Boxer Rebellion
126		Yuan Shikai 袁世凱	1900	1901	Filial mourning leave mid-1901; later became the President of ROC and Hongxian Emperor
127		Zhang Renjun 張人駿	1901	1902	
128		Zhou Fu 周馥	1902	1904	
129		Yang Shixiang 楊士驤	1904	1907	
130		Wu Tingbin 吳廷斌	1907	1908	Yuan Dahua acting
131		Yuan Shuxun 袁樹勛	1908	1909	
132		Sun Baoqi 孫寶琦	1909	1911	Declared the independence of Shandong from Qing court during the 1911 Revolution, but later withdrew the claim under the pressure. Resigned from the job on December 17, 1911.
133		Hu Jianshu 胡建樞	1911	1912	Acting
134		Zhang Guangjian 張廣建	1912	—	Nominated by Yuan Shikai.

=== Republic of China (1912-49) ===
==== Beiyang Government (1912-27) ====
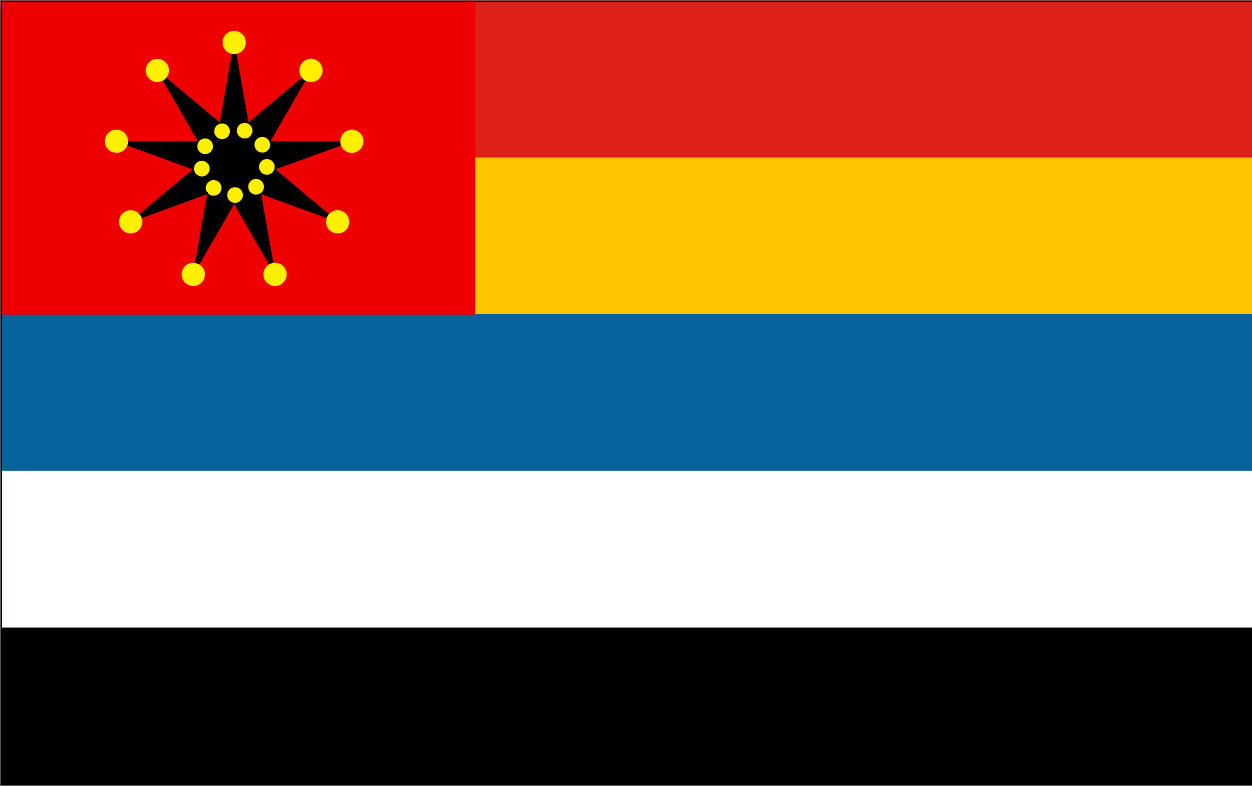
Shandong Military Government Flag

Shandong within Republic of China

Qing regime was overthrown in 1911, yet Southern revolutionaries were not able to take full control of the country, a vast part of it were still governed by old military leaders, which is known as Beiyang warlords. During the Beiyang era (1912–1928), the Governor of Shandong Province held broad authority over civil administration, finance, education, and public security, and often exercised military power, especially when concurrently serving as military governor or commander-in-chief. Given Shandong's strategic importance and proximity to the Beiyang Government's power base, the position of governor was typically filled by prominent figures affiliated with major warlord factions—namely the Anhui, Zhili, and Fengtian cliques.

Governorships were unstable and frequently changed hands, reflecting the intense factional struggles and shifting alliances in the warlord-dominated central government. Notable governors during this period included Jin Yunpeng, who later became Premier, as well as Zhang Jingyao and Gao Heng, all of whom represented competing warlord interests.

No.	Officeholder	Term of office		Party	Ref.
No.	Officeholder	Took office	Left office	Party	Ref.
1	Hu Ying	February 1912	March 1912	Kuomintang	
2	Zhang Guangjian	March 1912	March 1912		
3	Zhou Ziqi	March 1912	August 1913		
4	Jin Yunpeng	August 1913	May 1916		
5	Zhang Huaizhi	May 1916	June 1918		
6	Zhang Shuyuan 張樹元	June 1918	December 1919		
7	Tian Zhongyu 田中玉	December 1919	October 1923		
8	Zheng Shiqi	October 1923	April 1925		
9	Zhang Zongchang	April 1925	June 1928		

==== Nationalist Government of Nanjing (1927-49) ====
Flag of Republic of China

Shandong within Republic of China

The North Expedition successfully defeated Beiyang warlords and united China under a single government from Nanjing. During the Nationalist Government era (1928–1937, 1945–1949), the Governor of Shandong Province was appointed by the central government of the Republic of China under the Kuomintang (KMT). The governor functioned as the highest administrative authority in the province, overseeing civil governance, public security, taxation, education, and—in some cases—military affairs, particularly during times of war and political instability.

Han Fuju, the governor of Shandong from 1930 to 1938, was executed by Chiang Kai-shek due to his inaction during the early stage of the Second Sino-Japanese War, which led to the loss of Shandong to Japan. During the war, this job was mostly titular as Japanese occupied most part of the province, and governors like Shen, Mou, and Xue were not physically present in Shandong.

After the End of World War II, the Nationalist Government reassigned governors. The second to last governor, general Wang Yaowu, was captured as prisoner by communist troops after they took Jinan. Then Qin Dechun was appointed, but he never assumed office until March 1945, when he went to Qingdao and took the oath. Nive days later, Qin fled to Guangzhou then Taiwan, marking the end of the Republic of China's rule in Shandong. The nationalist Province of Shandong was fully abolished on August 15, 1949.

No.	Officeholder	Term of office		Party	Ref.
No.	Officeholder	Took office	Left office	Party	Ref.
1	Sun Liangcheng 孫良誠	May 1928	April 1929	Kuomintang	
–	Shi Jinting 石敬亭	May 1928	October 1928	Kuomintang	
–	Lü Xiuwen 呂秀文	Acting		Kuomintang	
–	Chen Diaoyuan 陳調元	Acting		Kuomintang	
2	Chen Diaoyuan	May 1929	September 1930	Kuomintang	
3	Han Fuju	September 1930	January 1938	Kuomintang	
4	Shen Honglie 沈鴻烈	January 1938	27 December 1941	Kuomintang	
5	Mou Zhongxing 牟中珩	January 1942	December 1944	Kuomintang	
6	Xue Yue	December 1944	January 1945	Kuomintang	
7	He Siyuan	January 1945	November 1946	Kuomintang	
8	Wang Yaowu	November 1946	November 1948	Kuomintang	
9	Qin Dechun	November 1948	March 1949	Kuomintang	

==== Provisional Government of the Republic of China (1937–1940) ====
Flag of Provisional Government of ROC

Provisional Government of ROC (lightgreen)

At the outbreak of the Second Sino-Japanese War in 1937, following the Japanese army's capture of Nanjing, a Provisional Government of the Republic of China was established in Beijing under Japanese occupation. Ma Liang joined the regime as a committee member. In 1938, he was appointed Governor of Shandong Province and concurrently served as Commander-in-Chief of Provincial Security Forces.

In January 1939, Tang Yangdu was appointed as Governor of Shandong; during his tenure, he was responsible for strengthening internal security and suppressing rebellion activities within the province.

No.	Officeholder	Term of office		Party	Ref.
No.	Officeholder	Took office	Left office	Party	Ref.
Governor of the Shandong Provincial Government (山東省公署省長)
1	Ma Liang 馬良	March 1938	January 1939		
2	Tang Yangdu 唐仰杜	January 1939	March 1940		

==== Wang Jingwei Regime (1940–1945) ====
In March 1940, the Provisional Government merged with Wang Jingwei's Reorganized National Government based in Nanjing. Tang Yangdu continued to serve as Governor of Shandong under the new regime. This position was abolished after Japanese got defeated; Tang Yangdu and Yang Yuxun were executed because of treason, and Ma Liang died in a prison in Jinan.

No.	Officeholder	Term of office		Party	Ref.
No.	Officeholder	Took office	Left office	Party	Ref.
Governor of the Shandong Provincial Government (山東省政府省長)
1	Tang Yangdu 唐仰杜	March 1940	March 1945		
2	Yang Yuxun 楊毓珣	March 1945	Sept 1945		

=== People's Republic of China (1949-) ===
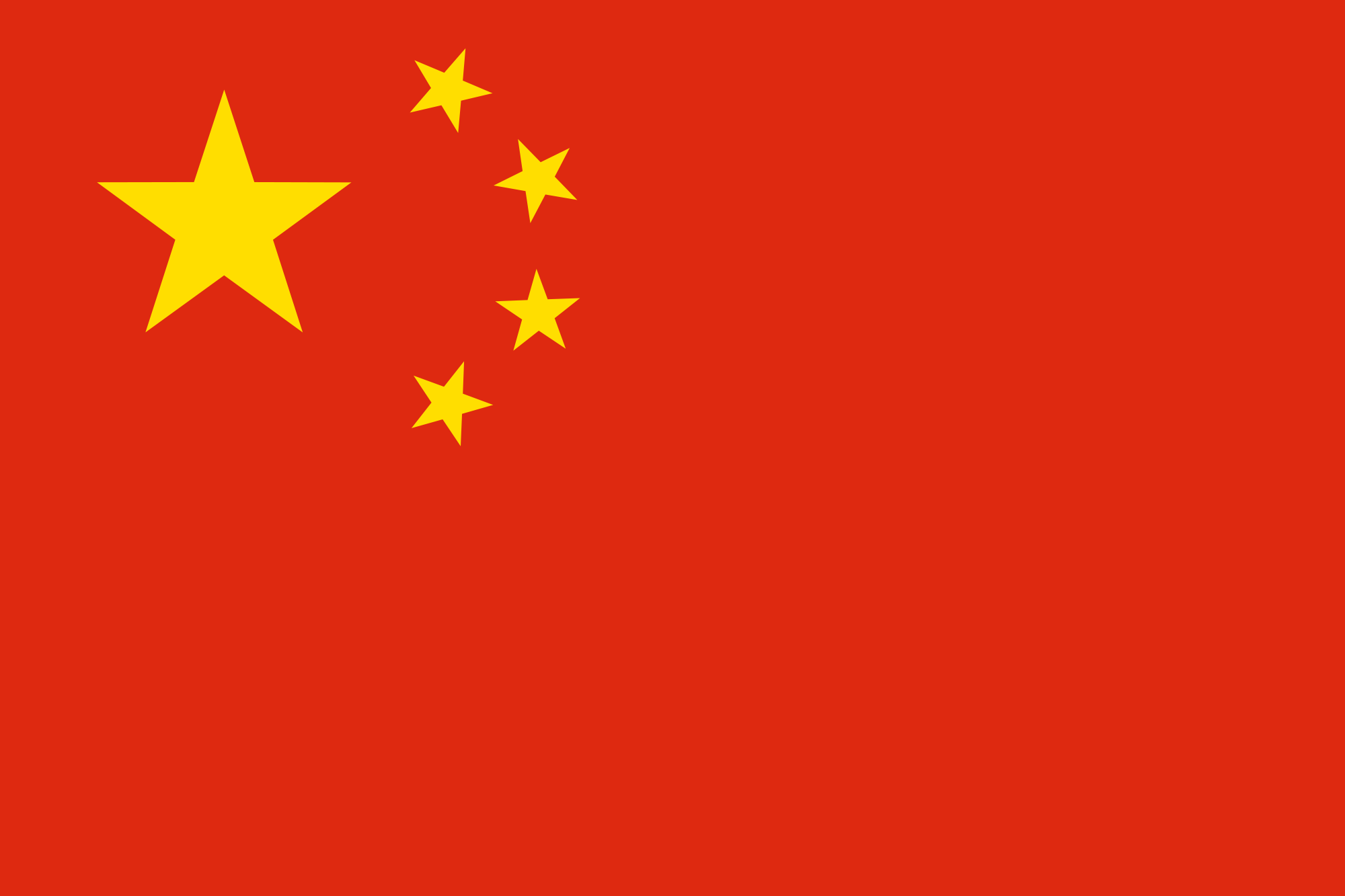
Flag of People's Republic of China

Shandong within People's Republic of China

Governor of Shandong under the People's Republic of China was established during the Chinese Civil War. The first governor was Kang Sheng, a high-ranking communist and native from Zhucheng, Shandong. Now the Governor of Shandong is the head of the Shandong Provincial People's Government. The governor generally serves as the deputy secretary of the Shandong Provincial Committee of the Chinese Communist Party, and is the second highest-ranking official in the province after the secretary of the CCP Shandong Committee.

No.	Officeholder	Term of office		Party	Ref.
No.	Officeholder	Took office	Left office	Party	Ref.
Governor of the Shandong Provincial People's Government
1	Kang Sheng (1898–1975)	March 1949	March 1955	Chinese Communist Party	
Governor of the Shandong Provincial People's Committee
2	Zhao Jianmin (1912–2012)	March 1955	November 1958	Chinese Communist Party	
3	Tan Qilong (1913–2003)	November 1958	December 1963	Chinese Communist Party	
4	Bai Rubing (1912–1994)	February 1972	October 1975	Chinese Communist Party	
Director of the Shandong Revolutionary Committee
5	Wang Xiaoyu (1914–1995)	January 1967	November 1969	Chinese Communist Party	
6	Yang Dezhi (1911–1994)	March 1971	November 1974	Chinese Communist Party	
7	Bai Rubing (1912–1994)	November 1974	December 1979	Chinese Communist Party	
Governor of the Shandong Provincial People's Government
8	Su Yiran (1918–2021)	December 1979	December 1982	Chinese Communist Party	
9	Liang Buting (1921–2021)	December 1982	June 1985	Chinese Communist Party	
10	Li Changan (1935–2021)	June 1985	July 1987	Chinese Communist Party	
11	Jiang Chunyun (1930–2021)	July 1987	March 1989	Chinese Communist Party	
12	Zhao Zhihao (born 1931)	March 1989	February 1995	Chinese Communist Party	
13	Li Chunting (1936–2024)	February 1995	December 2001	Chinese Communist Party	
14	Zhang Gaoli (born 1946)	6 December 2001	13 January 2003	Chinese Communist Party	
15	Han Yuqun (born 1943)	13 January 2003	13 June 2007	Chinese Communist Party	
16	Jiang Daming (born 1953)	13 June 2007	16 March 2013	Chinese Communist Party	
17	Guo Shuqing (born 1956)	5 June 2013	24 February 2017	Chinese Communist Party	
18	Gong Zheng (born 1960)	11 April 2017	17 April 2020	Chinese Communist Party	
19	Li Ganjie (born 1964)	17 April 2020	30 September 2021	Chinese Communist Party	
20	Zhou Naixiang (born 1961)	30 September 2021	Incumbent	Chinese Communist Party	

== See also ==
- Politics of Shandong
