= Shandong Provincial People's Government =

Provincial government in China

Shandong Provincial People's Government 山东省人民政府
- Established: December 1949; 76 years ago

Leadership
- Governor: Zhou Naixiang; 30 September 2021
- Parent body: Central People's Government; Shandong Provincial People's Congress
- Elected by: Shandong Provincial People's Congress

Website
- www.sd.gov.cn

The Shandong Provincial People's Government is the local administrative agency of Shandong. It is officially elected by the Shandong Provincial People's Congress and is formally responsible to the Shandong Provincial People's Congress and its Standing Committee. Under the country's one-party system, the governor is subordinate to the secretary of the Shandong Provincial Committee of the Chinese Communist Party. The Provincial government is headed by a governor, currently Zhou Naixiang.

== History ==
On August 17, 1940, the CCP Central Committee decided to establish the Shandong Provincial Wartime Work Promotion Committee. In August 1943, it was renamed the Shandong Provincial Wartime Administrative Committee. In August 1945, the administration of Shandong Province was transferred to the CCP Shandong Provincial Government.

In December 1949, the Shandong Provincial People's Government was formally established. In March 1955, it was renamed the Shandong Provincial People's Committee. In March 1967, the Shandong Provincial Revolutionary Committee was established. In December 1979, the Shandong Provincial Revolutionary Committee was abolished and the Shandong Provincial People's Government was re-established.

== Organization ==
The organization of the Shandong Provincial People's Government includes:

- General Office of the Shandong Provincial People's Government

=== Component Departments ===
- Shandong Provincial Development and Reform Commission
- Shandong Provincial Department of Education
- Shandong Provincial Department of Science and Technology
- Shandong Provincial Department of Industry and Information Technology
- Shandong Provincial Ethnic and Religious Affairs Committee
- Shandong Provincial Public Security Department
- Shandong Provincial Department of Civil Affairs
- Shandong Provincial Department of Justice
- Shandong Provincial Department of Finance
- Shandong Provincial Department of Human Resources and Social Security
- Shandong Provincial Department of Natural Resources
- Shandong Provincial Department of Ecology and Environment
- Shandong Provincial Department of Housing and Urban-Rural Development
- Shandong Provincial Department of Transportation
- Shandong Provincial Water Resources Department
- Shandong Provincial Department of Agriculture and Rural Affairs
- Shandong Provincial Department of Commerce
- Shandong Provincial Department of Culture and Tourism
- Shandong Provincial Health Commission
- Shandong Provincial Department of Veterans Affairs
- Shandong Provincial Emergency Management Department
- Shandong Provincial Audit Office
- Foreign Affairs Office of Shandong Provincial People's Government

=== Directly affiliated special institution ===
- State-owned Assets Supervision and Administration Commission of Shandong Provincial People's Government

=== Organizations under the government ===
- Shandong Provincial Administration for Market Regulation
- Shandong Provincial Radio and Television Bureau
- Shandong Provincial Sports Bureau
- Shandong Provincial Bureau of Statistics
- Shandong Provincial Medical Insurance Bureau
- Shandong Provincial Government Affairs Bureau
- Shandong Provincial National Defense Mobilization Office
- Research Office of Shandong Provincial People's Government
- Shandong Provincial Big Data Bureau

=== Directly affiliated institutions ===
- Qilu University of Technology
- Shandong Academy of Social Sciences
- Shandong First Medical University
- Shandong Coalfield Geology Bureau
- Nishan World Confucianism Center
- China Council for the Promotion of International Trade Shandong Provincial Committee
- Shandong Engineering Consulting Institute
- Shandong Radio and Television
- Shandong Federation of Supply and Marketing Cooperatives
- Shandong Light Industry Collective Enterprises Federation
- Shandong Public Resources Trading Center
- Shandong Provincial People's Government Office in Beijing

=== Departmental management organization ===
- The Shandong Provincial Bureau of Letters and Calls is managed by the General Office of the Provincial Government.
- The Shandong Provincial Energy Bureau is managed by the Provincial Development and Reform Commission.
- The Shandong Provincial Bureau of Grain and Material Reserves is managed by the Provincial Development and Reform Commission.
- The Shandong Provincial Prison Administration Bureau is managed by the Provincial Department of Justice.
- The Shandong Provincial Oceanic Administration is managed by the Provincial Department of Natural Resources.
- The Shandong Provincial Animal Husbandry and Veterinary Bureau is managed by the Provincial Department of Agriculture and Rural Affairs.
- The Shandong Provincial Marine and Fisheries Law Enforcement and Supervision Bureau is managed by the Provincial Department of Agriculture and Rural Affairs.
- The Shandong Provincial Drug Administration is managed by the Provincial Market Supervision Bureau.

=== Agency ===
- Jinan New and Old Kinetic Energy Conversion Starting Area Management Committee

== Leadership ==
Name	Office	Party	Ref.
Zhao Long	Governor Secretary of the Provincial Government Party Leading Group	CCP	
Zhang Haibo	Executive Deputy Governor Deputy Secretary of the Party Leading Group	CCP	
Song Junji	Deputy Governor Member of the Party Leading Group	CCP	
Chen Ping	Deputy Governor Member of the Party Leading Group	CCP	
Li Wei	Deputy Governor Member of the Party Leading Group	CCP	
Wang Guiying	Deputy Governor	CZGP	
Wen Nuan	Deputy Governor Member of the Party Leading Group	CCP	
Sun Ximin	Deputy Governor Member of the Party Leading Group	CCP	
Xu Wen	Secretary-General Member of the Party Leading Group	CCP	

== See also ==
- Politics of Shandong
  - Shandong Provincial People's Congress
  - Shandong Provincial People's Government
    - Governor of Shandong
  - Shandong Provincial Committee of the Chinese Communist Party
    - Party Secretary of Shandong
  - Shandong Provincial Committee of the Chinese People's Political Consultative Conference
