= Hu Ying =

Hu Ying may refer to:

- Hu Ying (revolutionary) (1884–1933), revolutionary in the Republic of China
- Hu Ying (chemist) (1934–2023), Chinese physical chemist
