= Li Bingheng =

Qing military figure and statesman

Li Bingheng 李秉衡
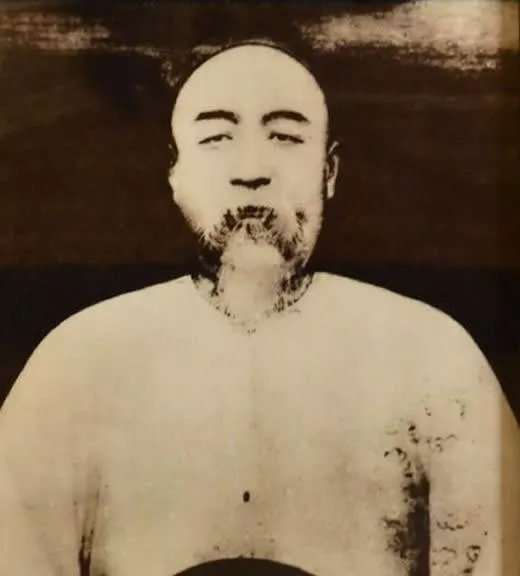

Governor of Shandong
- In office 16 August – 27 September 1894
- Monarch: Guangxu
- Preceded by: Furun
- Succeeded by: Zhang Rumei

Governor of Anhui
- In office 25 May – 16 August 1894
- Preceded by: Shen Bingcheng
- Succeeded by: Furun

Personal details
- Born: 1830 Zhuanghe, Liaoning, China
- Died: 1900 (aged 69–70) Tongzhou, Beijing, China

Military service
- Allegiance: China
- Branch: Imperial Chinese Army
- Years of service: 1879 – 1900
- Commands: Huai Army
- Battles/wars: Sino-French War: Battle of Zhennan Pass; First Sino-Japanese War; Boxer Rebellion: Battle of Peking †

Li Bingheng (Chinese: 李秉衡, 1830–1900), courtesy name Jiantang (鑑堂), was a Chinese military figure and statesman who served as the Governor of Anhui and the Governor of Shandong and a veteran of the Sino-French War, the First Sino-Japanese War and served in the Boxer Rebellion before committing suicide at the Battle of Peking.

== Biography ==
=== Early military career ===
In the early years, he became the county magistrate and moved to the county. In 1879, he became the Jizhou prefecture magistrate. In 1881, he was promoted to the prefect of Yongping. Ten years later (1884), he served as the inspector of Guangxi.

During the Sino-French War, Bingheng presided over the Longzhou Western Transport Bureau. The next year and Feng Zicai would fight and win at the Battle of Zhennan Pass. Peng Yulin would describe them as:

The two ministers are loyal and upright, both win the hearts and minds of the people, and they share the greatest merit.

In May 1894, he served as governor of Anhui.

=== First Sino-Japanese War ===
After the First Sino-Japanese War broke out, the Qing court appointed Li Bingheng as the Governor of Shandong.

At that time, Yanxi, Li Shaofen, etc., among the chiefs of the Ministry of Personnel's Selected Works, reported that the generals who were able to fight at that time were Liu Yongfu and others along with veterans who could serve in the Huai Army are Zhang Zhidong, Li Bingheng, and Tang Jingsong, all of whom share the same hatred and reputation. It was suggested that the Manchu Qing court trusted them and settled that they would be effective and meritorious and there were any defeat from any of them, immediately rectify the Fa in front of the army under no exceptions. On May 2, 1895, Henan Juren Bu Xiangzao reported that the Huai Army generals had deducted their wages, and when they heard the Imperial Japanese Army approaching, they fled and disbanded on their own. Its defeat is a crime of non-war. Song Qing's army, supported by thousands of soldiers for half a year, were able to defend and fight, but failed to win as it was alone and without reinforcements. Li Bingheng and Liu Yongfu also had the heart to fight to the death. However, Li Bingheng was quite lacking in the use of troops in Shandong. The Imperial Japanese Navy sent three ships to view Dengzhou, Bingheng gathered all his elite troops in the northwest, and Rongcheng was captured by the Japanese Army.

=== Juye Incident and the Boxer Rebellion ===
In 1897, Germany sent troops into Jiaozhou Bay because of the Juye Incident. Li Bingheng, the governor of Shandong at the time, believed that "the land cannot be lost by oneself" and sent troops to fight against them. Li was then made Governor-General, but was ousted under German pressure before taking office. In 1900, he served as the minister of the Yangtze River navy. After the Eight-Power Alliance attacked the Taku Forts, Li Bingheng was offered to join with the Mutual Defense Pact of the Southeastern Provinces proposed by Zhang Zhidong and Liu Kun, but then Li urged to recruit troops to guard the capital, and tried his best to fight when the Empress Dowager Cixi summoned him and so he led the four armies to fight. Li would also remark regarding the Boxer rebellion that, "[he had] seen several tens of thousands of troops jamming all roads. They fled as soon as they heard of the arrival of the enemy...[he had] experienced many wars, but never saw things like these." He was defeated in Yangcun and retreated to Tongzhou where he committed suicide by swallowing gold. At the beginning of the posthumous loyalty festival, the coalition forces listed Li Bingheng as the culprit of the incident and demanded severe punishment but the Qing government decided that Bingheng died first and wasn't punished, but ordered the pursuit of all official positions and the revocation of the sympathy code.

=== Legacy ===
Due to the lack of documentation, there aren't many academic articles on him. Scholars however affirmed his language, stating that he was clean and honest throughout his life, loyal to the monarch and the country, diligent in government and loving the people. Some descendants lived in what is now Dalian and a memorial hall after him is located there.

The reformist Wu Qiao however, criticized Bingheng stating he was: ".....very bad about foreign affairs, and everything in China is wrong with such a decent person."

The Record of Changes in the Country of Gengzi, written by Luo Dunrong, pointed out that the deaths of Xu Jingcheng and Yuan Chang, who were named the five ministers who were blamed on Gengzi, were related to Li Bingheng. "On the fourth day of the seventh lunar month, Xu Jingcheng and Yuan Chang were killed with Injustice."
