= Zhao Zhihao =

Chinese politician

- 赵志浩

Party Secretary of Shandong
- In office October 1994 – April 1997
- Preceded by: Jiang Chunyun
- Succeeded by: Wu Guanzheng

Chairman of Shandong Provincial People's Congress
- In office March 1996 – 2002
- Preceded by: Li Zhen
- Succeeded by: Han Xikai

Governor of Shandong
- In office March 1989 – February 1995
- Preceded by: Jiang Chunyun
- Succeeded by: Li Chunting

Personal details
- Born: 20 November 1931 (age 94) Huang County, Shandong, China
- Party: Chinese Communist Party

Chinese name
- Simplified Chinese: 赵志浩
- Traditional Chinese: 趙志浩
Transcriptions
Standard Mandarin
- Hanyu Pinyin: Zhào Zhìhào

Zhao Zhihao (Chinese: 赵志浩; born 20 November 1931) is a Chinese politician who served as governor of Shandong from 1989 to 1995, party secretary of Shandong from 1994 to 1997, and chairman of Shandong Provincial People's Congress from 1996 to 2002.

He was a representative of the 13th, 14th, 15th, 16th, 17th, 18th, and 19th National Congress of the Chinese Communist Party. He was a delegate to the 7th and 8th National People's Congress. He was a member of the 14th Central Committee of the Chinese Communist Party.

== Biography ==
Zhao was born in Huang County (now Longkou), Shandong, on 20 November 1931. He joined the Chinese Communist Party (CCP) in January 1947.

Beginning in 1958, he served in several posts in Teng County (now Tengzhou), including president of Teng County No. 3 High School, deputy head of Publicity Department of the CCP Teng County Committee, and deputy party secretary of Teng County. In August 1980, he was promoted to party secretary of Wenshang County, but having held the position for only two years. In July 1982, he was appointed party secretary of Qufu Normal University. He was appointed deputy secretary-general of the CCP Shandong Provincial Committee, in addition to serving as director of the General Office. He was party secretary of Zibo in June 1985, and held that office until March 1989. He became vice governor of Shandong in February 1988, and then governor, beginning in February 1988. He rose to become party secretary in March 1989. He was chosen as party secretary of Shandong in October 1994, concurrently serving as chairman of Shandong Provincial People's Congress since February 1995.

Government offices
Preceded by Jiang Chunyun	Governor of Shandong; 1989–1995	Succeeded by Li Chunting
Party political offices
Preceded by Jiang Chunyun	Party Secretary of Shandong; 1994–1997	Succeeded by Wu Guanzheng
Assembly seats
Preceded by Li Zhen	Chairman of Shandong Provincial People's Congress; 1996–20202	Succeeded by Han Xikai
