= Zheng Xuexuan =

Chinese politician

- 郑学选
- Born: April 1966 (age 60); China
- Education: Chongqing University
- Occupations: Executive, politician
- Agent: China State Construction Engineering Group Co., Ltd.
- Political party: Chinese Communist Party

Chinese name
- Simplified Chinese: 郑学选
- Traditional Chinese: 鄭學選
Transcriptions
Standard Mandarin
- Hanyu Pinyin: Zhèng Xuéxuǎn

Zheng Xuexuan (Chinese: 郑学选; born April 1966) is a Chinese executive and politician who is the current chairman of the China State Construction Engineering Group Co., Ltd.

He is an alternate of the 20th Central Committee of the Chinese Communist Party.

== Biography ==
Zheng was born in April 1966. He joined the Chinese Communist Party (CCP) in July 1987. In 1989, he graduated from Chongqing Institute of Architecture and Engineering (now Chongqing University).

In January 2017, he became deputy general manager of the China State Construction Engineering Group Co., Ltd., rising to general manager in November 2019. On 16 November 2021, the Organization Department of the Chinese Communist Party appointed him chairman of the group, replacing Zhou Naixiang, who was chosen as governor of Shandong in September.

Business positions
Preceded by Zhou Naixiang	Chairman of the China State Construction Engineering Group Co., Ltd. 2021–	Incumbent
