= Wang Yun (born 1916) =

Chinese politician

Wang Yun (1916 – August 3, 2010) was a Chinese politician. She served as the second and the third executive committee member of the All-China Women's Federation. She was the secretary of the fourth secretariat, the first director of the Legal Advisory Office of the All-China Women's Federation; the representative of the third National People's Congress and the sixth Member of the Seventh National Committee of the Chinese People's Political Consultative Conference.

== Life ==
Yun graduated in 1933 from Suzhou Women's Normal School of Jiangsu Province. In 1936, she graduated from the Suzhou High School of Jiangsu Province. She went to Yan'an in 1938 and studied at Xunyi Branch of Shaanbei Public School. From the end of 1938 to 1941, she was transferred to Yan'an China Women's University as a propaganda officer, and studied in the advanced class. From 1941 to 1947, she served as the secretary of the Central Women's Committee, the head of the women's life investigation team of the Northwest Bureau, the clerk and primary school teacher in Peizhuang Township, Yan'an, and the researcher of the Central Women's Committee. In 1947, she joined the Shanxi-Chahar-Hebei Central Land Reform Working Group. At the end of 1947, she left the Central Women's Committee to participate in the land reform and rectification work of the Shandong Bohai District Chinese Communist Party Committee and served as the team leader. After the liberation of Jinan in September 1948, she served as secretary of the Supervisory Committee of Jinan Textile Factory. In 1949, she served as deputy secretary-general and deputy director of the Shanghai Women's Federation.

In 1952, Yun was transferred to the deputy secretary and secretary of the Women's Committee of the Shandong Provincial Committee of the Chinese Communist Party, director of the Shandong Women's Federation, and an alternate member of the Shandong Provincial CCP Committee. From 1955 to 1958, she served as deputy director and director of the General Office of the All-China Women's Federation (ACWF). In 1958, she served as a researcher of the mass working group of the General Office of the Chinese Communist Party, focusing on women's mass work. In 1960, she was transferred to the Supervisory Committee of the Jiangsu Provincial Committee of the Chinese Communist Party as a full-time member. From 1977 to 1984, she served as director of the general office of the ACWF and secretary of the fourth secretariat, in charge of the general office, CCP committees, cadres and personnel, and safeguarding the rights and interests of women and children. From 1983 to 1987, she served as the deputy head of the inspection team of the Office of the Central Party Consolidation Steering Committee. She was also a consultant of the China Women's Lawyers Association and a member of the China Women's Movement Historical Data Compilation Committee.

Yun died in Beijing on August 3, 2010.

== Family ==
- Husband: Li Shiying (李士英)
