= Jiang Daming =

Chinese politician

- 姜大明
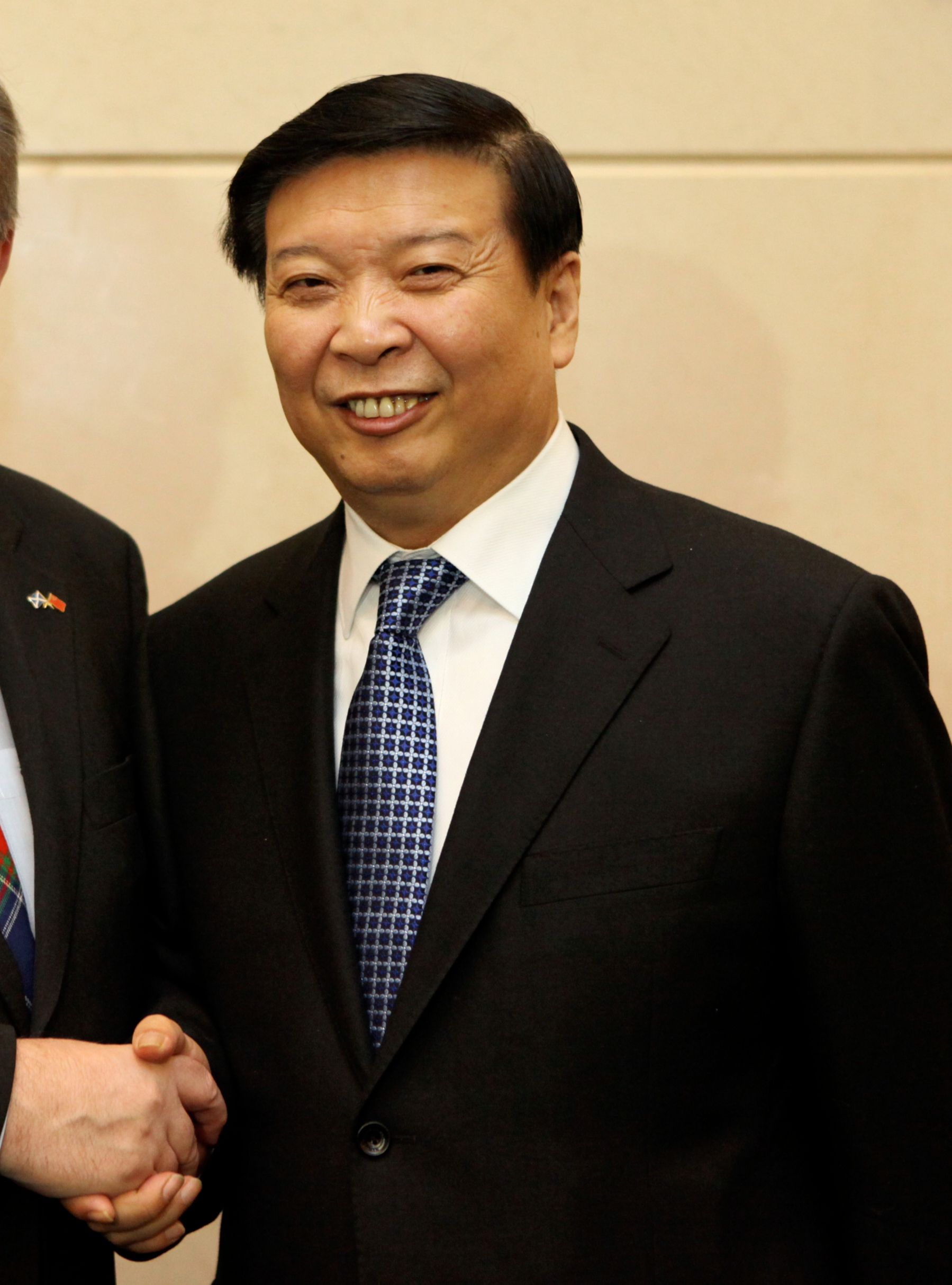
- Jiang in 2011

Minister of Land and Resources
- In office 16 March 2013 – 19 March 2018
- Premier: Li Keqiang
- Preceded by: Xu Shaoshi
- Succeeded by: Office abolished

Governor of Shandong
- In office 13 June 2007 – 16 March 2013
- Party Secretary: Li Jianguo; Jiang Yikang
- Preceded by: Han Yuqun
- Succeeded by: Guo Shuqing

Personal details
- Born: 1 March 1953 (age 73) Rongcheng, Shandong, China
- Party: Chinese Communist Party
- Education: Heilongjiang University; Harbin Institute of Technology; Central Party School of the Chinese Communist Party

Jiang Daming (Chinese: 姜大明; pinyin: Jiāng Dàmíng; born 1953) is a politician of the People's Republic of China. He served as the Minister of Land and Resources, and formerly served as Governor of Shandong.

== Career ==
Jiang was born in Rongcheng, Shandong province. He joined the Chinese Communist Party in 1976, and in 1982 received a bachelor's degree in philosophy from Heilongjiang University. He also received degrees in management at the Harbin Institute of Technology in 1996 and politics at the Central Party School of the Chinese Communist Party in 2001.

He has held numerous positions, including in Heilongjiang's production development team, vice-chairman of the All-China Youth Federation, member of the standing committee of the Shandong provincial committee and head of its organization department, vice-secretary and organization department head of the Shandong provincial committee, and Communist Party secretary of Jinan city.

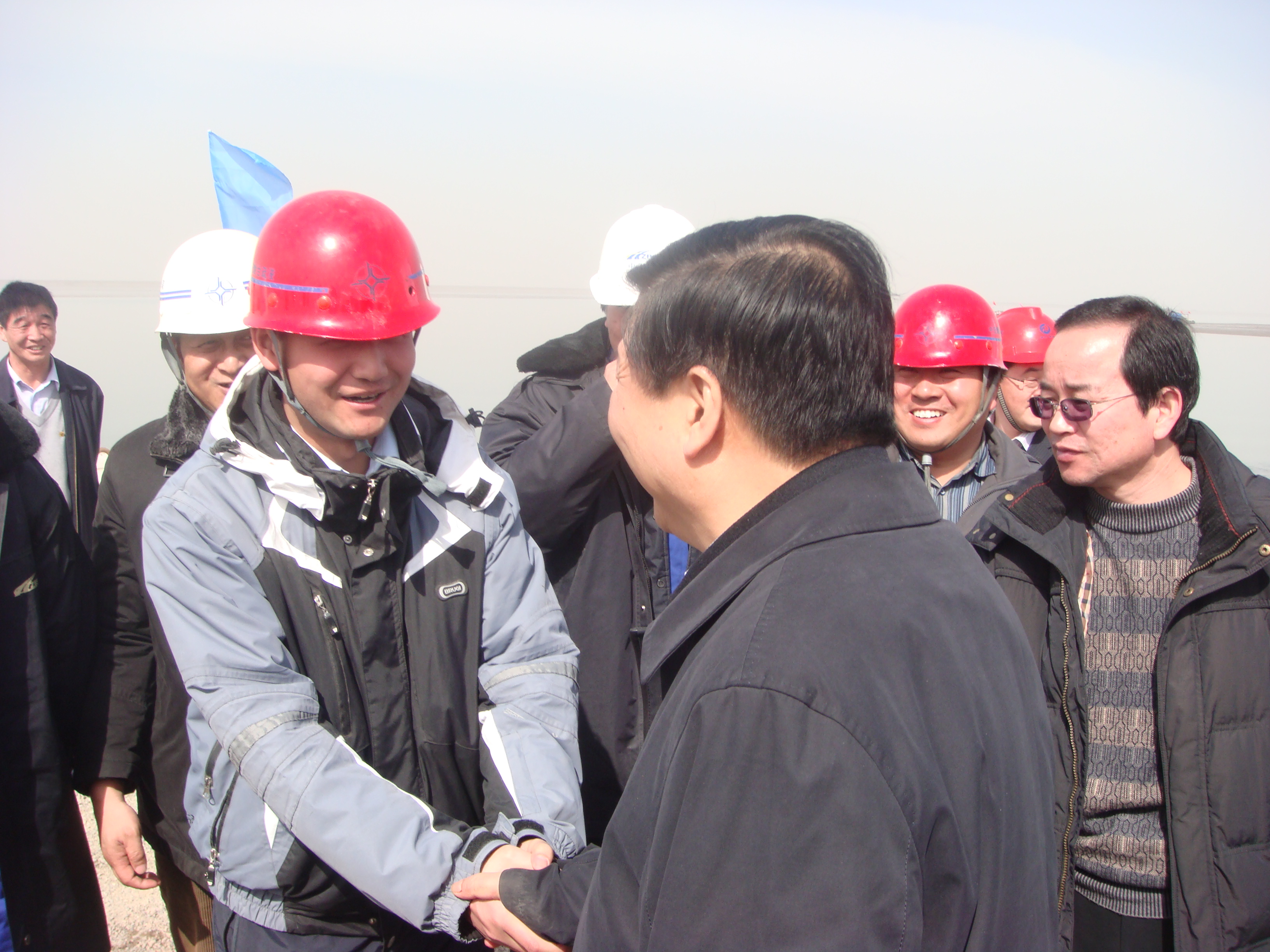
Jiang inspecting a construction site in Weifang, March 2010

In May 2007, he also became secretary of the Shandong government Party group. In June of the same year, he was elevated to vice-governor of Shandong province, and the acting governor. In January 2008, he formally became governor of Shandong province. He was appointed to the Minister of Land and Resources in March 2013.

He served as an alternate member of the 16th Central Committee of the Chinese Communist Party, and a member of 17th and 18th Central Committee.
