= Qin Hezhen =

Chinese politician

Qin Hezhen (Chinese: 秦和珍; 1913–1996) was a Chinese politician. He was born in Jinxiang County, Shandong Province. During the Second Sino-Japanese War, he formed a guerrilla force to fight the Empire of Japan invaders. This force was later incorporated into the Eighth Route Army and was active on the border between Shandong, Jiangsu and Henan provinces. He also participated in the Chinese Civil War that followed. In 1977, Qin was made vice-governor of Shandong and became chairman of the provincial people's congress in 1983. He was a delegate to the 6th National People's Congress and the 7th National People's Congress.

Preceded by Zhao Lin	Chairman of Shandong People's Congress; 1983–1985	Succeeded by Li Zhen
