= Lu Maozeng =

Chinese politician

- 陆懋曾

Chairman of the Shandong Provincial Committee of the Chinese People's Political Consultative Conference
- In office 1993–1998
- Preceded by: Li Zichao
- Succeeded by: Han Xikai

Personal details
- Born: December 1928 Zhenjiang, Jiangsu, China
- Died: 21 July 2022 (aged 93) Jinan, Shandong, China
- Party: Chinese Communist Party

Chinese name
- Simplified Chinese: 陆懋曾
- Traditional Chinese: 陸懋曾
Transcriptions
Standard Mandarin
- Hanyu Pinyin: Lù Màozēng

Lu Maozeng (Chinese: 陆懋曾; December 1928 – 21 July 2022) was a Chinese wheat breeding expert and politician who served as chairman of the Shandong Provincial Committee of the Chinese People's Political Consultative Conference from 1993 to 1998.

He was a representative of the 12th, 13th, 14th, and 15th National Congress of the Chinese Communist Party. He was an alternate member of the 12th Central Committee of the Chinese Communist Party and a member of the 13th Central Committee of the Chinese Communist Party.

== Early life and education ==
Lu was born in Zhenjiang, Jiangsu, in December 1928. His grandfather Lu Xiaobo (陆小波) was an industrialist. He graduated from the University of Nanking in 1950.

== Career ==
He entered the workforce in March 1950, and joined the Chinese Communist Party (CCP) in December 1953. He worked at the Shandong Provincial Agricultural Sciences Academy for a long time.

Between 1966 and 1969, during the Cultural Revolution, he was sent to the May Seventh Cadre Schools to do farm works. He was reinstated in October 1969 and continued to work at the Shandong Provincial Agricultural Sciences Academy.

He was appointed deputy party secretary of Shandong in March 1983, concurrently serving as vice president and honorary president of Shandong Provincial Science and Technology Association. In March 1989, he became vice chairman and party group secretary of the Shandong Provincial Committee of the Chinese People's Political Consultative Conference, rising to chairman in October 1993. He also served as president of Shandong Provincial Association for Friendship with Foreign Countries. He retired in December 2003.

On 22 July 2022, he died of an illness in Jinan, Shandong, at the age of 93.

== Contributions ==
Lu was engaged in wheat breeding and high-yield cultivation research for a long time, and cooperated with others to select and promote 21 excellent wheat varieties, including "Mount Tai 1" and "Jinan 2".

Assembly seats
Preceded by Li Zichao	Chairman of the Shandong Provincial Committee of the Chinese People's Political Consultative Conference; 1993–1998	Succeeded by Han Xikai
