= Yang Dezhi =

Chinese general and politician

- 杨得志
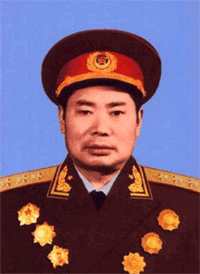
- Born: January 3, 1911; Liling, Hunan, Qing China
- Died: August 25, 1994 (aged 83); Beijing, China
- Military career
- Allegiance: China
- Branch: People's Liberation Army Ground Force
- Service years: 1928-1987
- Rank: General
- Conflicts: Chinese Civil War; Second Sino-Japanese War; Korean War; Sino-Vietnamese War

Yang Dezhi (simplified Chinese: 杨得志; traditional Chinese: 楊得志; pinyin: Yáng Dézhì, 3 January 1911 – 25 October 1994) was a Chinese general of the People's Liberation Army (PLA) who served as its chief of the General Staff from 1980 until his retirement in 1987. The son of a blacksmith and a former miner, he joined the Red Army in 1928 and commanded the regiment that forced the crossing of the Dadu River during the Long March. He fought in the Second Sino-Japanese War and the Chinese Civil War, led the 19th Army Group of the Chinese People's Volunteers in the Korean War, and later commanded the Volunteers. He was made a general in 1955. After commanding the Jinan and Wuhan military regions, he was given command of Chinese operations on the western front of the Sino-Vietnamese War in 1979, although illness took him away from the front days after the invasion began. He sat on the Politburo from 1982 to 1987.

== Early life ==
Yang was born in 1911 in Liling, Hunan, and his original name was Yang Jingtang. He was the son of a blacksmith and worked as a miner in his youth. According to William Whitson and Huang Chen-hsia, he worked at the Anyuan coal mine near Pingxiang from the age of 16 and may have heard Mao Zedong speak there during strike organizing in 1927. They also state that he joined a force that followed Mao to Changsha in the summer of 1927 and took part in that failed uprising.

== Military career ==
Chinese accounts date the start of his military career to 1928, when he joined the Seventh Division of the Workers' and Peasants' Revolutionary Army, formed after the Southern Hunan Uprising. He joined the Chinese Communist Party (CCP) in the same year. He first served as a messenger at divisional headquarters and then as a soldier in its special duty company, and he later marched with the division to the Jinggang Mountains.

Yang fought in the early battles around the Jinggang Mountains and was assigned to Lin Biao's 28th Regiment, with which he fought in Jiangxi and Fujian in 1929. In early 1932, he commanded the artillery company of the 11th Division and then headed the administrative section of the 45th Division. He later commanded the 1st Regiment of the 1st Division under Lin and Nie Rongzhen. On the night of 24 May 1935, during the Long March, Yang led the regiment's 1st Battalion through the rain towards Anshunchang on the Dadu River. The battalion commander, Sun Jixian, picked an assault team of 17 volunteers from the 2nd Company. At 7 a.m. on 25 May, four local boatmen ferried the team across the river. Yang watched the far bank through binoculars and ordered mortar fire on the Sichuan army's positions as the boat approached. In 1936, Yang commanded the Red Army's 2nd Division during the western expedition into Gansu and Ningxia. In early 1937, he and Chen Geng led a group of Long March veterans to Yan'an to study at the Counter-Japanese University.

=== Second Sino-Japanese War ===
In August 1937, after the Red Army was reorganized into the Eighth Route Army, Yang was appointed commander of the 685th Regiment of the 343rd Brigade, 115th Division. In September 1937, he led the regiment in the Pingxingguan campaign. In late 1938, in southern Hebei, his troops and those of Yang Yong formed a unit known to the Kuomintang as the Second Column of the Eighth Route Army, with Yang Dezhi as commander, Yang Yong as his deputy and Su Zhenhua as political commissar. The 685th Regiment remained his main force in the Hebei–Shandong–Henan Military Region until the end of the war in 1945. In early November 1943, as commander of the military region, he ordered Zeng Siyu's Second Military Subdistrict to lead a campaign against the gradual encroachment of Sun Liangcheng's forces.

=== Chinese Civil War ===
In August 1946, Yang and Xiao Ke retreated in the face of an offensive by three reinforced Nationalist corps concentrated on the rail lines between Beiping and Shenyang. On 9 September 1947, on the orders of the Central Military Commission, Yang, Luo Ruiqing and Yang Chengwu led the Shanxi–Chahar–Hebei Field Army into a campaign north of the Daqing River. In October, Yang, Yang Chengwu and Geng Biao turned south to intercept the Nationalist 3rd Army as it crossed the Hutuo River, acting first and reporting to headquarters afterwards because their radio could not reach it. The battle at Qingfengdian on 20–22 October destroyed the headquarters and the 7th Division of the 3rd Army and captured its commander, Luo Lirong. The three commanders then proposed an attack on Shijiazhuang, which the Central Military Commission approved on 23 October, and the Nationalist 32nd Division there was annihilated by 12 November.

In April 1948, Yang commanded the 2nd Army, later redesignated the 19th, under the North China Military Region of Nie Rongzhen and Xu Xiangqian. His deputy was Geng Biao and his political commissar was Luo Ruiqing. The army group brought together several officers who later held prominent posts, among them Geng Biao, Luo Ruiqing, Yang Chengwu and Pan Zili. In the spring of 1949, Yang's 19th Army besieged Taiyuan, where he worked closely with Xu Xiangqian's 18th Army. After that battle, he reinforced Peng Dehuai at Lanzhou and remained with him into Ningxia through 1949. He set up the Ningxia Military Control Committee and commanded the local military district as the war drew to a close.

=== Korean War ===
After the outbreak of the Korean War, Yang's 19th Army Group was moved to Shandong, where it was re-equipped with Soviet weapons. In February 1951, he led it into Korea to reinforce Peng Dehuai's Chinese People's Volunteers (CPV), and he became a deputy commander of the CPV. Reviewing Xiaobing Li's study of the 1951 spring offensive, James R. Smither writes that Yang's armies had no time to learn the terrain or to train with their newly issued Soviet weapons, but that Yang, "who always followed orders, went forward anyway". In the fifth offensive, Yang's forces attacked the ROK 1st Division and the British 29th Brigade, destroying the Gloucester Battalion during the push towards Seoul. In May 1952, his forces were driven back from Chorwon and, after suffering heavy casualties, withdrew north to be reinforced by Yang Chengwu's 20th Army.

Yang's army group also took part in the summer and autumn defensive campaign of 1951, the autumn counteroffensive of 1952, including the Battle of Triangle Hill, and the summer offensive of 1953. He remained in Korea until 1955 and was overall commander of the CPV in 1954 and 1955, having been appointed to the post by the Central Military Commission in October 1954.

=== Regional commands ===
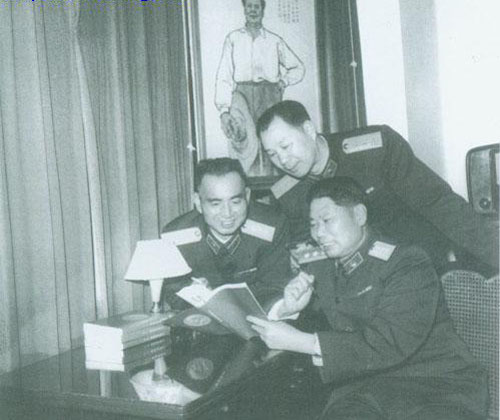
"The Three Yangs" (from left): Yang Yong, Yang Chengwu and Yang Dezhi

Yang was made a general in 1955. At the Eighth Party Congress in September 1956, he was elected an alternate member of the Central Committee, and he became a full member at the Eleventh Plenum of the 8th Central Committee in August 1966. He commanded the Jinan Military Region from September 1958 to January 1974 and the Shandong Military District from April 1971 to January 1974. He then commanded the Wuhan Military Region from January 1974 to January 1979 and the Kunming Military Region from January 1979 to February 1980.

=== Sino-Vietnamese War ===
At a meeting of the Central Military Commission on New Year's Eve 1978, Deng Xiaoping gave Yang, then commander of the Wuhan Military Region, command of operations against Vietnam from Yunnan in the west, while Xu Shiyou commanded from Guangxi in the east. The appointment sidestepped Wang Bicheng, the commander of the Kunming Military Region, and the historian Xiaoming Zhang notes rumors that the change stemmed partly from a poor personal relationship between Xu and Wang. Yang formally replaced Wang in Kunming on 7 January 1979.

Planning meetings on 8–10 January set out the Yunnan campaign. The 13th and 14th Armies were to destroy a regular Vietnamese division in the Lào Cai and Cam Đường area and then try to engage a second division at Sa Pa, while the 11th Army carried out a separate operation around Phong Thổ. With their artillery, armored, engineering and independent units, the three armies numbered about 150,000 troops, and a forward command post was to be set up at Kaiyuan, between Kunming and Hekou. A planned attack on Điện Biên Phủ was dropped when the leadership on the Yunnan front changed. The 13th Army, the main striking force in Yunnan, had to fill 70 companies before the attack and took in 15,381 additional soldiers, of whom 11,874 were new recruits. Zhang found no sources that mention any coordination between the Guangzhou and Kunming military regions, which attacked independently.

In the first stage of the war, from 17 to 25 February 1979, Chinese forces captured the provincial capital of Lào Cai and the town of Cam Đường. In the second stage, from 26 February to 5 March, the Yunnan forces fought for Sa Pa and Phong Thổ in the north-west. Four days after the invasion began, however, Yang was rushed to hospital in Beijing with serious stomach bleeding. Zhang writes that the Yunnan campaign was therefore planned by Wang Bicheng but carried out by Yang's two deputies, supported by a team of staff officers from the PLA General Staff. He also argues that it is misleading to claim that Yang would have been a better military leader than Xu. According to Zhang, Chinese casualties were lighter in Yunnan than in Guangxi, with 2,812 killed and 5,074 wounded.

Other Western accounts give Yang a broader role. The military historian James H. Willbanks described him as Xu's deputy in tactical control of the operations, chosen because the terrain of northern Vietnam resembled that of Korea, where Yang had developed tactics of infiltration and envelopment followed by mass attacks. Willbanks wrote that elements of three armies, more than 125,000 troops, attacked on the Lào Cai front, with the 11th Army moving on Phong Thổ and the 13th and 14th Armies on Lào Cai, and that the Chinese used human wave attacks to overcome the Vietnamese positions. R. C. Lutz writes that Yang committed massive frontal attacks supported by tanks and artillery against Lào Cai. The Christian Science Monitor described Yang as one of the two main commanders of the month-long war. Reviewing Zhang's book, Edwin Moïse noted that the war placed a heavy burden on Guangxi and especially Yunnan, from which the operations were mounted, and that the central government did not compensate the two provinces.

== Chief of the General Staff ==
In February 1980, Yang succeeded Deng Xiaoping as chief of staff of the PLA. He had been added to the standing committee of the Central Military Commission in January 1980. At the Fifth Plenum of the 11th Central Committee in February 1980, he became one of the eleven secretaries of the re-established Central Secretariat, on which he served until September 1982. At the first plenum of the 12th Central Committee in September 1982, he was elected to the Politburo. He also served as a vice minister of national defense and as deputy secretary-general of the Central Military Commission.

In 1981, Yang visited the Swiss armed forces at Thun. In January 1983, the People's Daily reported that he had told PLA officers to study foreign military technology, which The Christian Science Monitor described as a keystone of Deng's reform policy. Yang left the Politburo in 1987, and at the first plenum of the 13th Central Committee in November 1987 he was named to the standing committee of the Central Advisory Commission.

== Later life ==
During the Tiananmen Square protests in May 1989, Yang joined Ye Fei, Zhang Aiping, Xiao Ke, Song Shilun, Chen Zaidao, Li Jukui and other veteran commanders in a letter to the military authorities that opposed the army's entry into Beijing. According to a British Foreign Office record citing the China News Service, the letter stated that "the People's Army belongs to the people" and that "to prevent the situation worsening, troops must not enter the city". The New York Times later reported that the People's Daily did not print the letter because one of its signatories objected that it was not meant to be made public.

Yang died in Beijing on 25 October 1994.

== Personal life ==
Yang was married to Shen Gejun. In his memoir of the Korean War, Yang recalled that in 1950 she was serving as assistant to the head of the organization section of the political department, and that she was pregnant at the time. When his army set out from Xi'an for Shandong on 22 November 1950, Shen and their three daughters, Huarong, Baihua and Qiuhua, rode with him, and the children were later sent on to Taiyuan by train from Zhengzhou.

His son Yang Jianhua became a major general and head of the joint logistics department of the Nanjing Military Region. Yang's eldest daughter married Huang Xin, who later became a lieutenant general and deputy political commissar of the PLA Air Force. According to Huang, Yang personally chose to send his three sons-in-law in turn to the southern front from 1979 onward.

== Honours ==
- People's Republic of China:
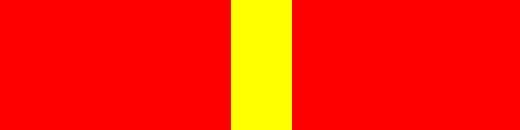
  - Order of August 1 (1st Class Medal) (1955)
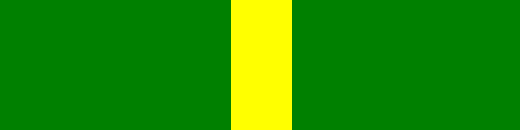
  - Order of Independence and Freedom (1st Class Medal) (1955)
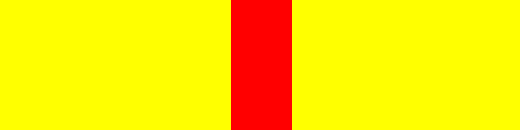
  - Order of Liberation (1st Class Medal) (1955)
- North Korea:
  - Order of the National Flag (1st Class) (8 February 1953 and 25 June 1953)
  - Order of Freedom and Independence (1st Class)

In keeping with Yang's wishes, his children donated his decorations and other relics to institutions including the National Museum of China and the Military Museum. The family has also given relics to the Lukou Museum at his former residence in eight batches, and the items shown there include a Japanese army cap captured at Pingxingguan and an American first-aid kit seized in Korea.

== See also ==
- List of officers of the People's Liberation Army

Political offices
Preceded by Wang Xiaoyu	Governor of Shandong; 1971–1974	Succeeded by Bai Rubing
Preceded by Wang Xiaoyu	Secretary of the CPC Shandong Committee; 1971–1974	Succeeded by Bai Rubing
Military offices
New title	Commander of the PLA Shaanxi Military District; 1949–1950	Succeeded by Liu Jinxuan
Preceded by Deng Xiaoping	Head of PLA General Staff Department; 1980–1987	Succeeded by Chi Haotian
