= Bai Rubing =

Chinese politician

Bai Rubing (Chinese: 白如冰) (1912–1994) was a Chinese politician. He was born in Qingjian County, Shaanxi Province. He joined the Chinese Communist Party in 1928. He was a member of the Chinese Workers' and Peasants' Red Army and Eighth Route Army. He was Chinese Communist Party Committee Secretary and two-time governor of Shandong Province. He was a relative of Bai Dongcai, Communist Party Chief and governor of Jiangxi Province, and Bai Enpei, governor and Communist Party Chief of Qinghai Province and Communist Party Chief of Yunnan Province.

Party political offices
Preceded by Yang Dezhi	Communist Party Chief of Shandong; 1974	Succeeded by Su Yiran
Preceded by Tan Qilong	Governor of Shandong	Succeeded by Wang Xiaoyu
Preceded by Tan Qilong	Chairman of the CPPCC Shandong Committee	Succeeded by Gao Keting
