= Hu Ying (revolutionary) =

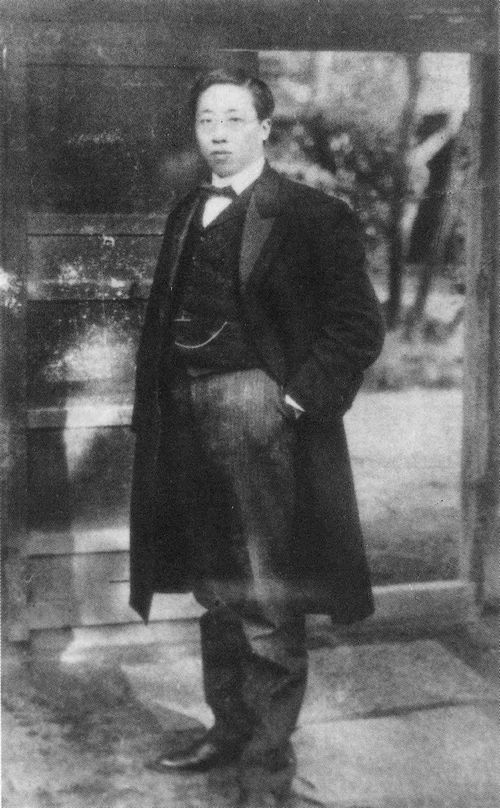

Hu Ying (1884–November 1933), originally named Zu Mao, courtesy name Jingwu, later changed to Ying, courtesy name Jingwu, also known by the pseudonyms Zongwan and Xuan'an, was a democratic revolutionary, political figure, and military leader during the late Qing Dynasty and early Republic of China. He was born in Baishishi Village, Shangxiang, Taoyuan County, Changde Prefecture, Hunan Province, and his ancestral home was in Shaoxing, Zhejiang Province. He was a contemporary of Song Jiaoren.

== Biography ==
=== Early life and revolutionary activities ===
Hu Ying's ancestral home was in Shaoxing Prefecture, Zhejiang Province, and he was born into a small official's family in Baishishi Village, Shangxiang, Taoyuan County, Changde Prefecture, Hunan. He and Song Jiaoren were fellow townsmen. He studied in Changsha during his childhood and graduated from the Zheng School in Changsha at the age of 16. He later attended the Mingde Academy in Hunan, where he became a disciple of Huang Xing. Due to his involvement in a failed assassination attempt on Wang Xianqian, Hu Ying sought refuge in Wuchang through an introduction from Cao Yabo, carrying a letter of introduction from Huang Xing. He then decided to enlist in the 8th Army Engineering Battalion of the Hubei Army.

Hu Ying was known for his youthful charisma and eloquence. After enlisting, he met Zhang Nanxian, and the two of them began giving speeches during leisure time to inspire the soldiers.

In February 1904 (the 30th year of the Guangxu era), Hu Ying joined the Huaxing Society, organized by Huang Xing. After the founding of the Huaxing Society, Hu Ying and Song Jiaoren began planning the establishment of a revolutionary organization in Hubei. They secretly set up the "Science Supplementary School" as a front to deceive the authorities, while actually using it to lay the groundwork for the revolutionary movement in Wuchang. In March, Hu Ying went to Wuchang to serve as the head of the Huaxing Society's Hubei branch. In June, the Science Supplementary School held its founding ceremony, with Lu Dazhen, a top student from Hubei Higher Learning, appointed as the principal, Hu Ying as the general secretary, and Song Jiaoren as the document secretary. The school recruited staff from various military camps and schools, whose main task was to introduce new recruits into the military. Many members of the Hubei New Army were revolutionaries introduced through the Science Supplementary School.

After the failed revolutionary uprising, the school was shut down. In the winter of that year, Hu Ying attempted to assassinate Tie Liang but failed, forcing him to flee to Japan. Initially enrolling in the Army Officer School, Hu Ying later transferred to the Faculty of Political Economy at Waseda University. In August, the Tongmenghui (Chinese United League) was established in Tokyo, and Hu Ying was elected as a member of the council.

In December 1906, Hu Ying followed Sun Yat-sen's instructions to return to China and continued his revolutionary activities in Hubei. However, in January 1907, he was arrested by the Qing government due to his involvement in the "Zhizhi Society case" and imprisoned.

=== From Anti-Yuan to the Preparatory Committee for the Annuity Fund ===
In the summer of 1909 (the first year of the Xuantong era), Hu Ying was sentenced to "life imprisonment." While in prison, he secretly made contact with revolutionary factions. In October 1911, the Wuchang Uprising broke out. The revolutionary activities of the Hubei New Army were not accidental, and key figures such as Liu Jing'an, Hu Ying, and Song Jiaoren played crucial roles in organizing the movement. Hu Ying was rescued by the revolutionaries and appointed Minister of Foreign Affairs in the Hubei Military Government. He later became the Hubei representative at the Provincial Governors' Representatives' Conference and attended the conference in Nanjing, participating in the formation of the Provisional Government of the Republic of China. In December, Hu Ying was appointed by Li Yuanhong to accompany the Qing government's representative, Tang Shaoyi, to Shanghai to participate in negotiations between the North and South.

On January 2, 1912, the same day as Tang Shaoyi's resignation, Hu Ying also resigned on the grounds of illness and moved to Nanjing. Shortly after, Sun Yat-sen appointed him as the Governor of Shandong. Hu Ying arrived in Yantai in February 1912 and set up the Shandong Military Government, making Yantai the temporary provincial capital. After the abdication of the Qing emperor, Hu Ying became embroiled in a power struggle with former Qing provincial governor Zhang Guangjian, with both accusing each other. Yuan Shikai appointed Zhang Guangjian as the Governor of Shandong, which led to a conflict between him and Hu Ying, who angrily resigned but stayed in Yantai. Yuan Shikai later replaced Zhang Guangjian with Zhou Ziqi as Governor of Shandong and appointed Hu Ying as the military governor of Gansu and Shaanxi. On May 10, Hu Ying was reassigned to the post of the governor of Xinjiang and Qinghai, but he did not take up the position and left Shandong on July 31. Hu Ying joined the Kuomintang organized by Song Jiaoren and was elected a senator in the Republic of China's National Assembly.

In 1913, after the assassination of Song Jiaoren, Hu Ying participated in the Second Revolution against Yuan Shikai. After the failure of the Second Revolution, he and Huang Xing went into exile in Japan. The following year, in August, Hu Ying, along with Huang Xing and Li Genyuan, organized the European Affairs Research Society. In the winter of that year, they returned to China. Afterward, Yuan Shikai invited Hu Ying to Beijing to serve as his advisor.

In August 1915, Hu Ying, Yang Du, Sun Yujun, Yan Fu, Liu Shipai, and Li Xiehe formed the Preparatory Committee for the Annuity Fund, supporting Yuan Shikai's attempt to become emperor. In 1916, after Yuan Shikai's failure to become emperor and his death on June 6, Li Yuanhong succeeded him as president. Hu Ying was not held responsible for his involvement in the Preparatory Committee and remained in seclusion.

=== After the Constitutional Protection Movement ===
Following the outbreak of the Constitutional Protection War, in December 1917, Hu Ying suddenly assumed the position of Pacification Commissioner and Commander of the Vanguard in western Hunan, leading troops to attack Hubei. The following year, he became the commander of the third army of the Jingguo Army. In 1924, Hu Ying, at Sun Yat-sen's request, went to the north to coordinate with Feng Yuxiang. He later participated in Feng Yuxiang's Beijing coup (the Capital Revolution).

After the National Revolutionary Army launched the Northern Expedition, Hu Ying served as the representative of Yan Xishan in Nanjing. Later, during Yan Xishan's anti-Chiang Kai-shek campaign, Hu Ying served as the commander of the Tenth Route Army. After the failure of the anti-Chiang forces, Hu Ying was wanted and fled to the Hankou concession. After the September 18 Incident, the warrant for Hu Ying's arrest was lifted, and he returned to the Nanjing National Government. He later sought treatment in a hospital due to illness.

In November 1933 (the 22nd year of the Republic of China), Hu Ying died in Nanjing at the age of 50.
