= Li Chunting =

Chinese politician (1936–2024)

- 李春亭

Governor of Shandong
- In office February 1995 – December 2001
- Party Secretary: Zhao Zhihao; Wu Guanzheng
- Preceded by: Zhao Zhihao
- Succeeded by: Zhang Gaoli

Personal details
- Born: October 1936 Qixia County, Shandong, China
- Died: 5 August 2024 (aged 87)
- Party: Chinese Communist Party
- Education: Chengdu Technological University

Li Chunting (Chinese: 李春亭; pinyin: Lǐ Chūntíng; October 1936 – 5 August 2024) was a Chinese politician who served as governor of Shandong from 1995 to 2001.

He was an alternate member of the 14th Central Committee of the Chinese Communist Party and a member of the 15th Central Committee of the Chinese Communist Party. He was a member of the Standing Committee of the 9th and 10th National People's Congress.

== Biography ==
Li was born in Qixia County, Shandong, in October 1936. He graduated from Chengdu University of Technology.

In 1957, he became a sent-down youth in his home-county. He joined the Chinese Communist Party (CCP) in 1958. In April 1968, during the Cultural Revolution, he was forced to work in the fields but soon reinstated in September 1969. In January 1974, he was promoted to become party secretary of Yantai, a position he held until September 1976, when he was appointed director of the Shandong Metallurgical Bureau. He was manager and party branch secretary of Shandong Metallurgical Industry Corporation in October 1983, and held that office until February 1988. He served as deputy governor of Shandong in February 1988, and seven years later promoted to the governor position. He also served as deputy party secretary of Shandong from February 1992 to December 2001 and director of Shandong Provincial Structural Reform Commission from March 1991 to February 1995. In December 2001, he took office as vice chairperson of the National People's Congress Agriculture and Rural Affairs Committee, a post he kept until March 2008.

Li died on 5 August 2024, at the age of 87.

Government offices
Preceded by Zhao Zhihao	Governor of Shandong; 1995–2001	Succeeded by Zhang Gaoli
