= Zhao Jianmin =

Chinese politician

Zhao Jianmin (Chinese: 赵健民) (June 24, 1912 – April 8, 2012) was a Chinese politician. He was born in Guan County, Shandong Province. He was governor of his home province. During the Second Sino-Japanese War, Zhao was political commissar for a guerrilla force in his home county and became a battalion commander in the Eighth Route Army 129th Division. He was Committee Secretary for Jinan as part of the Shandong-Hebei-Henan border region military district. During the Cultural Revolution, he became the provincial communist party secretary of Yunnan Province, but was falsely accused and persecuted by his predecessor as governor, Kang Sheng.

== Zhao Jianmin Spy Case ==
In 1967 Zhao Jianmin, then provincial secretary of the Communist Party in Yunnan, suggested to Kang Sheng that the massacres in the Cultural Revolution should be resolved democratically and peacefully, Sheng relayed to Mao Zedong that Jianmin was a spy. The ensuing purges of pro-Jianmin followers and alleged spies killed over 17,000, injured or crippled 61,000, and implicated nearly 1.4 million people.

== See also ==
Preceded by Kang Sheng	Governor of Shandong; 1955–1958	Succeeded by Tan Qilong

== Bibliography ==
- Peter T. Y. Cheung, Chae-ho Chŏng, Zhimin Lin. Provincial Strategies of Economic Reform in Post-Mao China: Leadership.
- Sherman Xiaogang Lai. A Springboard to Victory: Shandong Province and Chinese Communist Military.
- Wolfgang Bartke. Who was Who in the People's Republic of China: With more than 3100 Portraits.
- David Goodman. Deng Xiaoping and the Chinese Revolution: A Political Biography.
- Peter Truhart. Asia & Pacific Oceania.
- Frederick C. Teiwes. Politics and Purges in China: Rectification and the Decline of Party Norms.
- Yang Jisheng. Tombstone: The Great Chinese Famine, 1958-1962.
