= Yidu (disambiguation) =

Yidu is a city and former county in Hubei, China.

Yidu may also refer to:

- Yidu County, Shandong (益都县), former name of Qingzhou City
- Yidu, Fuqing (一都镇), town in Fujian
- Yidu, Yongchun County (一都镇), town in Fujian
- Yidu, Guangdong (义都镇), town in Longchuan County
- Idu Mishmi language, or Yidu

== See also ==
- Idu script
