= Grand coordinator and provincial governor =

High government official of the Chinese Ming and Qing dynasties

Grand coordinator (Ming) Governor (Qing)

Chinese name
- Traditional Chinese: 巡撫
- Simplified Chinese: 巡抚
- Literal meaning: itinerant-&-pacifying [official] itinerant pacifier
Transcriptions
Standard Mandarin
- Hanyu Pinyin: xúnfǔ
- Wade–Giles: hsün-fu

Vietnamese name
- Vietnamese alphabet: Tuần phủ / Tuần vũ
- Chữ Hán: 巡撫

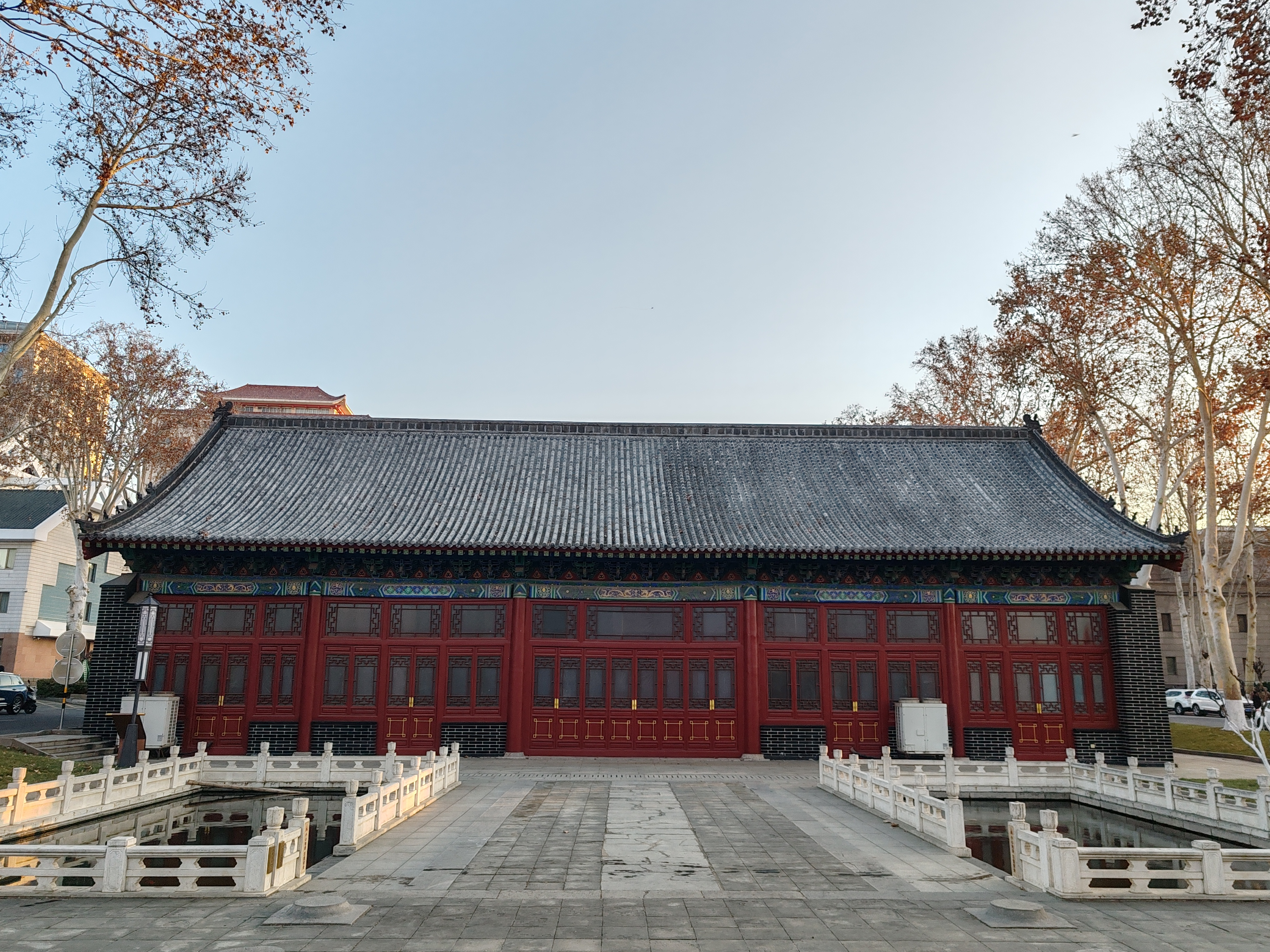
The office of former Shandong xunfu (Governor of Shandong) in Pearl Spring scenic area, Jinan

A xunfu was an important imperial Chinese provincial office under both the Ming (14th–17th centuries) and Qing (17th–20th centuries) dynasties. However, the purview of the office under the two dynasties differed markedly. Under the Ming dynasty, the post originated around 1430 as a kind of inspector-general and ad hoc provincial-level administrator; such a xunfu is usually translated as a grand coordinator. However, beginning in the mid-17th century, xunfu became the title of a regular provincial governor overseeing civil administration in the Qing dynasty.

Under both dynasties, the xunfu was subordinate in military affairs to the multi-provincial zongdu (總督), usually translated as "supreme commander" under the Ming and "governor-general" or "viceroy" under the Qing.

The Nguyễn dynasty of Vietnam also established the position (known as tuần phủ or tuần vũ 巡撫) based on the contemporaneous position of Qing China.

== Ming grand coordinator ==
The "grand coordinator" of the Ming dynasty (1368–1644) was one of several institutional innovations promoted by the Xuande Emperor (r. 1425–1435). Following precedents set by the Hongwu and Yongle emperors, who had sent officials on temporary civilian and military missions in the provinces, in September 1425 Xuande appointed officials to "tour and pacify" (xunfu) two southern provinces. Five years later, three more officials from the central government were sent to Henan, Shaanxi, and Sichuan on similar assignments. There is also evidence that more "touring pacifiers" were sent to the field between 1425 and 1430, when the position did not yet formally exist. In 1435, grand coordinators were also dispatched to provinces on the northern borders of the Ming empire, from Gansu in the west to Liaodong in the east. Eventually there were grand coordinators in every province.

Grand coordinators could also take charge of strategically important regions that were not provinces. In 1547, one was sent to curb smuggling and piracy on the coasts of Fujian and Zhejiang. Another one was appointed to Tianjin to protect access to Beijing in 1597 during a large-scale Japanese attack on Korea.

Grand coordinators were members of no specific agency and only received ad hoc commissions with no definite tenure. They managed and oversaw provincial government by coordinating the work of the three highest provincial agencies: the Provincial administration commission (buzheng si 布政司), the Provincial surveillance commission (ancha si 按察司), and the Regional military commissioner (du si 都司). Because grand coordinators were also high-ranking members of the Censorate, they had impeachment powers and direct access to the throne, which considered them to be "provincial-level surrogate[s] of the emperor". Although they were civil officials, they also received military titles when they had to supervise important military matters.

== Qing governor ==
The Qing dynasty (1644–1912) kept the position of xunfu, but gave it a meaning different enough that scholars have translated the Qing xunfu as "governor" instead of "grand coordinator".

== Nguyễn dynasty ==
In Vietnam under the Nguyễn dynasty the title of Tuần phủ (巡撫), or tuần vũ, existed as a similar office based on the contemporary Qing administrative position. A Tuần phủ typically governed a single province and was below the authority of a Tổng đốc.
