= Jiang Chunyun =

Chinese politician (1930–2021)

- 姜春云

Vice Chairman of the Standing Committee of the National People's Congress
- In office 16 March 1998 – 15 March 2003
- Chairperson: Li Peng

Head of the State Flood Control and Drought Relief Headquarters
- In office 8 May 1995 – 10 April 1998
- Premier: Li Peng
- Preceded by: Chen Junsheng
- Succeeded by: Wen Jiabao

Vice Premier of China
- In office March 1995 – March 1998 Serving with Zhu Rongji, Zou Jiahua, Qian Qichen, Li Lanqing, Wu Bangguo
- Premier: Li Peng
- Preceded by: Tian Jiyun
- Succeeded by: Wen Jiabao

Party Secretary of Shandong
- In office December 1988 – October 1994
- Governor: Himself; Zhao Zhihao
- Preceded by: Liang Buting
- Succeeded by: Zhao Zhihao

Governor of Shandong
- In office 1987–1989
- Party Secretary: Liang Buting; Himself
- Preceded by: Li Chang'an
- Succeeded by: Zhao Zhihao

Personal details
- Born: April 1930 Laixi County, Shandong, China
- Died: 28 August 2021 (aged 91) Beijing, China
- Party: Chinese Communist Party
- Education: Laixi County Teacher Training Class

Chinese name
- Simplified Chinese: 姜春云
- Traditional Chinese: 姜春雲
Transcriptions
Standard Mandarin
- Hanyu Pinyin: Jiāng Chūnyún

Jiang Chunyun (Chinese: 姜春云; April 1930 – 28 August 2021) was a Chinese politician most active in the 1980s and 1990s, who served as Vice Premier, Vice Chairman of the Standing Committee of the National People's Congress, and a member of the Politburo of the Chinese Communist Party.

== Biography ==
Jiang was born in Laixi County, Shandong Province, in April 1930, and started work in 1946; he joined the Chinese Communist Party (CCP) in February 1947. Since then, Jiang had served as secretary-general of the Chinese Communist Party Shandong Provincial Committee, secretary of the Central Committee of the Chinese Communist Party Jinan Municipal Committee, governor of Shandong province, secretary of the CCP Shandong Provincial Committee, and vice-premier of the State Council of the People's Republic of China.

When Jiang was elected Vice-Premier of the State Council by the National People's Congress in March 1995, 36 percent of delegates in the Congress either abstained or voted against confirming him. This was the largest protest vote in the Congress up to that time, and may have been due to the feeling of delegates that the NPC was not being allowed the authority it was granted under the Constitution of China.

He died from an illness in Beijing, aged 91.

He was a member of the Secretariat of the Chinese Communist Party, a member of the 13th, 14th, and 15th Central Committees, and a member of the 14th and 15th Politburos of the Chinese Communist Party.

Government offices
Preceded by Li Chang'an	Governor of Shandong; 1987–1988	Succeeded by Zhao Zhihao
Preceded by Tian Jiyun	Vice Premier of China; 1995–1998	Succeeded by Wen Jiabao
Preceded by Chen Junsheng	Head of the State Flood Control and Drought Relief Headquarters; 1995–1998	Succeeded by Wen Jiabao
Party political offices
Preceded by Liang Buting	Party Secretary of Shandong; 1988–1994	Succeeded by Zhao Zhihao
