= Hu Ying (chemist) =

Chinese physical chemist

- 胡英
- Born: 19 June 1934; Shanghai, China
- Died: 27 August 2023 (aged 89); Shanghai, China
- Education: East China University of Science and Technology
- Scientific career
- Fields: Physical chemistry
- Workplaces: East China University of Science and Technology

Hu Ying (Chinese: 胡英; pinyin: Hú Yīng; 19 June 1934 – 27 August 2023) was a Chinese physical chemist who was a professor at East China University of Science and Technology, an academician of the Chinese Academy of Sciences.

== Biography ==
Hu was born in Shanghai, on 19 June 1934, while his ancestral home is in Yingshan County, Hubei. After graduating from Shanghai High School in 1950, he was admitted to National Jiaotong University, and soon transferred to East China University of Chemical Technology (now East China University of Science and Technology). He taught there after graduation. He joined the Chinese Communist Party (CCP) in 1953. He was a visiting scholar at the University of California, Berkeley from 1982 to 1984.

He died of an illness at Zhongshan Hospital in Shanghai, on 27 August 2023, at the age of 89.

== Honours and awards ==
- 1993 Member of the Chinese Academy of Sciences (CAS)
