= Zhang Guangjian =

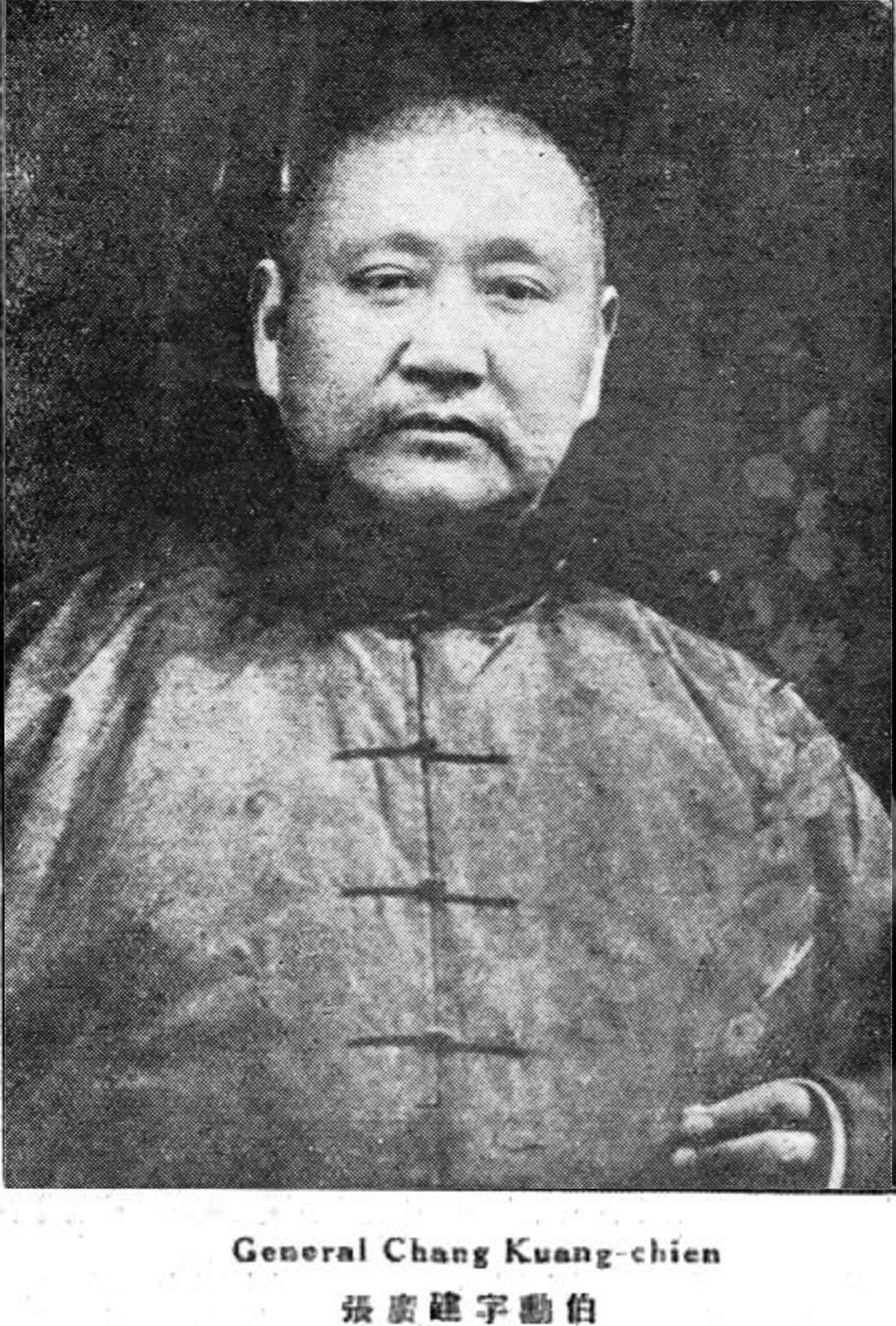
Zhang Guangjian

Zhang Guangjian (Chinese: 張廣建) (1864/1867 – 1938) was a Chinese politician of the late Qing Dynasty and early Republican period. A native of Hefei, Anhui, he was the last Qing governor of Shandong, serving after the outbreak of the Xinhai Revolution in the province until the establishment of the Republic of China. Under the Beiyang government, he served as military governor of Shandong and later in the province of Gansu. Zhang was supported by the Jahriyya Sufi Hui Muslim leader Ma Yuanzhang, while being opposed by Hui Muslim General Ma Fuxiang, with Ma Fuxiang basing his opposition to Zhang's governorship in Gansu on the fact that he was not a native of the province. Zhang enacted a monopoly over the wool trade in Gansu and started collecting taxes on it.

== Bibliography ==
- 來新夏等 (2000). 北洋軍閥史 下冊. Tianjin: Nankai University出版社. ISBN 7-310-01517-7.
- 徐友春主編 (2007). 民國人物大辞典 增訂版. Shijiazhuang: Hebei People's出版社. ISBN 978-7-202-03014-1.
- 林世田・劉波「國家珍貴古籍特展：跨越千年的對話」《光明日報》中華讀書報, 2009.6.24.
- 劉壽林等編 (1995). 民國職官年表. Beijing: 中華書局. ISBN 7-101-01320-1.
