= Pearl Spring =

Chinese Spring

Coordinates: 36°40′1.6″N 117°1′8″E

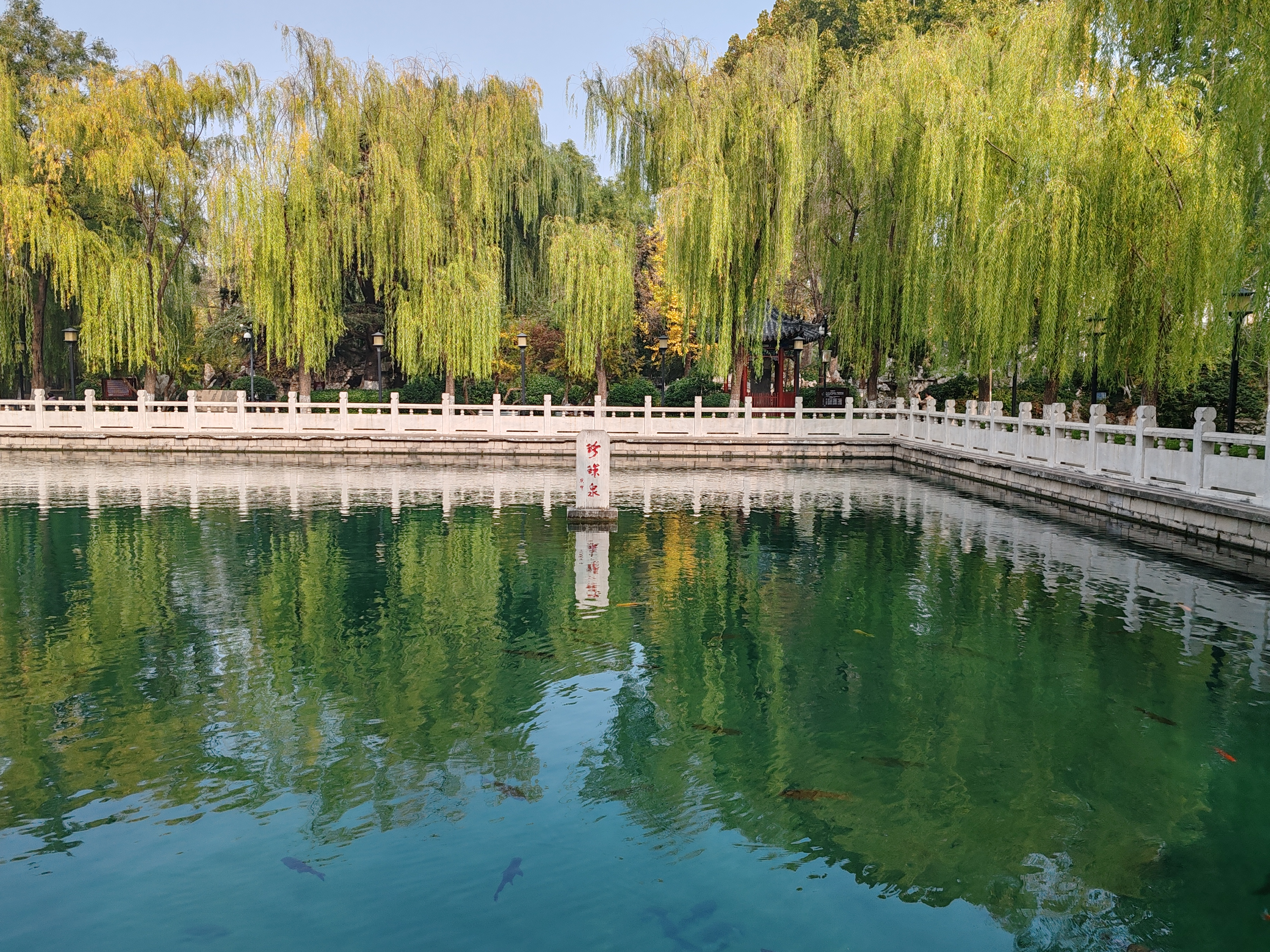
Pearl Spring with its name on the slate

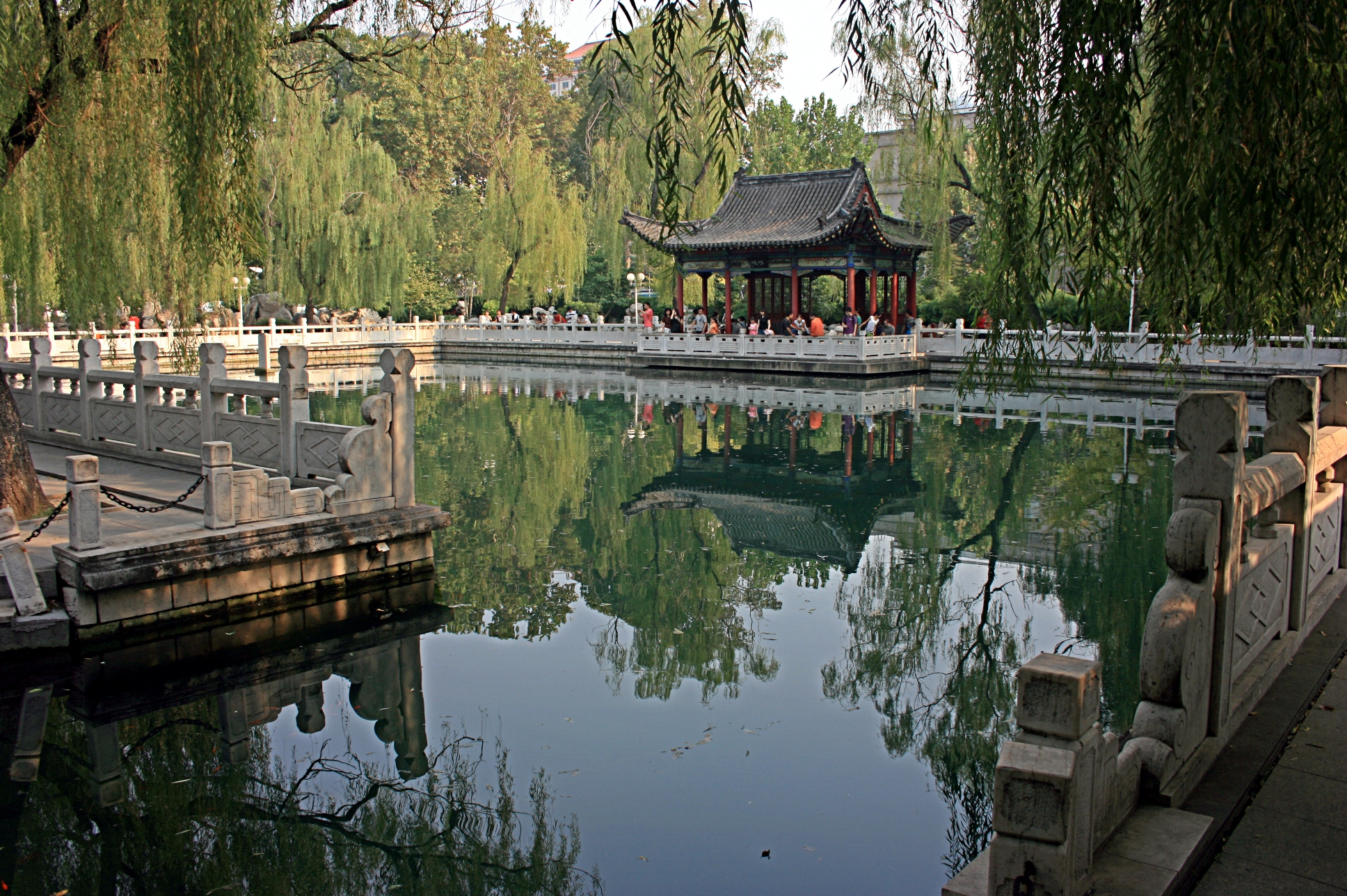
Spring pool

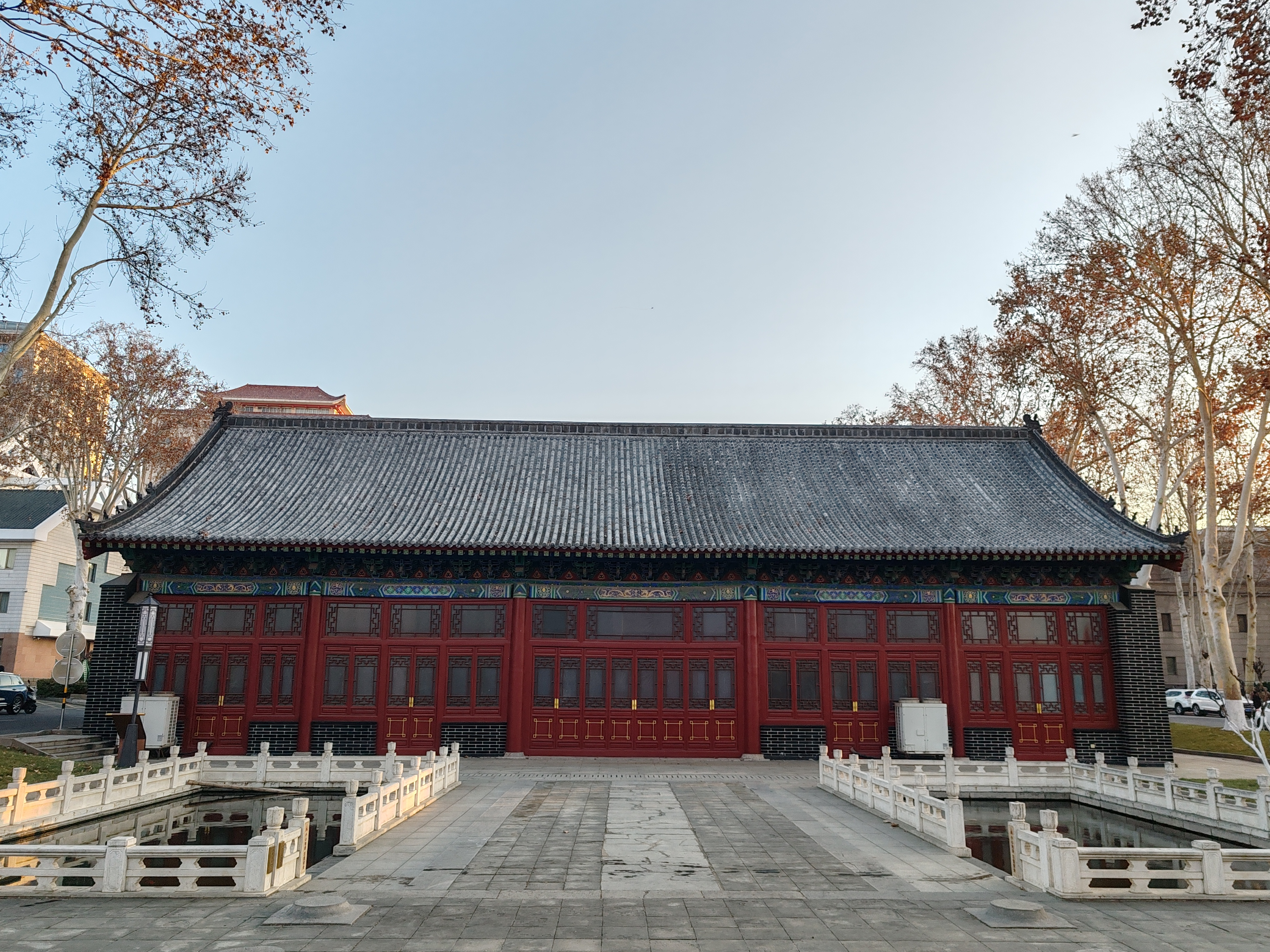
Former mansion of Governor of Shandong

The Pearl Spring (Chinese: 珍珠泉; pinyin: Zhēnzhū Quán) is a culturally significant artesian karst spring located in the city of Jinan, Shandong Province, China. The Pearl Spring is located on the bottom of in a square spring pool that is surrounded by a stone fence on all sides. The water flows off through a canal into the Daming Lake. The spring was incorporated into the garden of Prince De (德王) in the year 1466.

In 1638, the Mansion of Prince De was destroyed in war. In 1667, this site was rebuilt as Xunfu Yamen by Xunfu of Shandong Zhou Youde, and the provincial government continued to reside in vicinity of the spring until the 20th century when Japanese occupied Jinan. The name of the spring is said to be related to the bubbles forming in the spring.

After 1979, this place became the site of Shandong Provincial People's Congress.

== Spring group ==
Other springs in the Pearl Spring group are:

- Sanshui Spring (Chinese: 散水泉; pinyin: Sǎnshuǐ Quán)
- Brook Pavilion Spring (Chinese: 溪亭泉; pinyin: Xītíng Quán)
- Chu Spring (Chinese: 楚泉; pinyin: Chǔ Quán)

== Location ==
The Pearl Spring is located near the center of the old part of the city of Jinan to the south of the Daming Lake. Its street address is 1 Yuanqian Avenue, Jinan, Shandong, China.

== See also ==
- List of sites in Jinan
