= Han Yuqun =

Chinese politician

Han Yuqun (born 1943 in Suining, Jiangsu province) is a Chinese politician. He is vice-chairman of the Financial and Economic Committee of the National People's Congress. He was also governor of Shandong Province.

== Career ==
Han Yuqun joined the Chinese Communist Party (CCP) in 1975. He has served as deputy secretary of the CCP Jining City Committee in Shandong province, secretary of the CCP committee of Jining City, and head of the United Front Work Department of the Shandong Provincial Committee of the Chinese Communist Party.

In 1993 he was elected member of the standing committee of the CCP committee of Shandong province. Han served as vice-governor of Shandong province from 1995 to 1998, and then as governor from 2003 to 2007. He also became vice-chairman of the Financial and Economic Committee of the National People's Congress.

In 2011, Yuqun took part in a visit of China's legislators to Cambodia, which aimed to boost economic ties.
