= Shandong Provincial Committee of the Chinese Communist Party =

Shandong Provincial Committee of the Chinese Communist Party 中国共产党山东省委员会

Overview
- Type: Highest decision-making organ when Shandong Provincial Congress is not in session.
- Elected by: Shandong Provincial Congress
- Length of term: Five years
- Term limits: None
- First convocation: 20 March 1949
- Secretary: Lin Wu
- Deputy Secretary: Zhou Naixiang (Governor)
- Executive organ: Standing Committee
- Inspection organ: Commission for Discipline Inspection

The Shandong Provincial Committee of the Chinese Communist Party is the provincial committee of the Chinese Communist Party (CCP) in Shandong. The CCP committee secretary is the highest ranking post in the province. The current secretary is Lin Wu, who succeeded Li Ganjie on 29 December 2022.

== History ==
In 1921, the first CCP organizations in Shandong were established in Jinan. In July 1922, the Jinan Branch of the CCP was established, with Wang Jinmei as its secretary. On 6 October 1923, the Jinan Local Executive Committee of the CCP was established, with Wang as its chairman. In July 1924, the CCP Zibo Branch was established. In February 1925, CCP representatives from Jinan, Qingdao, Zhangdian, Zichuan and other places held a joint meeting in Jinan to establish the CCP Shandong Local Executive Committee. In October 1926, with the approval of the CCP Central Committee, the Shandong District Executive Committee was established with Wu Fang as secretary. On 13 June 1927, the Central Committee established the Shandong Provincial Committee, keeping Wu Fang as the secretary.

In January 1929, the Provincial CCP Committee was weakened due to a defector leading to the arrests of many committee members by the Nationalist government. In July 1933, the Provincial Committee was completely destroyed, losing contact with the CCP Central Committee. Some Party organizations were restored in 1934, including with the establishment of the Jinan Municipal Committee in May. In 1935, the Shandong Provincial Working Committee was established with Liu Zhongying as its secretary. On 1 May 1936, the Provincial Party Committee was reestablished. During the Second Sino-Japanese War, the Shandong Provincial Committee aided war efforts. In May 1938, the Shandong Provincial Committee was expanded into the Shandong-Henan-Anhui Border Region Provincial Committee; its name was changed to the CCP Shandong Branch in December 1938. The Committee also voted to establish a provincial newspaper, the Dazhong Daily.

On 13 August 1945, the Shandong Provincial Government was established. In December 1945, the Shandong Branch was merged into the newly established CCP East China Bureau. On 20 March 1949, the Shandong Branch was reestablished. In August 1954, the Shandong Provincial Committee was formally established.

== Organization ==
The organization of the Shandong Provincial Committee includes:

- General Office

=== Functional Departments ===
- Organization Department
- Publicity Department
- United Front Work Department
- Political and Legal Affairs Commission

=== Offices ===
- Policy Research Office
- Office of the National Security Commission
- Office of the Cyberspace Affairs Commission
- Office of the Financial and Economic Affairs Commission
- Office of the Institutional Organization Commission
- Office of the Military-civilian Fusion Development Committee
- Taiwan, Hong Kong and Macao Affairs Office
- Office of the Inspection Leading Group
- Bureau of Veteran Cadres

=== Dispatched institutions ===
- Working Committee of the Organs Directly Affiliated to the Shandong Provincial Committee
- Jinan New and Old Kinetic Energy Conversion Starting Area Working Committee

=== Organizations directly under the Committee ===
- Shandong Party School
- Shandong Institute of Socialism
- Dazhong Daily
- Party History Research Office
- Shandong Provincial Archives

== Leadership ==
=== Party Committees ===
11th Provincial Party Committee (May 2017–June 2022)

- Secretary: Liu Jiayi (until 30 September 2021), Li Ganjie (from 30 September 2021)
- Deputy Secretaries: Gong Zheng (until March 2020), Wang Wentao (until March 2018), Yang Dongqi (from August 2018), Li Ganjie (April 2020–September 2021), Zhou Naixiang (from September 2021)
- Standing Committee members: Liu Jiayi (until 30 September 2021), Gong Zheng (until March 2020), Wang Wentao (until March 2018), Li Qun (until March 2018), Sun Shougang (until November 2017), Yang Dongqi, Zhang Jiangting (until April 2022), Chen Zhuankuan (until November 2021), Hu Wenrong (until September 2017), Xing Shanping (until January 2019), Lin Fenghai, Wang Hao (until December 2017), Wang Qingxian (November 2017–January 2021), Zhao Jilu (January 2018–August 2019), Guan Zhiou (March 2018–May 2020), Wang Zhonglin (May 2018–February 2020), Wang Ke (August 2018–July 2021), Sun Licheng (from April 2019), Wang Shujian (from April 2019), Qiu Yuechao (from January 2020), Li Ganjie (from April 2020), Liu Qiang (from May 2020), Yu Jie (July 2020–June 2021), Bai Yuguang (from July 2021), Lu Zhiyuan (from September 2021), Wang Yuyan (September 2021–), Zhou Naixiang (from September 2021), Xia Hongmin (from November 2021), Xu Hairong (from April 2022)

12th Provincial Party Committee (June 2022–)

- Secretary: Li Ganjie (until 29 December 2022), Lin Wu (from 29 December 2022)
- Deputy Secretaries: Zhou Naixiang, Lu Zhiyuan (until October 2023)
- Standing Committee members: Li Ganjie (until 29 December 2022), Zhou Naixiang, Lu Zhiyuan (until October 2023), Xu Hairong, Xia Hongmin, Bai Yugang, Wang Yuyan, Liu Qiang, Fu Mingxian (until September 2022), Zeng Zanrong, Li Meng (until March 2024), Wang Aiguo, Zhang Haibo, Jiang Cheng (from December 2022), Lin Wu (from 29 December 2022), Fan Bo (from April 2024)
