= Wang Xiaoyu =

Chinese politician

Wang Xiaoyu (Chinese: 王效禹) (1914–1995) was a Chinese politician. He was born in Yidu County, Shandong Province (currently Qingzhou, Weifang, Shandong Province). He was Chinese Communist Party Committee Secretary and governor of his home province.
