= Li Zhen (Shandong politician) =

Chinese politician (1924–2018)

Li Zhen (Chinese: 李振; July 1924 – 7 April 2018) was a Chinese politician who served as Executive Vice Governor of Shandong Province and Chairman of the Shandong People's Congress.

== Biography ==
Li was born in July 1924 in Anqiu, Shandong Province. He joined the Chinese Communist Party in June 1939, during the Second Sino-Japanese War, and served in various party and military positions in Shandong. After the founding of the People's Republic of China, he served as Deputy Party Secretary of Jiaozhou Prefecture, Party Secretary of Dezhou Prefecture, Deputy Party Secretary of Shandong Province, Vice Governor and then Executive Vice Governor of Shandong. He then served as Chairman of the 6th, 7th, and 8th Shandong People's Congress, until his retirement in February 1998.

Li was a member of the 12th and 14th National Congress of the Chinese Communist Party, and a member of the 6th, 7th, and 8th National People's Congress.

Li died on 7 April 2018 in Jinan, Shandong, at the age of 93.
