= Zhou Naixiang =

Chinese political figure and state-owned enterprise executive

- 周乃翔
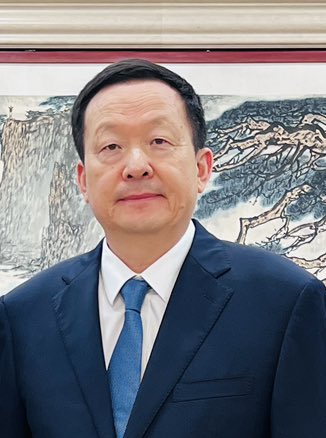
- Zhou in 2024

Governor of Shandong
- Incumbent
- Assumed office 30 September 2021
- Preceded by: Li Ganjie

Chairman of China Construction Group Co., Ltd.
- In office September 2019 – September 2021
- Preceded by: Guan Qing
- Succeeded by: Zheng Xuexuan

Party Secretary of Suzhou
- In office February 2012 – January 2016
- Preceded by: Shi Taifeng
- Succeeded by: Lan Shaomin

Personal details
- Born: December 1961 (age 64) Yixing, Jiangsu, China
- Party: Chinese Communist Party
- Education: Nanjing University of Technology

Zhou Naixiang (Chinese: 周乃翔; pinyin: Zhōu Nǎixiáng; born December 1961) is a Chinese political figure and state-owned enterprise executive, who formerly served as the chairman of China State Construction Engineering. He is currently serving as the governor of Shandong.

== Biography ==
Zhou was born in Yixing, Jiangsu. He graduated with a vocational degree from Nanjing University of Technology and later became a senior engineer. In 1982, after graduating, Zhou joined the Jiangsu Construction Engineering Company, where he was a construction worker, translator, then technician. He joined the Chinese Communist Party in December 1987. He went on to the company's branch in Shanghai, where he ascended through the management ranks. He also worked for the company as a member of the senior management team in the United States.

In July 2003, he became vice mayor of Taizhou, Jiangsu, then joined the municipal Party Standing Committee in 2006. In 2008, he was named head of the Jiangsu department of tourism. In October 2010, he was named deputy head of the Jiangsu department of Urban Development and Housing (江苏省住房和城乡建设厅). In February 2012, he was named acting mayor of Suzhou, confirmed four months later. In January 2016, he was named party chief of Suzhou, succeeding Shi Taifeng, who had been promoted to provincial governor.

In September 2019, he was appointed the Chairman of China State Construction Engineering.

In September 2021, he was appointed the Governor of Shandong.

Government offices
Preceded by Yan Li	Mayor of Suzhou; 2012–2016	Succeeded by Qu Futian
Preceded by Li Ganjie	Governor of Shandong; 2021–	Incumbent
Party political offices
Preceded by Shi Taifeng	Party Secretary of Suzhou; 2016–2019	Succeeded by Lan Shaomin
Business positions
Preceded by Guan Qing	Chairman of China Construction Group Co., Ltd. 2019–2021	Succeeded by Zheng Xuexuan (郑学选)
