= Wang Chunying =

- 王春英

Governor of the Export–Import Bank of China
- Incumbent
- Assumed office 21 October 2024
- Chairman: Wu Fulin
- Preceded by: Ren Shengjun

Personal details
- Born: December 1969 (age 56) China
- Party: Chinese Communist Party
- Education: Jilin University; Renmin University of China; Saitama University

Wang Chunying (Chinese: 王春英; pinyin: Wáng Chūnyīng; born December 1969) is a Chinese politician and banker, currently serving as governor of the Export–Import Bank of China.

== Early life and education ==
Wang was born in December 1969, and graduated from Jilin University. She earned a master's degree in the science of policy-making from Saitama University in 2000 and a master's degree in world economy from the Renmin University of China in 2001.

== Career ==
After university in 1992, Wang was despatched to the State Administration of Foreign Exchange. In December 2008, she became deputy director of the International Balance of Payments Department, rising to director in February 2016. She eventually became vice chairperson of the State Administration of Foreign Exchange in June 2020.

Wang was transferred to the Export–Import Bank of China on 28 August 2024 and appointed deputy party secretary. On October 21, she was chosen as vice chairwoman and governor of the bank.

Business positions
Preceded by Ren Shengjun	Governor of the Export–Import Bank of China; 2024–present	Incumbent
