= Yi Gang =

Chinese economist (born 1958)

- 易纲
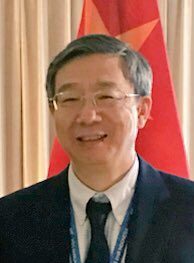
- Yi in 2018

12th Governor of the People's Bank of China
- In office 19 March 2018 – 25 July 2023
- Premier: Li Keqiang (2018–2023); Li Qiang (2023)
- Party secretary: Guo Shuqing; Pan Gongsheng
- Preceded by: Zhou Xiaochuan
- Succeeded by: Pan Gongsheng

Deputy Governor of the People's Bank of China
- In office 23 December 2007 – 19 March 2018
- Governor: Zhou Xiaochuan

Director of the State Administration of Foreign Exchange
- In office 17 July 2009 – 12 January 2016
- Premier: Wen Jiabao; Li Keqiang
- Preceded by: Hu Xiaolian
- Succeeded by: Pan Gongsheng

Personal details
- Born: 5 March 1958 (age 68) Beijing, China
- Party: Chinese Communist Party
- Education: Peking University (UG); Hamline University (no degree); University of Illinois Urbana–Champaign (PhD)
- Occupation: Economist

Yi Gang (Chinese: 易纲; pinyin: Yì Gāng) (born 5 March 1958) is a Chinese economist who served as the governor of the People's Bank of China from 2018 to 2023, vice governor of the People's Bank of China from 2007 to 2018, director of the State Administration of Foreign Exchange from 2009 to 2015, and assistant governor of the People's Bank of China from 2004 to 2007.

== Biography ==
Yi Gang was born in Beijing, March 5, 1958. He studied at Beijing University, Hamline University in Saint Paul, Minnesota, and obtained his Ph.D. in Economics from the University of Illinois Urbana–Champaign, with a dissertation on statistical model selection methods. He became an Associate Professor with tenure at Indiana University–Purdue University Indianapolis and then joined the faculty of Peking University as professor, deputy director of the Center for Economics Research, and Ph.D. advisor in Economics. He went to the People's Bank of China in 1997 and then successively served as Deputy Secretary-General and Secretary-General of the Monetary Policy Committee, Deputy Director-General and Director-General of the Monetary Policy Department, and Assistant Governor, as well as President of the Operations Office from September 2006 to October 2007. In December 2007, he was appointed Deputy Governor of the People's Bank of China. From 2009, he served as Director of the State Administration of Foreign Exchange (SAFE) until January 12, 2016. On April 18, 2012, Indiana University president Michael A. McRobbie conferred an honorary doctorate of humane letters upon Yi Gang, who served as assistant professor and associate professor of economics at IUPUI from 1986 to 1994.

Yi has published more than 40 articles in Chinese and 20 academic papers in English that have appeared in economics journals such as the Journal of Econometrics, the China Economic Review, and Comparative Economic Studies. Yi is the author of ten books, and he served as a consultant for the Scandinavian Journal of Statistics, the Journal of Econometrics, China Economic Review, Comparative Economic Studies, Economic Theory, Contemporary Policy Issues, and the Journal of Asian Economics. He also serves on the editorial board of the China Economic Review and the Journal of Asian Economics.

In October 2016, Yi helped represent China at the semi-annual meetings of the IMF and the World Bank in Washington, D.C., including on a panel with Bank of England governor Mark Carney. The meetings came as the yuan was for the first time being included in the IMF's international basket of currencies known as special drawing rights. Questions about Chinese debt levels, steel production and housing production were among those addressed in the meetings.

In October 2017, at the 19th National Congress of the Chinese Communist Party, he was elected as an alternate of the 19th Central Committee of the Chinese Communist Party. From March 2018 to July 2023, Yi served as the governor of the People's Bank of China. In July 2018, he was named Vice Chair of the Financial Stability and Development Committee. He is also an adviser to the China Finance 40 Forum (CF40). On 1 November 2025, he stepped down as the vice chairman of the Committee for Economic Affairs of the National Committee Chinese People's Political Consultative Conference. Sing Tao Daily reported that Yi's removal was part of a broader crackdown against naked officials, CCP cadre with family abroad, as Yi is thought to have a son in the United States.

Government offices
Preceded by Hu Xiaolian	Director of the State Administration of Foreign Exchange; 2009–2016	Succeeded by Pan Gongsheng
Preceded by Zhou Xiaochuan	Governor of the People's Bank of China; 2018–2023	Succeeded by Pan Gongsheng
