= Special Loan Program for China-Latin America Infrastructure Project =

The Special Loan Program for China-Latin America Infrastructure Project (Chinese: 中拉基础设施专项贷款) was a credit line of US$20 billion established by the Government of China for the financing of infrastructure projects in Latin America. The program was launched during the inaugural China-CELAC Forum in 2015 with a pledge to create "special loans for Chinese-Latin American infrastructure".

The program was administered by the China Development Bank with capital contributions from the State Administration of Foreign Exchange. Following President Xi Jinping’s July 2014 Latin America tour the program was formally launched in January 2015 during the first China–CELAC Ministerial Forum in Beijing. The initiative sought to address Latin America’s estimated US$150 billion annual infrastructure financing gap, as calculated by the Inter-American Development Bank.

At the time, the commitment represented China’s largest single infrastructure financing initiative in the region, extending from more than a decade of Chinese development lending that had begun in 2005. The fund was considered as a potential source of financing for several large-scale projects, including the Bolivian segment of the planned Central Bi-Oceanic railway. Bolivian officials actively promoted the use of the program for this project in 2016.

In May 2025, at the Fourth China–CELAC Summit, China announced a new credit line of US$9.2 billion for Latin American development projects.

== See also ==
- Economy of Latin America and the Caribbean
