= Xie Zifen =

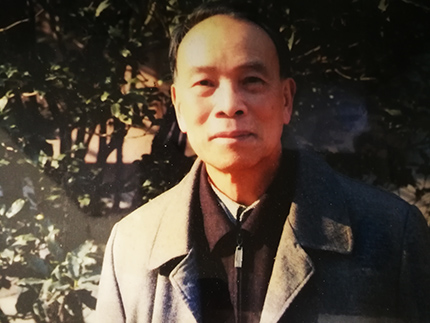
Xie Zifen

Xie Zifen (simplified Chinese: 谢自奋; traditional Chinese: 謝自奮; pinyin: Xiè Zìfèn; born November 1934 in Meizhou, Guangdong) is a retired Chinese rural economist and senior research fellow with the Shanghai Academy of Social Sciences (SASS).

Xie has been devoted to rural economics and regional economics research since his graduation in 1959 from the Financial and Monetary Department of the Shanghai Academy of Social Sciences (SASS). He has long been engaged in research on topics including rural modernization and small and medium-sized industries.

He served as director of the Institute of National Economy under SASS and concurrently as an expert consultant for the Shanghai municipal government, member of the Academic Committee of SASS, vice chairman of the Shanghai Rural Economics Association and vice chairman of the Shanghai Rural Finance Association.

Since China's reform and opening up at the end of 1978, Xie has done in-depth research on many practical and theoretical problems in the field of rural economy. He has been the chief editor of 12 books and also the author or co-author of hundreds of academic papers and research reports.

== Major works ==
- Prospects for Urban-Rural Integration (Editor-in-Chief, Shanghai Academy of Social Sciences Press, 1987)
- Regional Economic Research (Editor-in-Chief, Shanghai Academy of Social Sciences Press, 1988)
- A Research on the Economic, Scientific and Technological Development Strategy and Policy Issues of Shanghai's Township Enterprises (Editor-in-Chief, Shanghai Academy of Social Sciences Press, 1988)
- The Road to Getting Rich for 800 Million Farmers (Editor-in-Chief, Shanghai People's Publishing House, 1982)
- A Research on the Comprehensive Development and Planning of Land in the North Shore of Hangzhou Bay ( Editor-in-Chief, Shanghai Popular Science Press, 1991)
- Shanghai Agricultural Mechanization Development Strategy" (Editor-in-Chief, Shanghai Popular Science Press, 1991)
- Theory and Practice of China's County-Level Economic Development (Editor-in-Chief, Shanghai Academy of Social Sciences Press, 1996)

== Awards ==
Because of remarkable achievements in scientific research, Xie Zifen was awarded the title of advanced supporter of rural scientific and technological work in Shanghai in 1987. He was awarded the title of young and middle-aged expert with outstanding contributions by China's Ministry of Personnel in 1990. Since 1992, he has received special government allowance approved by the State Council, China's cabinet.

More than 10 research projects that Xie Zifen participated in have been commended at provincial, municipal and academy-levels for their outstanding achievements, including:

- "The Past and Present of Fengyang Rural Areas" (winning the Outstanding Scientific Research Achievement Award of SASS),
- "A Comprehensive Survey of Coastal Zones and Tidal Flat Resources in Shanghai" (winning the first prize of Shanghai Science and Technology Progress Award),
- "Research Report on Strategic Planning of the Economic, Scientific, Technological and Social Development of Chongming Island" (acquiring second class prize of Shanghai Science and Technology Progress),
- "A Study of the Industrial Structure Adjustment in the Suburbs of Shanghai" (winning the third prize of Shanghai Science and Technology Progress Award),
- "A Study on the Choice of Agricultural Technology in Shanghai in the 1990s and Its Countermeasures" (acquiring the Second Prize for Outstanding Philosophical and Scientific Achievements in Shanghai),
- "A Research on Operational Mechanism of Township Enterprises" (winning the Special Prize for Outstanding Achievements of SASS).
