= Weightlifting at the 1965 National Games of China =

Weightlifting was part of the 1965 National Games of China held in Beijing. Only men competed in seven bodyweight categories which mostly mirrored the international standard at the time. In 1965 the Chinese Weightlifting Association was not yet a member federation of the IWF.

The competition program at the National Games mirrors that of the Olympic Games as only medals for the total achieved are awarded, but not for individual lifts in either the snatch or clean and jerk. Likewise an athlete failing to register a snatch result cannot advance to the clean and jerk.

== Medal summary ==
=== Men ===
Event	Gold		Silver		Bronze	
56 kg	Ye Haobo; Guangdong	345 kg	Li Jiyuan; PLA	342.5 kg	Dong Huatian; Jiangsu	335 kg
60 kg	Ji Fayuan; Hubei	372.5 kg	Zhang Zonggui; Jiangsu	347.5 kg	Zhu Chuqiang; Hunan	345 kg
67.5 kg	Deng Guoyin; Sichuan	400 kg	Chen Zhengye; PLA	392.5 kg	Liu Huaiyou; Henan	390 kg
75 kg	Cen Aqi; Shanghai	412.5 kg	Zhang Yuancang; Hebei	400 kg	Yuan Jiazhi; Hunan	397.5 kg
82.5 kg	Qian Yukai; Xinjiang	455 kg	Yang Tangxian; Hubei	425 kg	Zheng Kunlong; Hebei	405 kg
90 kg	Wu Guanxi; PLA	442.5 kg	Xie Yanfa; PLA	437.5 kg	Weng Qinhua; Guangxi	435 kg
100 kg	Peng Guangzhu; Hebei	477.5 kg	Wang Lijun; Hebei	457.5 kg	Wu Fulin; PLA	450 kg

== Medal table ==
Rank	Delegation	Gold	Silver	Bronze	Total
1	People's Liberation Army	1	3	1	5
2	Hebei	1	2	1	4
3	Hubei	1	1	0	2
4	Guangdong	1	0	0	1
4	Shanghai	1	0	0	1
4	Sichuan	1	0	0	1
4	Xinjiang	1	0	0	1
8	Jiangsu	0	1	1	2
9	Hunan	0	0	2	2
10	Guangxi	0	0	1	1
10	Henan	0	0	1	1
Totals (11 entries)		7	7	7	21
