= SAFE Investment Company =

Chinese Sovereign wealth fund

SAFE Investment Company Limited
- Native name: 中國華安投資有限公司
- Type: Sovereign wealth fund
- Industry: Investment management
- Founded: June 1997; 29 years ago
- Headquarters: AIA Central, Hong Kong
- Key people: Cheng Hao (Director)
- AUM: US$2.047 trillion (2026)
- Parent: State Administration of Foreign Exchange

SAFE Investment Company Limited (SAFE Investment; Chinese: 中國華安投資有限公司) is a Chinese sovereign wealth fund based in Hong Kong. As of September 2026, its total assets under management reached $2.047 trillion.

It is a subsidiary of the State Administration of Foreign Exchange (SAFE) and manages one third of China's foreign exchange reserves.

== History ==
SAFE established four offshore investment offices in Hong Kong, Singapore, London and New York known as the 'four golden flowers'. SAFE Investment was set up one month before the Handover of Hong Kong in July 1997 with a registered capital of HKD 100 million. It was set up to "support and promote the development of Hong Kong’s financial market" as well as defend the value of the Renminbi and Hong Kong dollar's peg to the US dollar against international speculators. The name of SAFE Investment in Chinese signifies the wish for the nation's security.

Following the 1997 Asian financial crisis, SAFE Investment served largely as a minor outpost for Safe with only about $20 billion in assets under management (AUM). However SAFE Investment gradually increased its AUM and took more risk in managing reserves compared to its peers in other countries. SAFE Investment was delegated to manage foreign exchange reserves as well as invest in wide a range of financial instruments. SAFE Investment was assigned as the primary entity to invest in offshore equities. Despite SAFE Investment's large scale of investments, it has a low and secretive profile with few knowing about it.

In 2008, SAFE Investment was one of the largest customers for local Treasury bond trading desks at banks such as Morgan Stanley. SAFE Investment attracted attention due to a series of high-profile investments. In January, it was reported that had acquired small equity stakes in Australian banks ANZ, Commonwealth Bank and National Australia Bank. The acquisition raised new questions over the transparency of the investment as well as speculation that the Chinese were in the market to take more major stakes in overseas banks.

In March 2009, it was reported that SAFE Investment had invested in British companies such as Rio Tinto, Royal Dutch Shell, BP, Barclays, Tesco and RBS in the previous year. Due to the Great Recession, billions were lost as a result of the markets collapsing.

In January 2025, People's Bank of China governor Pan Gongsheng said the central bank would 'significantly increase' the allocation of the nation's reserves to Hong Kong. This led to speculation that SAFE Investment could potentially be managing more of China's reserves in the future.
