= China Finance 40 Forum =

Economic and financial policy think tank in Beijing, China

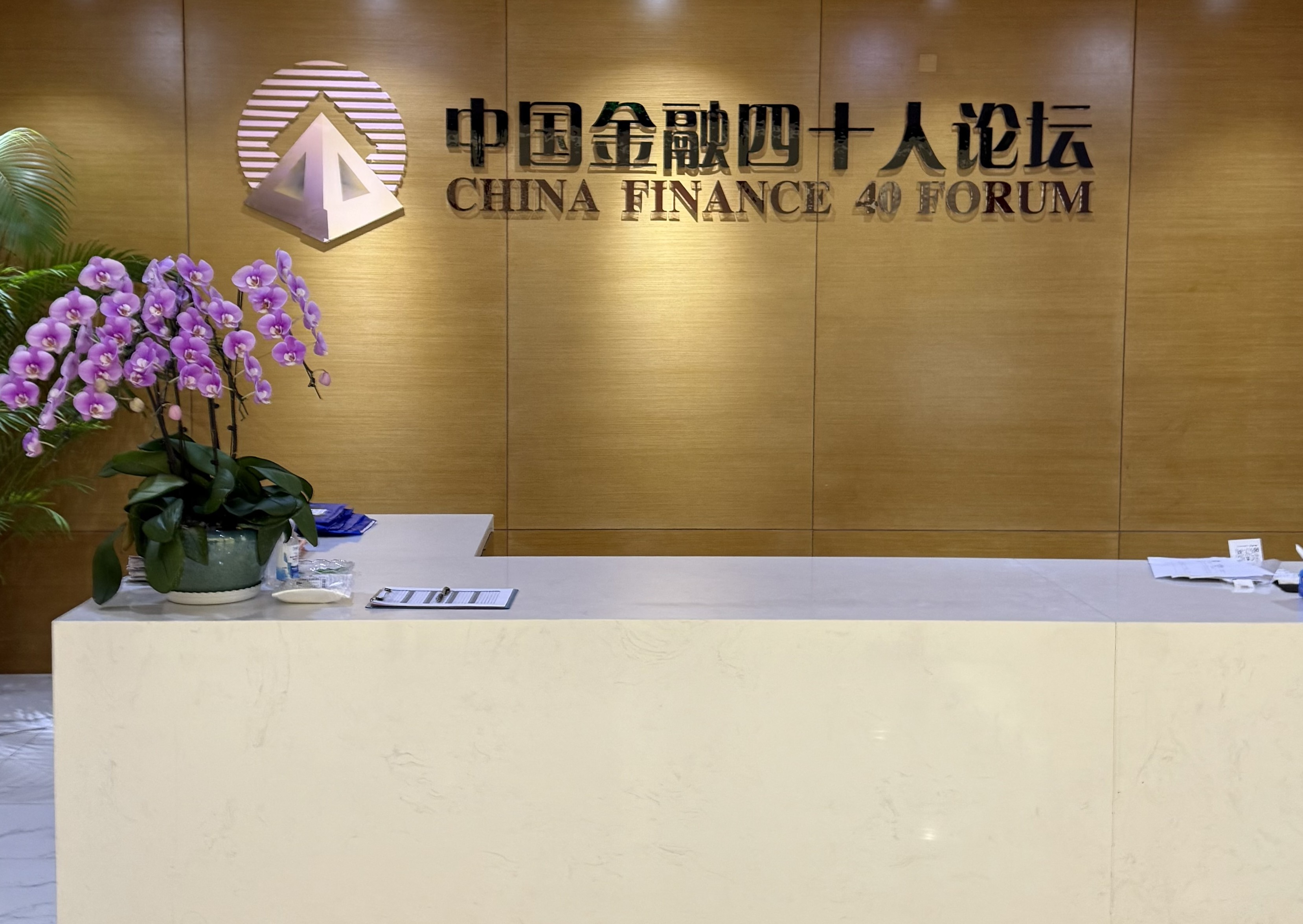
- Entrance of CF40 head office in Beijing
- Abbreviation: CF40
- Formation: 2008
- Type: Economic and financial policy think tank
- Location: Beijing
- Founding chairman: Chen Yuan
- President: Wang Haiming
- Website: www.cf40.org.cn

The China Finance 40 Forum or CF40 is a Chinese think tank created in 2008 which specializes on issues of economic and financial policy.

In January 2021, the University of Pennsylvania's Think Tanks and Civil Societies Program ranked CF40 as #8 top think tank in China, and #31 among think tanks in China, India, Japan and the Republic of Korea.

== History and development ==
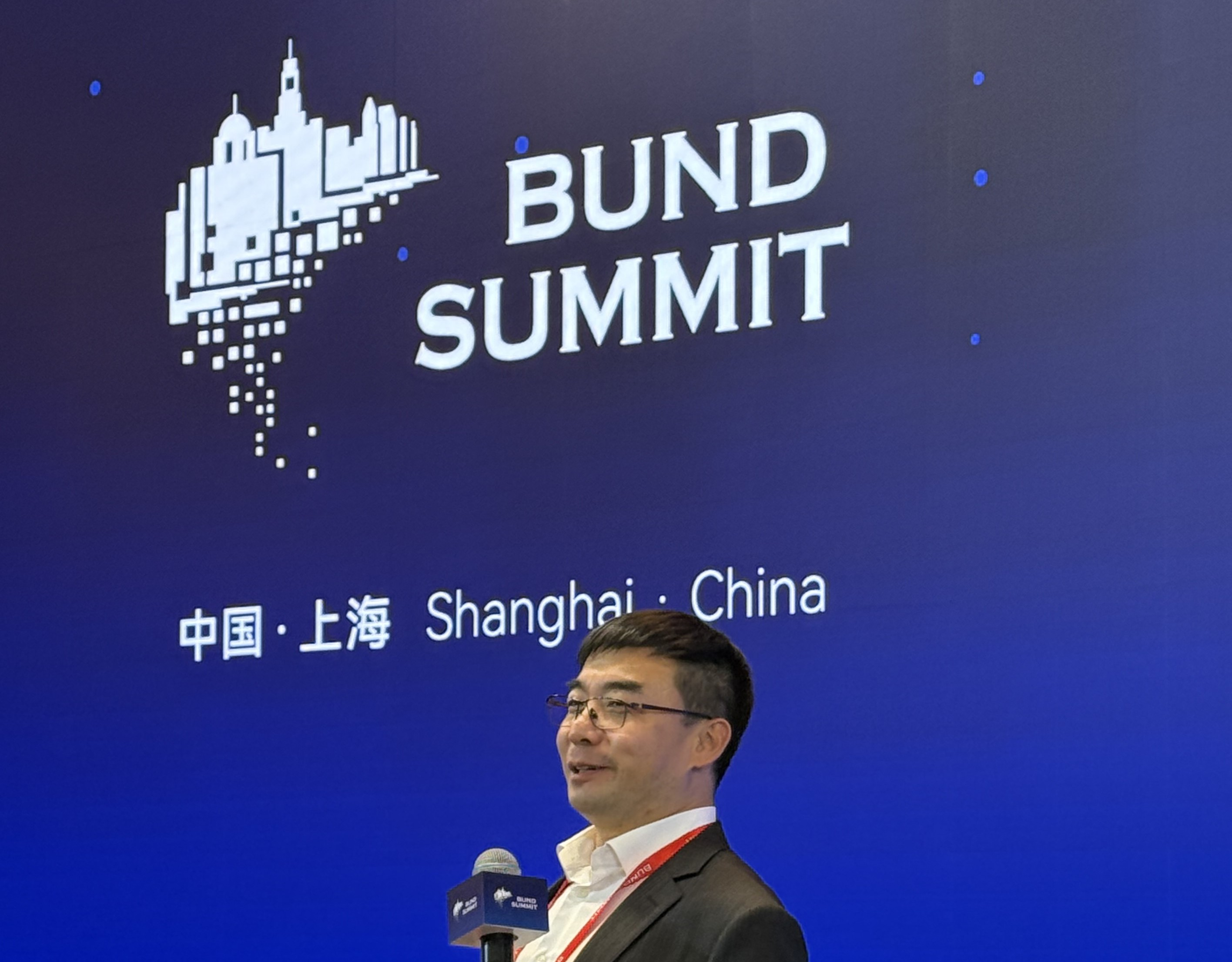
CF40 President Wang Haiming at the Bund Summit in Shanghai, 2025

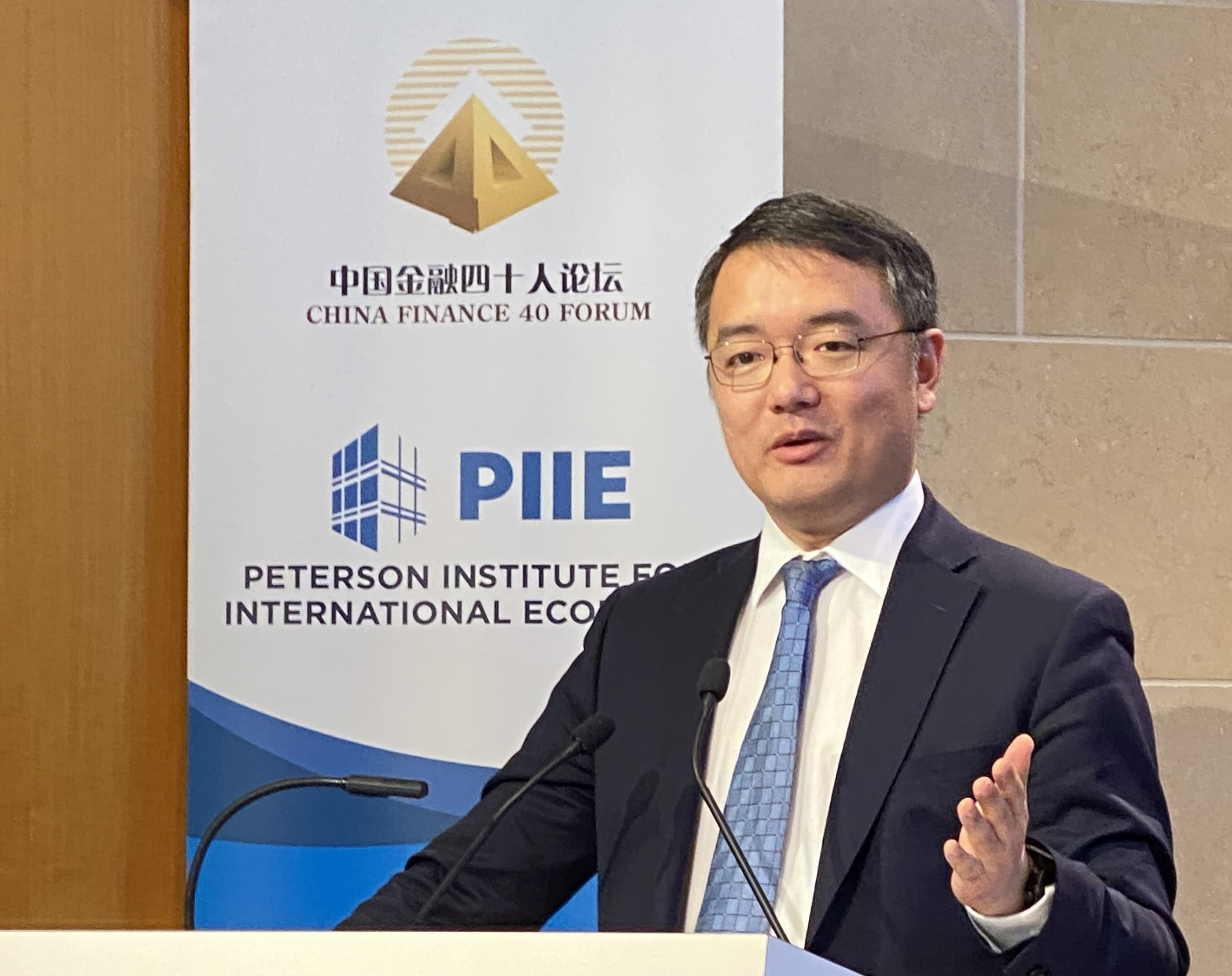
Guo Kai, Executive President of the CF40 Institute, at a joint event with PIIE in Washington DC, 2024

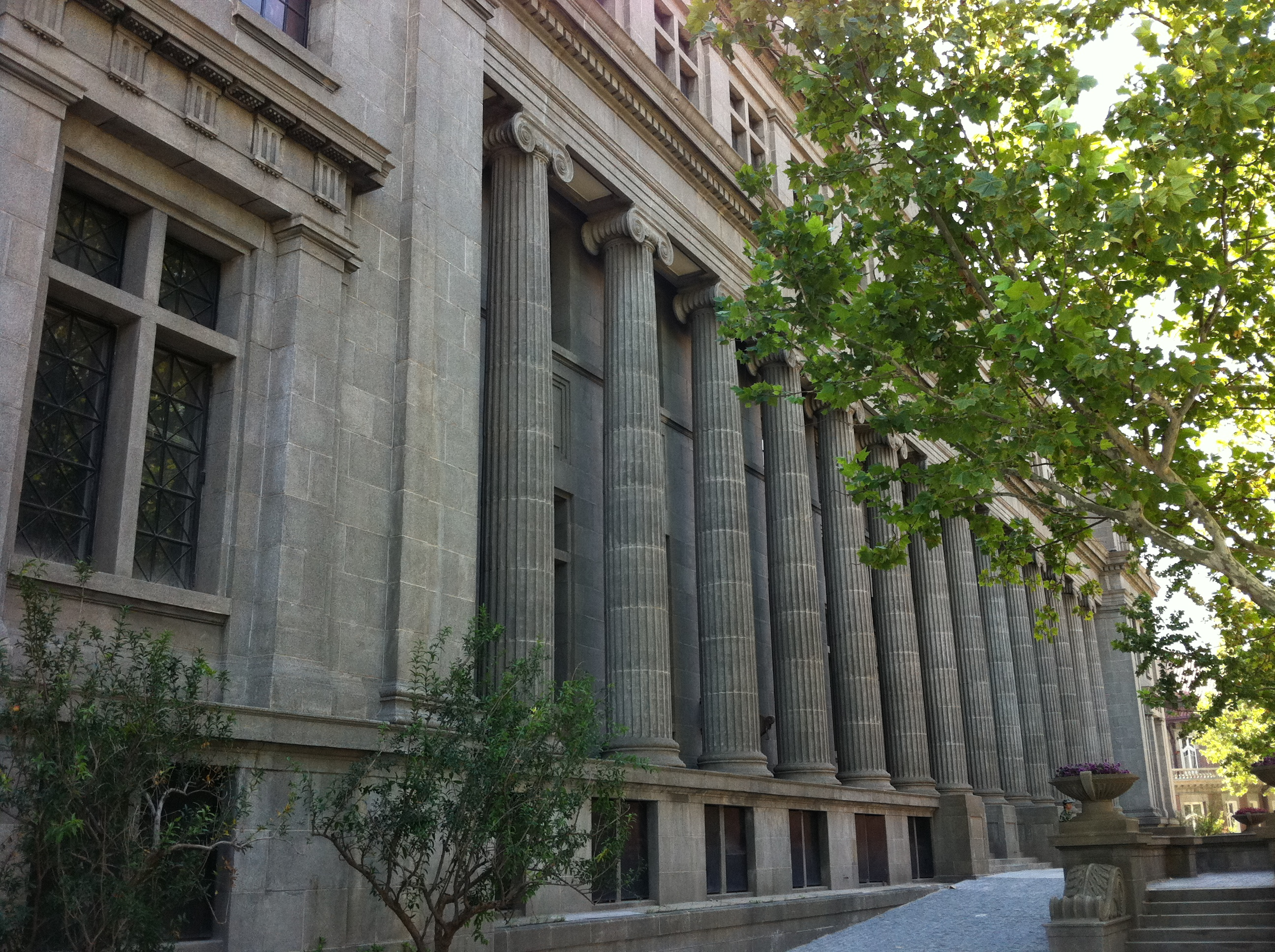
Former building of the Chinese Engineering and Mining Company in Tianjin, seat of the Northern Finance Institute

CF40 was created on 12 April 2008 as a club of 40 finance experts under 40 years of age, thus its name. It was founded and developed by Wang Haiming, previously a journalist and chief editor at 21st Century Business Herald. Chen Yuan was its founding chairman.

CF40 is based in Beijing. It has also created the Shanghai Finance Institute (SFI) in Shanghai and the Northern Finance Institute (NFI) in Tianjin, in 2011 and 2016 respectively. Both these institutes have had Wang Haiming as their Executive President from their creation.

CF40 organizes events and conferences, alone or in partnership with other think tanks that have included Bruegel the Euro 50 Group, and the Peterson Institute for International Economics (PIIE).

CF40 publishes studies and a periodical journal, China Finance Review. Its yearly Jingshan Report is a reference publication on China's financial system.

== CF40-affiliated experts ==
As of early 2021, CF40 advisers included Chen Yulu, Hu Huaibang, Hu Xiaolian, Huang Qifan, Jiang Chaoliang, Jiang Jianqing, Lin Yifu (Justin Lin), Qin Xiao, Wu Jinglian, Wu Xiaoling, Yi Gang, Yu Yongding, and Zhu Min.

Also as of early 2021, CF40's Academic Committee was chaired by Qian Yingyi and its members include Huang Yiping and Pan Gongsheng. Jin Keyu was an academic member in 2024. By late 2024, the chair of the CF40 Academic Committee was Cai Fang, and its other members were Bai Chong'en, Gao Shanwen, Long Guoqiang, and Zhu Jun.

In 2021, CF40's resident Senior Fellows included Guan Tao, and its nonresident Senior Fellows included Xiao Gang, Zhang Bin, and Zhang Xiaohui. By 2023, Dr Guo Kai was also CF40 Senior Fellow. By 2025, Guo Kai was the Executive President of the CF40 Institute.

== Bund Summit ==
The Bund Summit is a flagship event co-organized every year since 2019 by CF40 in Shanghai, named after the Bund. The 2020 Bund Summit was the venue for Jack Ma's speech on financial regulation in China which has been widely associated with the suspension of Ant Group's initial public offering.

== See also ==
- Center for China and Globalization
- China Center for International Economic Exchanges
- Chinese Academy of Social Sciences
- Shanghai Development Research Foundation
- Unirule Institute of Economics
