= Shanghai Development Research Foundation =

Chinese think tank

The Shanghai Development Research Foundation (SDRF, Chinese: 上海发展研究基金会) is a Chinese think tank, based in Shanghai and founded in 1993. Its stated purpose is to promote research on the issues of development.

== Overview ==
The SDRF was established in the context of China's reform and opening up process, at the time when Pudong started being developed as a financial hub. The blueprint for it was submitted in early 1993 jointly by the research office of the Shanghai Municipal People's Government and the Shanghai Economic Research Center. The SDRF was effectively established at a conference held on 3 June 1993, with Zhuang Xiaotian as its first chairman.

In 2004, the SDRF was re-registered as a non-profit private institution under new Chinese legislation on the management of foundations. Sha Lin succeeded Zhuang Xiaotian as chairman from 2005 to 2013. Hu Yanzhao was president from 2013 to 2019. As of 2025, Tu Guangshao was the SDRF's honorary chairman. Qiao Yide, a former managing director of New York Life Insurance Company for China from 1995 to 2003, was the institute's vice chairman and secretary-general.

SDRF has co-organized international events jointly with the Friedrich Ebert Foundation, Institute for New Economic Thinking, and Peterson Institute for International Economics among others.

== See also ==
- Shanghai Academy of Social Sciences
- China Finance 40 Forum
