= Zhu Min (economist) =

Chinese economist

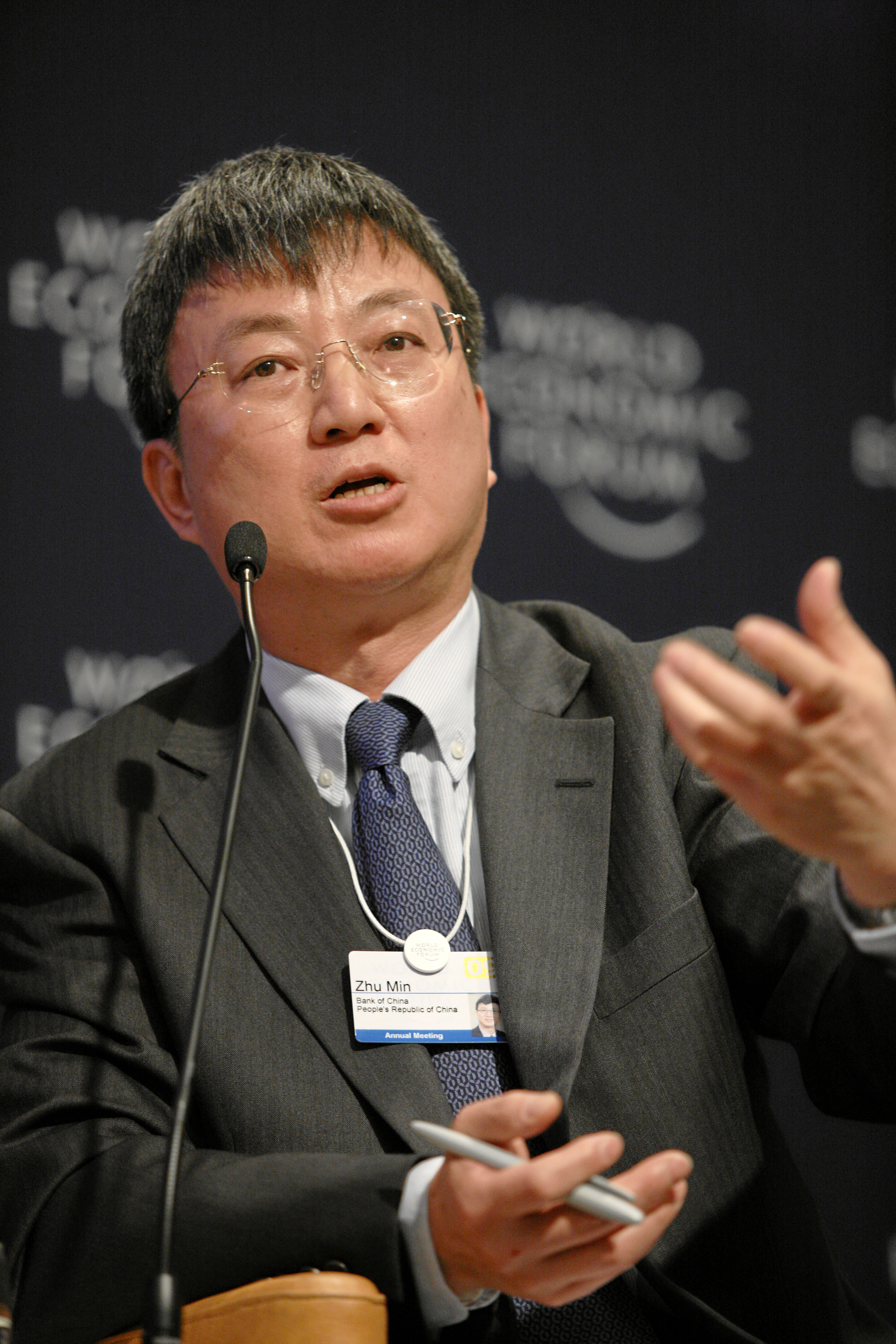
- Zhu in 2009
- Born: 1952 (age 73–74)
- Education: Fudan University; Princeton University (M.P.A.); Johns Hopkins University (M.A., Ph.D.)
- Occupations: Economist, Deputy MD of IMF

Zhu Min (Chinese: 朱民; pinyin: Zhū Mín; born 1952) is a Chinese economist and was deputy managing director of the International Monetary Fund. He was the inaugural special advisor to the managing director. Zhu has held senior positions at the Bank of China from 2003 to 2009 and was a deputy governor of the People's Bank of China from 2009 to 2010.

He has published extensively on a wide range of macroeconomic management, financial regulation and supervision, and financial market issues. He is a guest lecturer at several university graduate schools, and a frequent speaker at major global economic forums.

== Education ==
Zhu Min was born in Shanghai, China, in 1952. He graduated from Fudan University with a bachelor's degree in economics in 1982, and gained a master's degree in M.P.A. from the Woodrow Wilson School of Public and International Affairs at Princeton University and a Ph.D. in economics and an M.A. in economics from Johns Hopkins University.

== Career ==
Zhu worked at the World Bank as an economist for six years from 1990 to 1996, and taught economics at both Johns Hopkins University and Fudan University. From 1995 to 1996, he worked as a chief technical advisor for China's Agenda 21 at the United Nations Development Program. Zhu then held various positions at the Bank of China starting in 1996, eventually rising to become group executive vice president, responsible for finance and treasury, risk management, internal control, legal and compliance, and strategy and research. In 2009, he became a deputy governor of the People's Bank of China and was responsible for international affairs, policy research, and credit information. Additionally, Zhu serves as vice chairman to the China Institute for Innovation and Development Strategy. Zhu is a member of the Board of Trustees of the World Economic Forum.

=== International Monetary Fund ===
On February 24, 2010, Zhu was appointed as special advisor to managing director of the International Monetary Fund (IMF) Dominique Strauss-Kahn, in a move to strengthen the IMF's understanding of Asia and the emerging economies and to promote sustainable growth and financial stability. Zhu assumed his position on May 3, 2010.

On July 26, 2011, Zhu assumed the position of deputy managing director of the International Monetary Fund.

Zhu thus become the third Chinese to take on a senior position in a top international financial institution after Shengman Zhang, former managing director of The World Bank and Justin Yifu Lin, former vice president and chief economist of The World Bank. After the 2008 financial crisis, China was expected to play a more important role in the international community and the IMF also stated that the organization called on giving more votes to China.

Zhu left his position as deputy managing director at the IMF in July 2016, at the conclusion of his five-year term.

From 2017 to 2022, Zhu chaired the National Institute of Financial Research at Tsinghua University. As of 2024, he was vice chairman of the China Center for International Economic Exchanges.

He is an adviser to the China Finance 40 Forum (CF40).

== Career timeline ==
- 2011–2016: Deputy managing director, International Monetary Fund
- 2010–2011: Special advisor to the managing director, International Monetary Fund
- 2009–2010: Deputy governor, People's Bank of China
- 2003–2009: Executive assistant president, Bank of China (Hong Kong) Limited
- 2002–2003: General manager, Bank of China (Hong Kong) Limited, Restructuring and Listing Office
- 2001–2002: General manager, Bank of China (Hong Kong) Limited
- 1998–2002: General manager, Institute of International Finance
- 1998–2002: Head, Bank of China (Hong Kong) Limited, Project Office; graduate, Johns Hopkins University US, Maryland, Baltimore (received doctorate)
- 1990–1996: Consultant, The World Bank; Graduate, Princeton University USA, New Jersey, Princeton (received master's degree)
- 1982: Graduate, Fudan University, Shanghai Municipality
