= Pierre Gadonneix =

French businessman (born 1943)

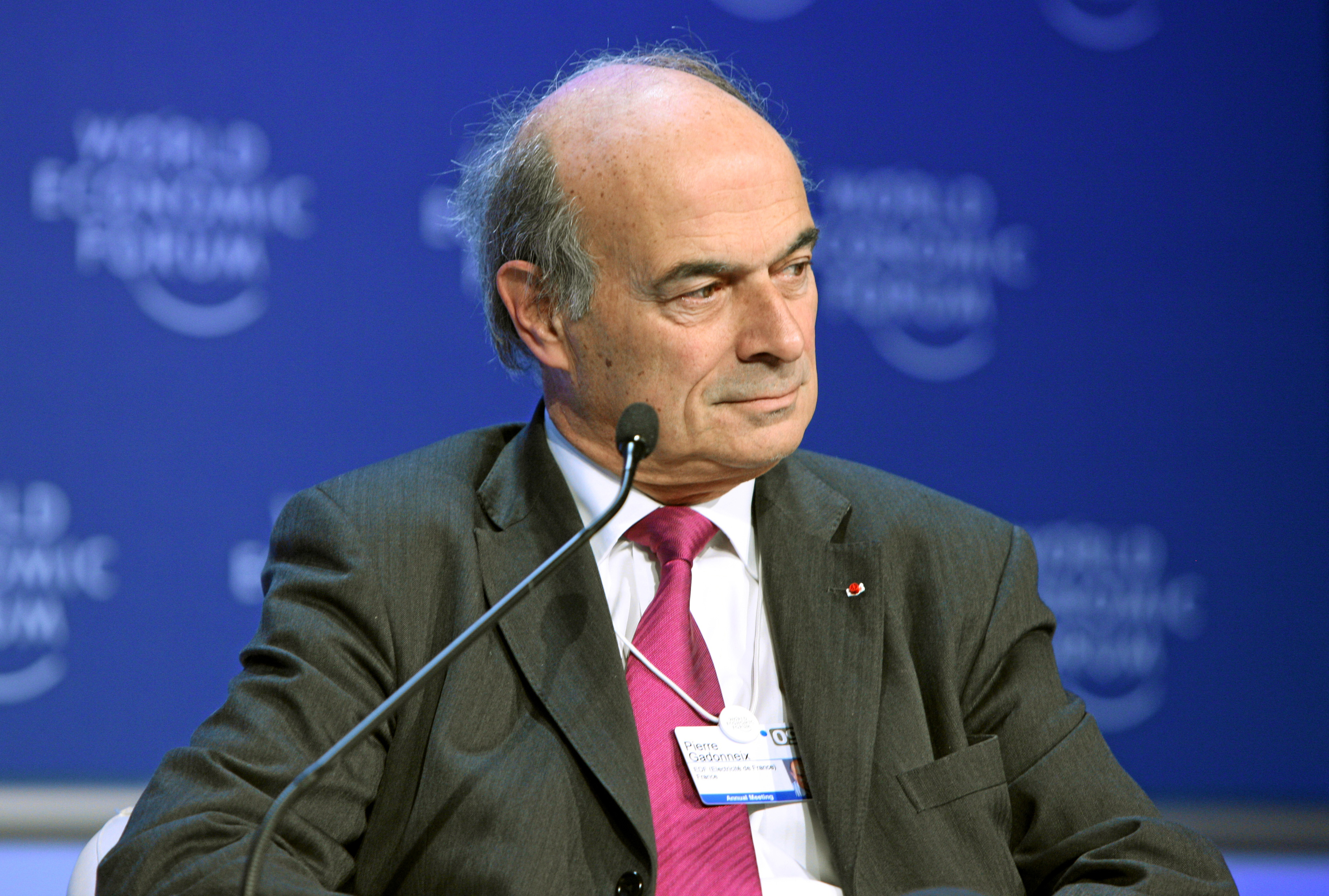
- Born: 10 January 1943 (age 83); New York City, United States
- Education: École Polytechnique, Harvard Business School
- Occupation: Chairman World Energy Council

Pierre Gadonneix (born 10 January 1943) is a French businessman; he was the chairman of the board and CEO of EDF from 2004 to 2009.

== Biography ==
Pierre Gadonneix, who has a doctorate in business economics from the Harvard Business School, is a graduate of the École Polytechnique (class of 1962) and of the École Nationale Supérieure du Pétrole et des Moteurs, and has a degree in economics.

From 1996 to 2004, Pierre Gadonneix was chairman and CEO of the Gaz de France group, after joining the company as CEO nine years earlier in 1987. He was reappointed chairman and CEO in 1999.

From 1978 to 1987, Pierre Gadonneix was director of Metallurgical, Engineering and Electrical Industries at the Ministry of Industry, where he contributed to the restructuring of the French steel industry.

In 1976, Pierre Gadonneix was appointed as technical advisor to the Minister of Industry and Research.

Before that, he worked as director of the Institut de Développement Industriel (IDI), the leading French investment trust specializing in SME's. He joined the institute in 1972, as project manager, later becoming department manager.

In 1969, Pierre Gadonneix established a computer service company, called SEFI, employing around fifty engineers. He managed the business for two years until its takeover by a major industrial group in 1972.

Pierre Gadonneix began his career in 1966 with the Elf Aquitaine Group, as an engineer in the computing department, and then at the commercial division of Aquitaine Organico.

Besides this, Pierre Gadonneix has other international responsibilities in the energy sector. In 2006, he was elected chairman of the World Energy Council which brings together the principal players of this sector in the world, for a three-year term from 2007 to 2010. He has been the European vice chairman of this organisation since 2004. From 1993 to 1999, he also chaired the Conseil Français de l’Energie (French energy council).

Pierre Gadonneix is a member of the Conseil Economique et Social (Economic and Social Council).

Being a member of the board of the Fondation Nationale des Sciences Politiques (National Foundation of Political Science), Pierre Gadonneix was also a member of the Boards of major industrial groups, notably: EDF (78/87), Elf-Erap (88/95), Usinor (82/87), Renault (78/87), SNCF (83/87) and France Telecom (98/03).

Pierre Gadonneix published a Doctoral Thesis at Harvard in 1975 under the title: "An attempt to meet the US challenge in the French computer industry". He also taught economics at the École Polytechnique for 10 years (from 1983 to 1992).

Pierre Gadonneix is a commander in the National Order of the Legion of Honour and Commander of the National Order of Merit and of the Order of Arts and Letters. He was born in New York on 10 January 1943, he is married and has got three children.

Business positions
Preceded by François Roussely	CEO of EDF; 2004–2009	Succeeded by Henri Proglio
