= François Roussely =

French government official and magistrate (1945–2023)

Secretary-General for the Administration of the Ministry of Armed Forces
- In office 10 July 1991 – 14 January 1997
- President: François Mitterrand; Jacques Chirac
- Preceded by: Yannick Moreau
- Succeeded by: Jean-François Hebert

Chief Executive Officer of the Direction générale de la Police nationale
- In office 31 May 1989 – 10 July 1991
- Preceded by: Ivan Barbot
- Succeeded by: Bernard Grasset

Personal details
- Born: 9 January 1945 Belvès, Dordogne, France
- Died: 11 January 2023 (aged 78) Égly, Essonne, France
- Party: Socialist Party
- Education: École nationale d'administration
- Occupation: Government official Magistrate

François Roussely (9 January 1945 – 11 January 2023) was a French government official and magistrate.

== Biography ==
After his studies at the École nationale d'administration, Roussely became an auditor in 1978 and subsequently became a referendum advisor at the Cour des Comptes in 1982 in the cabinet of Minister of the Interior Gaston Defferre. He held various positions in Defferre's successor, Pierre Joxe's cabinet as well, including his service as Chief Executive Officer of the Directorate General of National Police from 1989 to 1991 and as Secretary-General for the Administration of the Ministry of Armed Forces from 1991 to 1997. Additionally, he served on the nuclear energy committee of the French Atomic Energy Commission from 1991 to 1997 and was director of the civil and military cabinet of Defense Minister Alain Richard from 1997 to 1998.

From 1998 to 2004, Roussely was president of Électricité de France and was later CEO of Credit Suisse in France until 2009. He also served as Vice-President of Credit Suisse in Europe.

Roussely died on 11 January 2023, at the age of 78.

== Decorations ==
- Commander of the Legion of Honour (2012)

Business positions
Preceded by Edmond Alphandéry	CEO of EDF; 1998–2004	Succeeded by Pierre Gadonneix
