= Export–Import Bank of China =

Strategic state-owned bank

- Native name: 中国进出口银行
- Type: Public
- Industry: Banking
- Founded: 1994; 32 years ago
- Headquarters: Beijing, China
- Key people: Hu Xiaolian (chairwoman & Party Secretary); Wu Fulin (Deputy Party Secretary, vice chairman & president)
- Products: Financial services
- Website: www.eximbank.gov.cn

Export–Import Bank of China
- Simplified Chinese: 中国进出口银行
- Traditional Chinese: 中國進出口銀行
Transcriptions
Standard Mandarin
- Hanyu Pinyin: Zhōngguó Jìnchūkǒu Yínháng

The Export–Import Bank of China (中国进出口银行; commonly known as China Exim Bank or Exim Bank) is one of China's three major policy banks, operating under the authority of the State Council. Established in 1994, it was created to implement state policies in foreign trade, industrial development, overseas investment, and foreign aid, with a mandate to support the export of Chinese goods and services and the international expansion of Chinese firms.

== Role and mandate ==
China Exim Bank functions as an instrument of Chinese industrial, trade, and foreign economic policy. Together with China Development Bank and Sinosure, it supports government objectives by providing policy-directed finance rather than operating primarily on a commercial basis. Its core mandate is to facilitate Chinese exports and overseas projects by extending financing to foreign governments, state-owned enterprises, and private counterparties involved in transactions with Chinese firms.

Exim Bank creates coordinated credit spaces for commercial financiers and firms in China to participate as investors or service providers in areas like construction or logistics on funded projects abroad. This helps de-risk the projects for the commercial involvement.

== Operations ==
The bank's activities combine policy lending with large-scale commercial operations. Its principal instruments include export credits, buyers' credits, and investment loans, with a concentration in capital-intensive sectors such as transportation infrastructure, power generation, oil and gas pipelines, telecommunications, and water projects. China Exim Bank also provides financing to support Chinese companies establishing or expanding operations overseas, particularly in the energy, mining, and industrial sectors.

A distinct function of the bank is the administration of Chinese government concessional loans, which are extended at zero or below-market interest rates as part of China's foreign aid program. China Exim Bank is the sole institution authorized to issue and manage these concessional loans on behalf of the Chinese government.

Although the bank does not publish comprehensive data on its overseas loan portfolio, US officials have estimated that its export financing exceeds the combined total of export finance provided by the G7 countries. According to the Financial Times, China Exim Bank and China Development Bank together signed at least US$110 billion in loans to developing countries in 2009–2010, surpassing the lending volume of the World Bank over the same period.

== International development finance ==
China Exim Bank is a major source of financing for overseas development projects involving Chinese contractors and suppliers. Alongside China Development Bank and the Silk Road Fund, it is one of the principal financiers of projects associated with the Belt and Road Initiative (BRI), particularly in Africa and South and Southeast Asia.

The bank is a part of the Chinese foreign aid system and administers the Two Preferential Loan Program (两优贷款业务; liangyou). The concessional loan (优惠贷款) and preferential buyer's credit (优惠买方信贷) are the two main loan products under the preferential loan program. Exim Bank's Sovereign Business Loan Department manages these loans. These two types of loans are a major part of the financing support for the BRI.

For concessional loans the bank advances a no interest or very low interest rate loan to a developing country government or agency to build a project (e.g. power plant, road, water treatment facility). The term of the concession loan is up to 20 years and a maximum grace period of 7 years is given. The preferential export buyer's credit is provided to a foreign borrower to purchase Chinese goods or services (e.g. construction contractor building the project). Concessional loans are a form of foreign aid and subsidized by the Chinese government revenues. They are denominated in renminbi.

Preferential buyers' credits are denominated in U.S. dollars. Although their conditions are concessional, they are not subsidized by tax revenues. The preferential export buyer's credit is generally classified as a commercial loan rather than foreign aid even if the interest rate is very low because the purpose is to promote Chinese exports.

In 2014, China's sovereign investment apparatus contributed initial capital to the Silk Road Fund, with China Exim Bank subsequently acting as a complementary lender for BRI-related projects. The bank has also been involved in debt relief, refinancing, and restructuring discussions with several borrowing countries, particularly in the context of financial distress following the COVID-19 pandemic.

== International engagements ==
During the COVID-19 pandemic, China Exim Bank granted debt relief to the government of Angola, although the precise scale of the relief was not publicly disclosed. In 2022, the bank entered into an agreement with Hong Kong–based ESR Group to support investment in infrastructure projects across ASEAN member states. In 2023, it provided financing assurances and maturity extensions as part of Sri Lanka's sovereign debt restructuring negotiations linked to an IMF support program.

The bank has also provided more than US$1 billion in loans to the Maldives for infrastructure development, including airport upgrades, bridge construction, and port relocation projects.

China Exim Bank has played a central role in financing major Sri Lankan infrastructure projects since the mid‑2000s. After the Sri Lankan government was unable to secure funding from the United States or India for the development of the Hambantota Port, it turned to China for financing. In 2006, Sri Lanka and China agreed to encourage Chinese participation in the project and to use concessional Chinese loans for its development. Following meetings between Sri Lankan officials and China Exim Bank leadership, and a state visit to China by President Mahinda Rajapaksa in 2007, China Exim Bank agreed to provide the project's initial major loan. In subsequent years, the bank remained a key creditor to Sri Lanka. In 2023, it granted extensions on debt repayments originally due in 2022 and 2023 as part of broader restructuring negotiations.

== Capitalization and ownership ==
China Exim Bank was established in 1994 as a wholly state-owned institution. To broaden its funding base, it began issuing bonds through auction mechanisms in 1999. In 2015, China used a portion of its foreign exchange reserves to recapitalize the bank, significantly expanding its capacity to extend overseas lending.

As of 2019, the bank remained entirely state-owned. Its majority shareholder was Buttonwood Investment Holding Company Ltd., itself owned by the State Administration of Foreign Exchange, with the Ministry of Finance holding a minority stake.

== Organizational structure ==
=== Mainland branches ===
There are a total of 21 branches of the bank, in Anhui, Beijing, Chengdu, Chongqing, Dalian, Fujian, Guangdong, Heilongjiang, Hubei, Hunan, Jiangsu, Nanjing, Ningbo, Qingdao, Shanghai, Shanxi, Shenzhen, Tianjin, Xiamen, Xi'an, Xinjiang, Yunnan, and Zhejiang.

=== Board of Directors ===
Exim Bank has a twelve-member board of directors. Two are the executives in charge of managing Exim Bank. Six are directors from the agencies that hold shares of Exim Bank. The four "government-ministry directors" come from the National Development and Reform Commission, the Ministry of Finance, the Ministry of Commerce, and the State Administration of Foreign Exchange.

=== Chairmen ===
Name (English)	Name (Chinese)	Tenure begins	Tenure ends	Note
Tong Zhiguang	佟志广	1994	1998	
Zhou Keren	周可仁	1998	1999	
Yang Zilin	羊子林	1999	2005	
Li Ruogu	李若谷	2005	2015	
Hu Xiaolin	胡晓炼	2015	2022	
Wu Fulin	吴富林	June 2022		

=== Governors ===
Name (English)	Name (Chinese)	Tenure begins	Tenure ends	Note
Ren Shengjun	任生俊	August 2022	August 2024	
Wang Chunying	王春英	21 October 2024		

== See also ==
- China International Development Cooperation Agency
- Banking in China
- History of Banking in China
