= Michel Sapin =

French politician (born 1952)

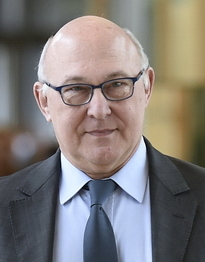
- Sapin in 2015

Minister of the Economy
- In office 30 August 2016 – 10 May 2017
- Prime Minister: Manuel Valls; Bernard Cazeneuve
- Preceded by: Emmanuel Macron
- Succeeded by: Bruno Le Maire

Minister of Finance
- In office 2 April 2014 – 17 May 2017
- Prime Minister: Manuel Valls; Bernard Cazeneuve
- Preceded by: Pierre Moscovici
- Succeeded by: Bruno Le Maire
- In office 2 April 1992 – 29 March 1993
- Prime Minister: Pierre Bérégovoy
- Preceded by: Pierre Bérégovoy
- Succeeded by: Edmond Alphandéry

Minister of Labour, Employment and Social Dialogue
- In office 16 May 2012 – 2 April 2014
- Prime Minister: Jean-Marc Ayrault
- Preceded by: Xavier Bertrand
- Succeeded by: François Rebsamen

Minister of the Civil Service
- In office 28 March 2000 – 7 May 2002
- Prime Minister: Lionel Jospin
- Preceded by: Émile Zuccarelli
- Succeeded by: Jean-Paul Delevoye

Personal details
- Born: 9 April 1952 (age 74) Boulogne-Billancourt, France
- Party: Socialist Party
- Education: Lycée Henri-IV
- Alma mater: École normale supérieure Paris-Sorbonne University; Sciences Po; École nationale d'administration

Michel Sapin (French pronunciation: [mi.ʃɛl sa.pɛ̃]; born 9 April 1952) is a French politician who served as Minister of Finance from 1992 to 1993 and again from 2014 to 2017. He is a member of the Socialist Party.

He was Minister of the Civil Service from 2000 to 2002 and Minister of Labour, Employment and Social Affairs from 2012 to 2014. Sapin has also served as a member of the National Assembly of France.

After President François Hollande took office, Sapin became the Minister of Labour, Employment and Social Affairs in the government headed by Prime Minister Jean-Marc Ayrault on 16 May 2012. Two years later, he was moved to the post of Minister of Finance under Ayrault's successor, Manuel Valls.

== Early life and education ==
Sapin was born on 9 April 1952 in Boulogne-Billancourt, Hauts-de-Seine, France. He attended the Lycée Henri IV, followed by Paris-Sorbonne University, where he received a B.A. in History and an MPhil in Geography. He then attended the École Normale Supérieure, the Institut d'études politiques de Paris, and the École nationale d'administration. He graduated from the ENA as part of the Promotion Voltaire, which also included François Hollande, Dominique de Villepin, Ségolène Royal and Renaud Donnedieu de Vabres. He became an administrative law judge.

== Political career ==
From 1989 to 1994, Sapin served as councillor for Nanterre. From 1995 to 2001, he was the Mayor of Argenton-sur-Creuse. He has served again as such since 2002. He served as Deputy Minister of Justice from May 1991 to April 1992, Finance Minister from April 1992 to March 1993, and Minister of Civil Servants and State Reforms from March 2000 to May 2002.

In the Socialist Party's 2011 primaries, Sapin endorsed François Hollande as the party's candidate for the 2012 presidential election.

In 2012 Sapin was appointed Minister of Social Affairs by President Hollande. From April 2014, he then served as head of a newly created ministry dealing with public finances under Prime Minister Manuel Valls.

On 30 August 2016, following the resignation of Emmanuel Macron as Minister of the Economy in preparation for Macron to be sworn-in as President, the duties of the office were added to Sapin’s remit. He thus became the Minister for the Economy and Finance.

Sapin supported Manuel Valls in the Socialist Party primary of 2017. Following Valls’ defeat to Benoît Hamon, he supported Hamon in the presidential election while also defending Francois Hollande’s record as president.

== Political positions ==
In March 2016, Sapin stated his opposition to universal basic income in an interview with France Info.

== Honours ==
During his audience with the President of Cameroon Paul Biya, Sapin was appointed an Officer of the Order of Valor on 8 April 2016.

On 26 September 2016, Sapin was awarded the Sash rank of the Order of the Aztec Eagle by the then president of Mexico, Enrique Peña Nieto.

== Personal life ==
When President Hollande published a list of bank deposits and property held by all 38 ministers for first time 2012, Sapin declared personal assets worth 2 million euros.

In the remainder of the case concerning the indemnities wrongly paid to Sapin while he was mayor of Argenton-sur-Creuse, the administrative court of Limoges by order of 30 March 2017 has just rejected the personal request of Sapin and Of the other elected representatives of Argenton who had formed a third party against the judgment of 29 September 2016.

== Bibliography ==
- L'État en mouvement (2002), Bruno Leprince
- Jamais sans l'Europe ! Entretiens croisés de deux Européens convaincus with Wolfgang Schäuble (2016), Débats Publics. ISBN 9782916962962
- L’Écume et l'Océan, Chronique d'un ministre du travail par gros temps (2014), Flammarion ISBN 2081333708

Political offices
Preceded by Pierre Bérégovoy	Minister of Finance; 1992–1993	Succeeded by Edmond Alphandéry
Preceded by Émile Zuccarelli	Minister of the Civil Service; 2000–2002	Succeeded by Jean-Paul Delevoye
Preceded by Xavier Bertrand	Minister of Labour, Employment and Social Dialogue; 2012–2014	Succeeded by François Rebsamen
Preceded by Pierre Moscovici	Minister of Finance; 2014–2017	Succeeded by Bruno Le Maire
Preceded by Emmanuel Macron	Minister of the Economy, Industry and Digital Affairs; 2016–2017	Succeeded by Bruno Le Maire
