= Edmond Alphandéry =

French politician

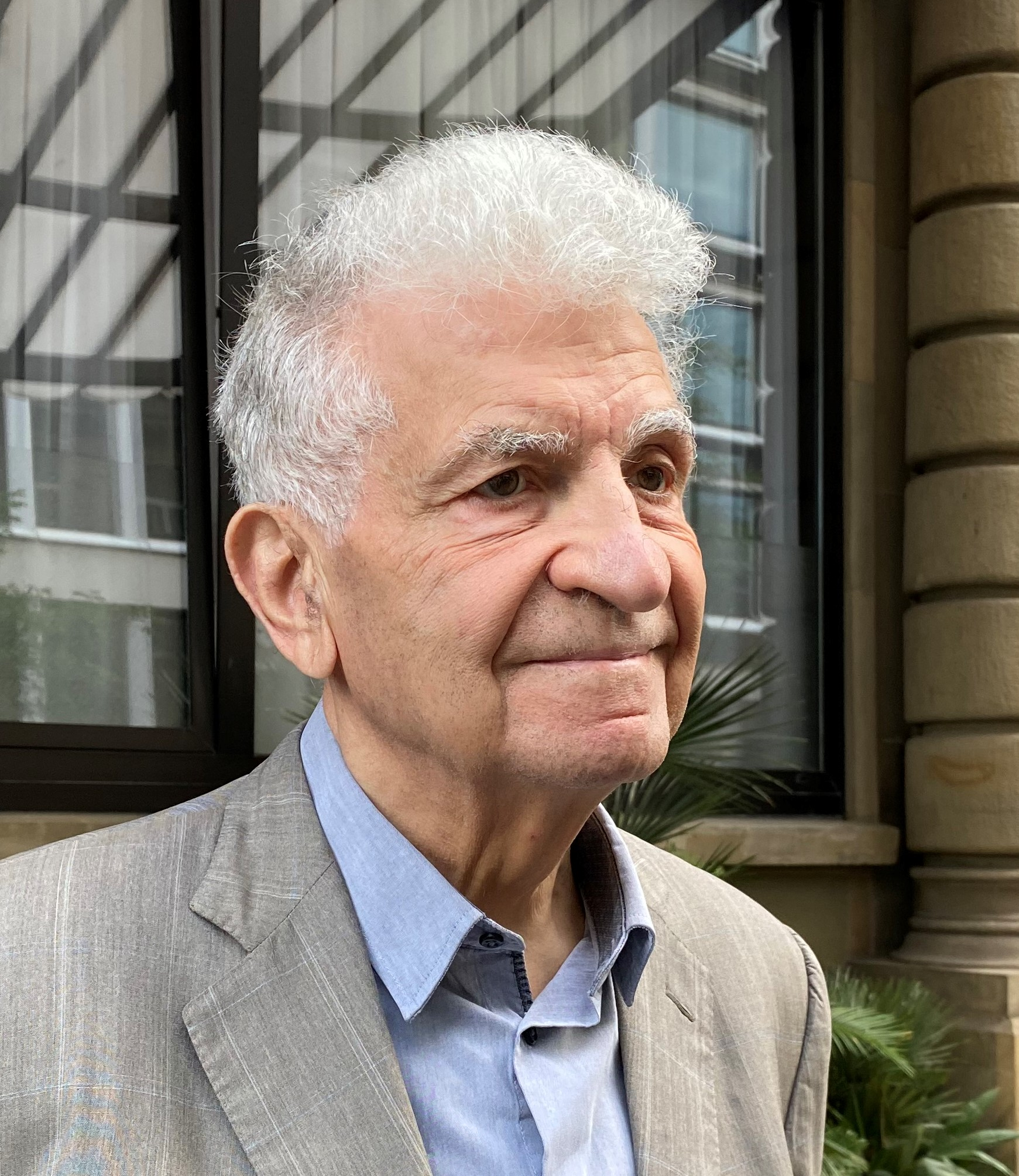

Minister of the Economy, Finances and Industry
- In office 1993–1995
- President: François Mitterrand
- Prime Minister: Édouard Balladur
- Preceded by: Michel Sapin
- Succeeded by: Alain Madelin

Member of the National Assembly for Maine-et-Loire's 3rd constituency
- In office 1978–1993
- Preceded by: Paul Boudon
- Succeeded by: Christian Martin

Personal details
- Born: 2 September 1943 (age 83) Avignon, France
- Party: UDF
- Education: Sciences Po

Edmond Alphandéry (French pronunciation: [ɛdmɔ̃ alfɑ̃deʁi]; born 2 September 1943) is a French politician, public-sector company executive, and public policy advocate. He was the French Minister of Economy and Finance from 1993 to 1995, executive chairman of Électricité de France from 1995 to 1998, and chairman of CNP Assurances from 1998 to 2012. In 1999 he founded the Euro 50 Group, and has been its chairman since then.

== Education and early employment ==
- Sciences Po – Fulbright Fellowship (1967–1968)
- University of Chicago – Associate of Political Economy/Doctorate in Economics
- Professor of Economics at Panthéon-Assas University

== Training, employment and political career ==
- Deputy UDF for Maine-et-Loire from 1978 to 1993
- General Council Member for the District of Longué-Jumelles (Maine-et-Loire) from 1976 to March 2008.
- President of the General Council of Maine-et-Loire (1994–1995)
- Mayor of Longué-Jumelles from 1977 to March 2008.
- Minister of Economy from 1993 to 1995 under Prime Minister Édouard Balladur.

== Minister of Economy and Finance ==
- He was Minister of Economy from 1993 to 1995 during the government of Édouard Balladur. Some of his most notable actions as Minister are:
- Act of 19 July 1993: privatization program (Credit Local de France, Rhone-Poulenc, Banque Nationale de Paris, Elf-Aquitaine, Union des Assurances de Paris, Seita)
- Increased state participation in the capital of Renault
- Restructuring of public enterprises in financial review (Air France, Credit Lyonnais). He said that the mounting rescue Credit Lyonnais would be "painless for the taxpayers," while according to an estimate of the Court of Auditors in 1999, the loss would be 14.8 billion euros
- Change in the status of the Banque de France (Act of 4 August 1993)
- Stimulating household consumption (premium States for the purchase of new motor vehicles)
- Entering into final negotiations of the Uruguay Round
- Convincing member states of the franc zone to accept a substantial devaluation of the CFA franc
- Publication of the Consumer Code.

== Later positions ==
- President of Électricité de France (EDF Energy) from 1995 to 1998
- Director of the think-tank Friends of Europe
- Member of the Trilateral Commission
- Chairman of the Board of Directors of CNP Assurances and CNP International.
- Chairman of the Centre des Professions Financières
- Director of Engie, Calyon, Icade of Caixa Seguros (Brazil), CNP Capitalia Vita (Italy), the media company Parisian Posters of * GT Finance
- Member of the European Advisory Board to Nomura Securities
- President of Centre for European Policy Studies
- Founding chairman of Euro 50 Group since 1998

Political offices
Preceded by Michel Sapin	Minister of the Economy; 1993–1995	Succeeded by Alain Madelin
Business positions
Preceded by Gilles Ménage	CEO of Électricité de France; 1995–1998	Succeeded by François Roussely
