= Euro 50 Group =

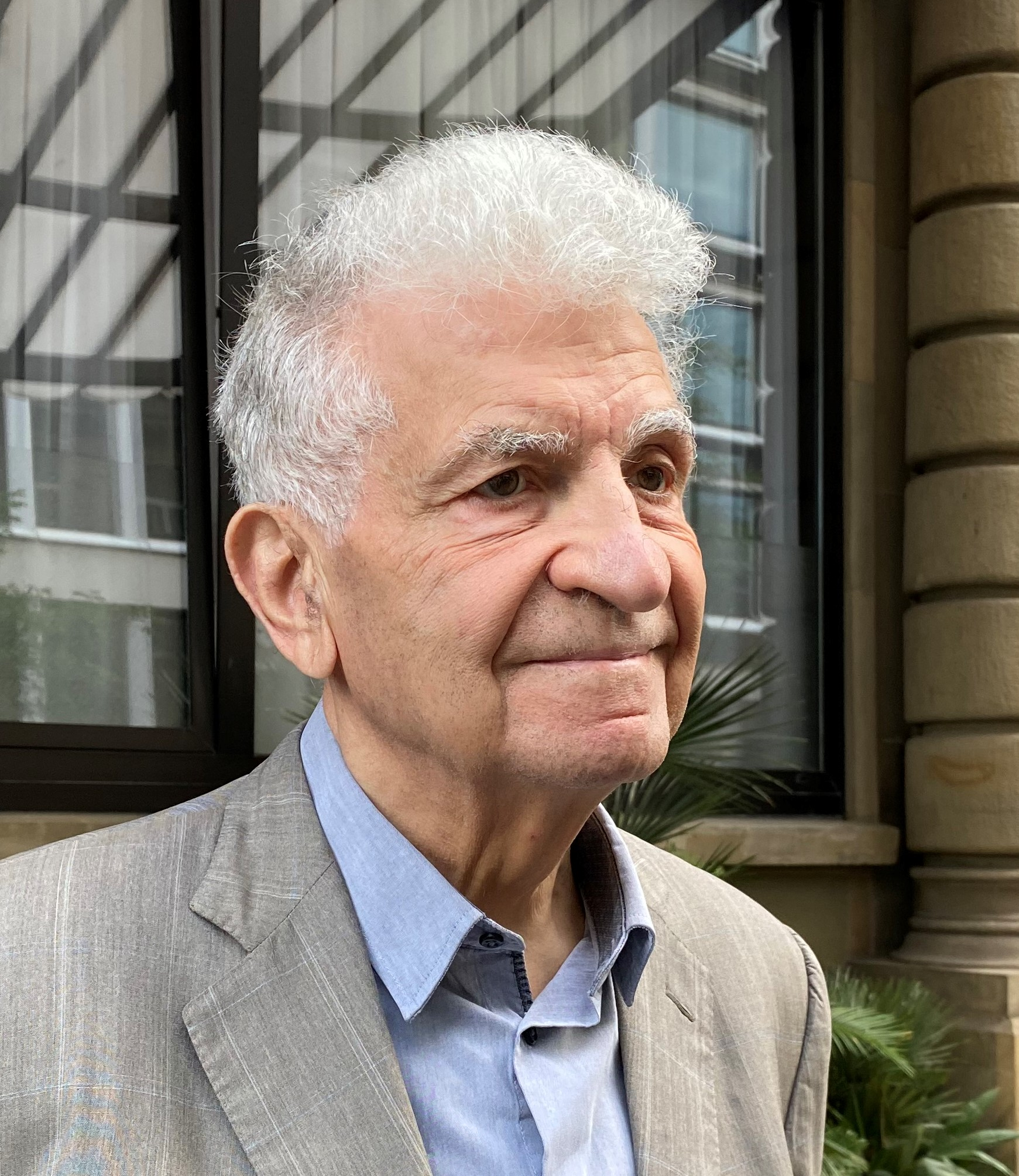
Edmond Alphandéry, founder of the Euro 50 Group

The Euro 50 Group, sometimes Euro50, is a group of individuals that organizes non-public meetings to debate European economic and financial policy themes, with an emphasis on monetary policy and the euro area. It is led by Edmond Alphandéry, who created it in 1999 with the help of Alexandre Lamfalussy.

== Activity ==
The Euro 50 Group's activity is not public, and the group does not maintain a website. It organizes several meetings every year in locations around Europe and in Washington, D.C., the latter on the occasion of Spring meetings and Annual Meetings of the International Monetary Fund and World Bank. Participants to Euro 50 Group meetings include "high level economists, bankers and officials from different countries."

The Euro 50 Group meetings are occasionally organized in partnership with other think tanks. Such partners have included the China Finance 40 Forum, the Centre for International Governance Innovation, the Peterson Institute for International Economics, and the Reinventing Bretton Woods Committee.

As of the late 2010s, the Euro 50 Group was supported by France's Caisse des Dépôts via a nonprofit entity, the Association pour la Stabilité Financière Internationale.

Leading public policy officials who have participated in Euro 50 Group meetings have included Alan Greenspan, Mario Draghi, Malcolm Knight, Jyrki Katainen,François Villeroy de Galhau and Joachim Nagel.

== See also ==
- Group of Thirty
- China Finance 40 Forum
