= Pan Gongsheng =

Chinese economist, banker, reformist and government official

- 潘功胜
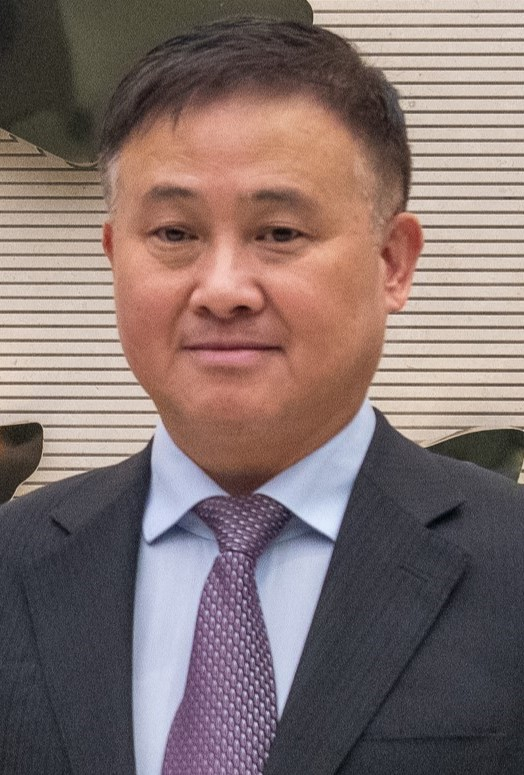
- Pan in 2023

13th Governor of the People's Bank of China
- Incumbent
- Assumed office 25 July 2023
- Premier: Li Qiang
- Preceded by: Yi Gang

Director of the State Administration of Foreign Exchange
- In office 12 January 2016 – 24 November 2023
- Premier: Li Keqiang; Li Qiang
- Preceded by: Yi Gang
- Succeeded by: Zhu Hexin

Deputy Governor of the People's Bank of China
- In office December 2012 – 25 July 2023
- Governor: Zhou Xiaochuan; Yi Gang

Personal details
- Born: 8 July 1963 (age 62) Anqing, Anhui, China
- Party: Chinese Communist Party
- Education: Renmin University of China (PhD)

Pan Gongsheng (Chinese: 潘功胜; pinyin: Pān Gōngshèng; born July 8, 1963) is a Chinese economist and politician who is the current Chinese Communist Party Committee Secretary and governor of the People's Bank of China (PBC). He served as the Director of the State Administration of Foreign Exchange from 2016 to 2023. At the PBC, he has worked on the monetary policy of China.

== Education ==
Pan received his Ph.D. in economics from Renmin University of China. He did his post-doctoral research at Cambridge University and was a research fellow at Harvard University.

== Career ==
=== Commercial Banking ===
Pan was Vice President of Agricultural Bank of China from 2008-2010. Prior to Agricultural Bank Pan worked at Industrial and Commercial Bank of China in a number of positions.

=== People's Bank of China ===
In 2012, Pan joined the People's Bank of China as Deputy Governor, and later assumed leadership of State Administration of Foreign Exchange, as its administrator. Pan leads Leading Group of Internet Financial Risks Remediation, which has been tasked with clamping down on Bitcoin and cryptocurrency in China.

He is also a member of the Academic Committee of the China Finance 40 Forum (CF40). In July 2023, he was appointed as the secretary of the People's Bank of China Committee of the Chinese Communist Party, succeeding Guo Shuqing.

In 2023, Pan was appointed as the Governor of the People's Bank of China. As central bank governor, he believed in a new formation of global currency order, with the renminbi competing in a multi-polar system. He also cited concerns about reliance on the US dollar.

In June 2025, he met with president of the European Central Bank, Christine Lagarde, in Beijing to discuss cooperation on central banking.

Party political offices
Preceded by Guo Shuqing	Communist Party Secretary of the People's Bank of China; 2023–present	Incumbent
Government offices
Preceded by Yi Gang	Director of the State Administration of Foreign Exchange; 2016–2023	Succeeded by Zhu Hexin
Preceded by Yi Gang	Governor of the People's Bank of China; 2023–present	Incumbent
