= Shanghai Academy of Social Sciences =

Chinese think tank and front organization

- Established: 1958; 68 years ago
- Focus: Humanities and social sciences
- President: Zhang Daogen (张道根)
- Location: 215, 7/622, Huaihai Zhong Lu, Huangpu District, Shanghai, China

Chinese name
- Simplified Chinese: 上海社会科学院
- Traditional Chinese: 上海社會科學院
Transcriptions
Standard Mandarin
- Hanyu Pinyin: Shànghǎi Shèhuì Kēxuéyuàn
- Website: www.sass.org.cn

The Shanghai Academy of Social Sciences (SASS; Chinese: 上海社会科学院) was founded in 1958 and is China's oldest think tank for the humanities and social sciences. It is the country's second largest such institution, after the Chinese Academy of Social Sciences (CASS) in Beijing. Besides funds from the municipal government of Shanghai, the academy draws financial support from non-governmental sources at home and abroad.

== Relationship with the Shanghai State Security Bureau ==
The Federal Bureau of Investigation (FBI) has stated that SASS frequently provides cover to intelligence operatives of the Ministry of State Security (MSS)'s Shanghai State Security Bureau. The FBI adds that the MSS "uses SASS employees as spotters and assessors."

In 2017, ex-CIA officer Kevin Mallory was having financial difficulties when he was contacted by a "headhunter" on LinkedIn, who turned out to be an MSS operative. The operative set up a phone call with Mallory and another person, pretending it was a job with the Shanghai Academy of Social Sciences. Mallory consented to selling defense secrets to his Chinese contacts after two visits to Shanghai.

== See also ==
- Center of Jewish Studies Shanghai
- Chinese Academy of Social Science
- Chinese Academy of Sciences
- Scientific publishing in China
- Shanghai Development Research Foundation
