= Wu Xiaoling =

Chinese economist

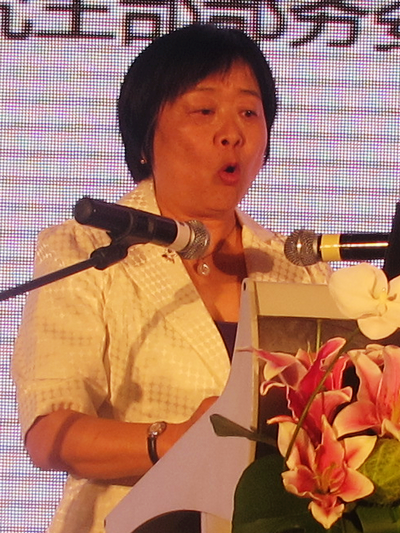
Wu Xiaoling

Wu Xiaoling (born January 1947, Chinese: 吴晓灵) is a native of Weiyuan, Sichuan Province, and a former graduate of the Graduate School of the People's Bank of China. She has held a long tenure at the People's Bank of China and is the inaugural female director of the State Administration of Foreign Exchange.

== Biography ==
Wu Xiaoling obtained a master's degree in economics from the Graduate School of the People's Bank of China (now the PBC School of Finance at Tsinghua University) in 1984 and subsequently remained in the institution as a researcher. In 1985, she was appointed deputy director of the Applied Theory Department at the Institute of the People's Bank of China, and then became deputy editor-in-chief of the Financial Times in 1988. Since her return to the central bank in 1991, Wu has held positions as deputy director of the Department of Financial System Reform, director of the Policy Research Office, and both deputy and director of the State Administration of Foreign Exchange (SAFE), making her the first female director of SAFE in China. From 1998 to 2000, she held the position of governor of the Shanghai Branch of the People's Bank of China (PBC), and in April 2001, she ascended to the role of deputy governor of the PBC while simultaneously serving as the director of the State Administration of Foreign Exchange (SAFE). She is a member of the board of governors of the PBOC, the largest and most esteemed institution in China.

In January 2008, at the age of 61, Wu Xiaoling resigned from her position as deputy governor of the central bank. Subsequently, in March 2008, she was elected to the Standing Committee of the National People's Congress (NPC) during the inaugural session of the 11th NPC and appointed vice chairman of the Finance and Economic Committee. In March 2013, she was reelected to the Standing Committee of the 12th NPC and retained her role as vice chairman of the Financial and Economic Affairs Committee.
