= Wu Fulin =

Chinese banker and politician

- 吴富林

Chairman of the Export–Import Bank of China
- Incumbent
- Assumed office 10 June 2022
- Preceded by: Hu Xiaolian

Governor of the Export–Import Bank of China
- In office April 2020 – April 2022
- Preceded by: Zhang Qingsong
- Succeeded by: Ren Shengjun

Personal details
- Born: 1963 (age 62–63) China
- Party: Chinese Communist Party
- Education: Fudan University

Chinese name
- Simplified Chinese: 吴富林
- Traditional Chinese: 吳富林
Transcriptions
Standard Mandarin
- Hanyu Pinyin: Wú Fùlín

Wu Fulin (Chinese: 吴富林; born 1963) is a Chinese banker and politician, currently serving as chairman of the Export–Import Bank of China. He is a representative of the 20th National Congress of the Chinese Communist Party and a member of the 14th National Committee of the Chinese People's Political Consultative Conference.

== Early life and education ==
Wu was born in 1963 and graduated from Fudan University.

== Career ==
Wu worked in China Everbright Bank, where he eventually became deputy general manager in 2015.

Wu joined the Bank of China in October 2018, and was elevated to vice governor two months later.

Wu was appointed deputy party secretary of the Export–Import Bank of China in January 2020, concurrently serving as governor and vice chairman. He rose to party secretary, the top political position in the bank, in April 2022. He was chosen as chairman in June 2022.

In March 2023, Wu was selected as a member of the Foreign Affairs Committee of the 14th National Committee of the Chinese People's Political Consultative Conference.

Business positions
Preceded by Zhang Qingsong	Governor of the Export–Import Bank of China; 2020–2022	Succeeded by Ren Shengjun
Preceded by Hu Xiaolian	Chairman of the Export–Import Bank of China; 2022–present	Incumbent
