= Hu Xiaolian =

Chinese politician

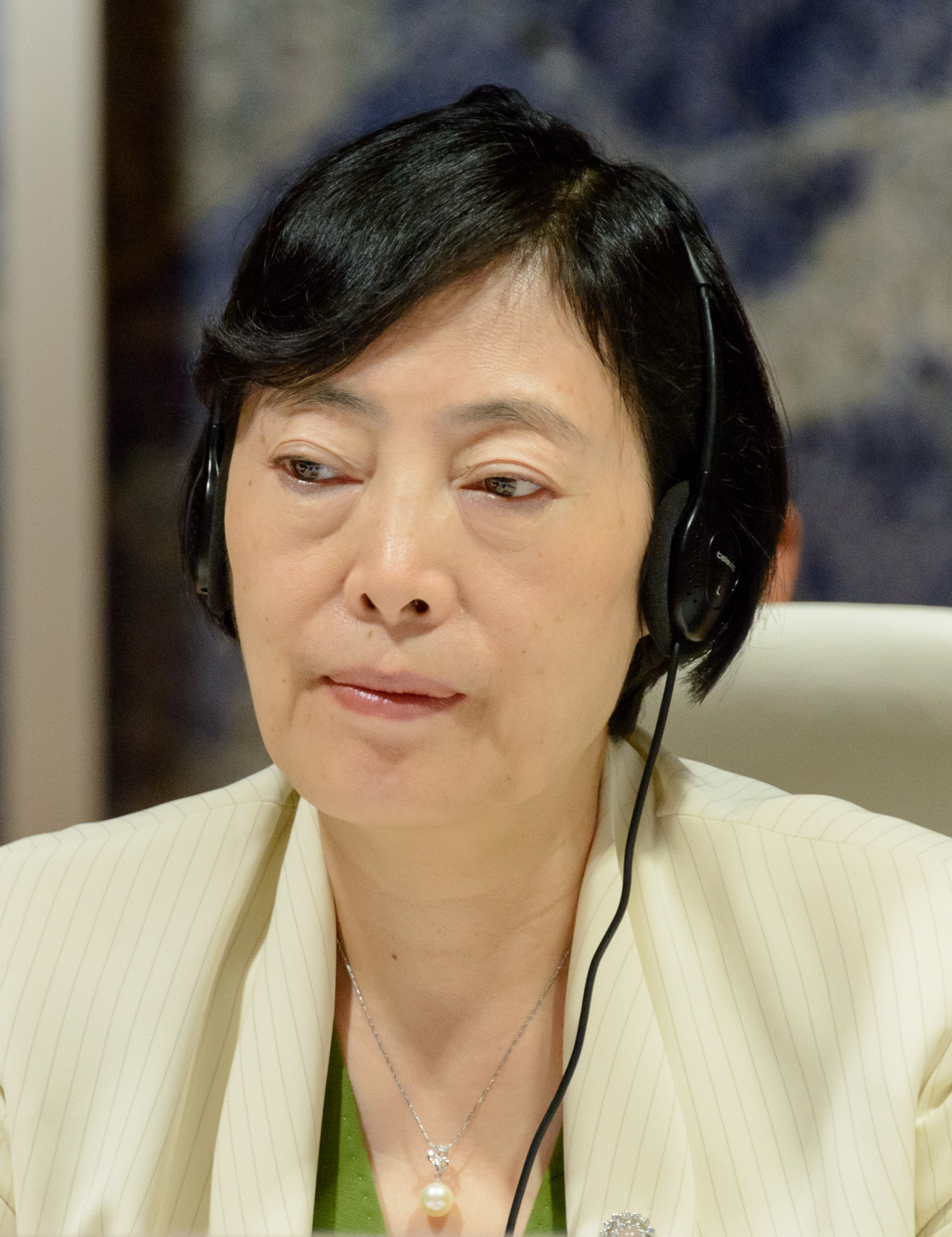
- Hu at a TDB Session in 2017
- Born: May 1958 (age 67–68); Guangshui, Suizhou, Hubei, China
- Political party: Chinese Communist Party

Hu Xiaolian (Chinese: 胡晓炼; born May 1958) is a Chinese economist and former Deputy Governor of the People's Bank of China and director of the State Administration of Foreign Exchange in China. In 2007, she was ranked 23rd on The Wall Street Journal's "The 50 Women to Watch 2007" list. In 2008, she was ranked fourth on The Wall Street Journal's "The 50 Women to Watch 2008" list and was referred to as "one of the most powerful people in the world".

Hu was elected an alternate of the Central Committee of the Chinese Communist Party at the November 2012 18th National Congress of the Chinese Communist Party.

== Biography ==
Born in Hubei in 1958, Hu graduated from the Graduate School of the People's Bank of China with an MA in economics in 1984. Hu served as Director of the State Administration of Foreign Exchange from 2007–2009. In 2009, she was appointed Deputy Governor of the People's Bank of China.

She is also an adviser to the China Finance 40 Forum (CF40).

In February 2015, Hu was elected as the Chairwoman and Party Secretary of the Export-Import Bank of China (Exim Bank).

In 2020, China joined the G20-led Debt Service Suspension Initiative, through which official bilateral creditors suspended debt repayments of 73 of the poorest debtor countries. At the 2021 Boao Forum, Hu stated that the interest of both debtors and creditors should be considered in debt suspension. Hu stated, "Debt suspension is neither debt reduction nor debt cancellation. It is an adjustment made to tackle difficulties at specific times" and that outright cancellation weakens financial stability.

She served as the top-ranked official at Exim Bank until 2022.
