= State Administration of Foreign Exchange =

Chinese State-owned Agency

State Administration of Foreign Exchange (SAFE)
- 国家外汇管理局; Guójiā wàihuì guǎnlǐ jú
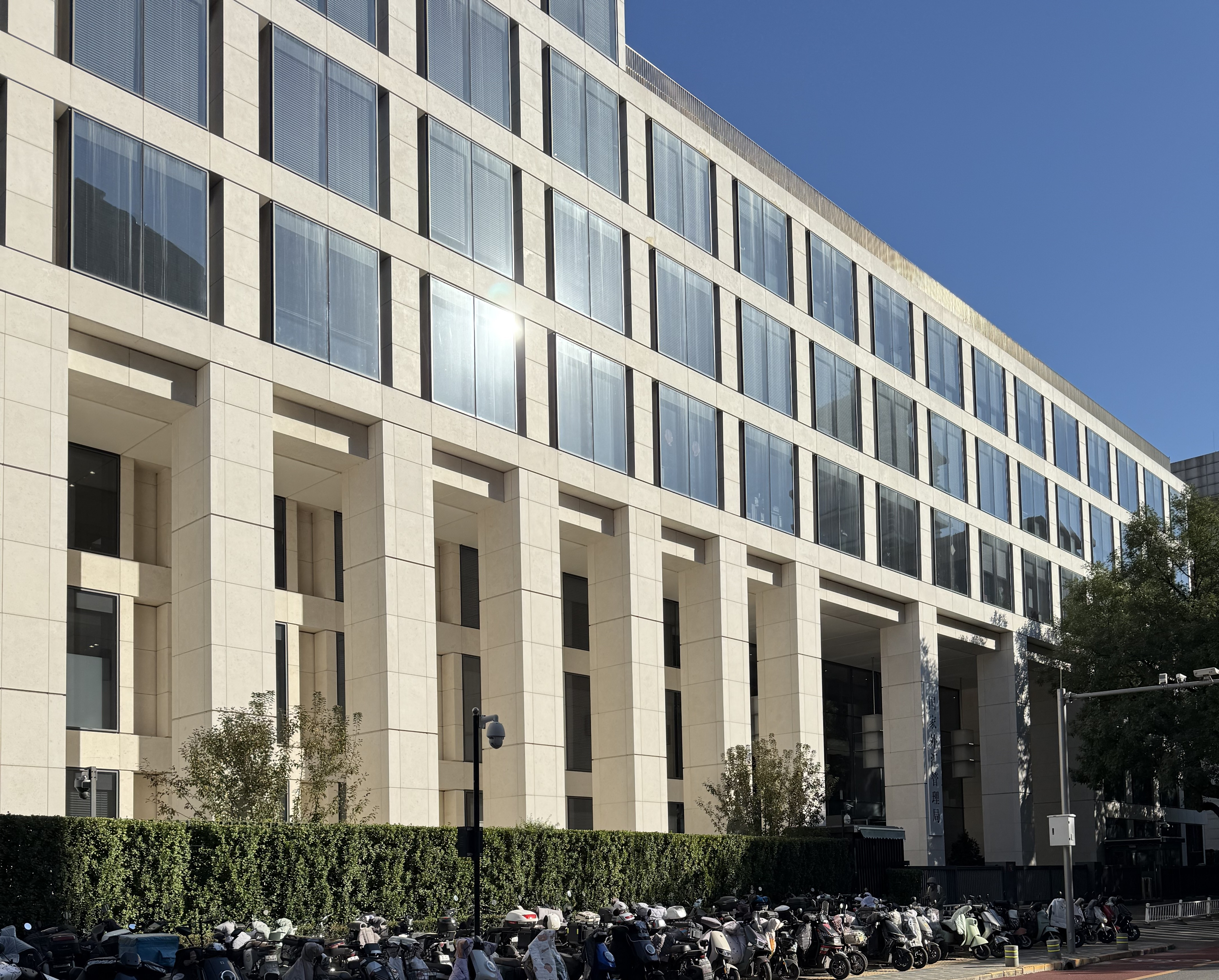
- SAFE head office, part of the People's Bank of China complex on Beijing Financial Street

Agency overview
- Formed: June 1979; 47 years ago
- Jurisdiction: China
- Headquarters: Beijing
- Agency executive: Zhu Hexin
- Parent agency: People's Bank of China
- Child agency: SAFE Investment Company
- Website: www.safe.gov.cn

State Administration of Foreign Exchange
- Simplified Chinese: 国家外汇管理局
- Traditional Chinese: 國家外匯管理局
Transcriptions
Standard Mandarin
- Hanyu Pinyin: Guójiā wàihuì guǎnlǐ jú

The State Administration of Foreign Exchange (SAFE) of the People's Republic of China is an administrative agency under the State Council tasked with drafting rules and regulations governing foreign exchange market activities, and managing the state foreign-exchange reserves, which as of April 2026 stood at $3.41 trillion for the People's Bank of China. The current director is Zhu Hexin.

== Background ==
In 1979, the State Council approved the People's Bank of China's Proposal on the Reform of China's Banking System. This resulted in the establishment of the State Central Administration of Foreign Exchange (SCAFE), which managed China's then-small amount of foreign reserves. Although under the authority of the State Council, SCAFE was administered by the People's Bank of China. After the State Council reorganization in 1983, SCAFE became a subsidiary of the People's Bank of China and became known by its current name, the State Administration of Foreign Exchange. In 1988, SAFE was elevated to report directly to the State Council, but remained under People's Bank of China's management.

SAFE has a vice-ministry level position within the Chinese bureaucracy. Historically, its lead executive has also generally held the position of vice governor of the People's Bank of China.

== Function ==
SAFE is the foreign exchange management administrative body of the People's Bank of China.

SAFE's existence and role were initially closely guarded secrets, its subsidiaries were minor, but the funds under management have increased significantly in recent years. They were responsible for running SAFE's portfolio across the various time zones, replicating the investments of head office in Beijing.

SAFE created and controlled the Central Huijin Investment, but in September 2007, it sold Central Huijin to the newly formed sovereign wealth fund, China Investment Corporation (CIC).

With the burgeoning of China's reserves and amidst increasing rivalry between state agencies, there are signs of growing independence of and competition between the subsidiaries.

Since CIC entered global markets shortly before the 2008 financial crisis, its initial performance was lackluster. This in turn created a political opening for SAFE to expand the sovereign funds under its jurisdiction, which it did in 2013.

SAFE's sovereign funds invest part of China's foreign exchange reserves in investment vehicles including infrastructure projects, real estate, private equity, and strategic resources. SAFE's sovereign funds invest in both foreign and domestic Chinese companies. It has indirectly contributed to the financing of the Belt and Road Initiative, including through its 65% ownership of the Silk Road Fund. It contributed some of the Fund's initial capital, along with China Development Bank, CIC, and Export-Import Bank of China.

The SAFE Co-Financing Office extends foreign exchange entrusted loans to qualified Chinese companies seeking to engage in foreign investment, merger, or acquisition. SAFE provides preferential loan access to the strategically important state-owned enterprises of the State-Owned Assets Supervision and Administration Commission (SASAC).

== Management ==
The current Administrator of SAFE is Zhu Hexin. Zheng Wei, Li Hongyan and Xu Zhibin are Deputy Administrators.

=== Directors ===
Name	Chinese name	Took office	Left office	Ref.
Bu Ming	卜明	June 1979	April 1982	
Tang Gengyao	唐赓尧	April 1982	December 1990	
Yin Jieyan	殷介炎	December 1990	January 1994	
Zhu Xiaohua	朱小华	January 1994	September 1995	
Zhou Xiaochuan	周小川	September 1995	April 1998	
Wu Xiaoling	吴晓灵	April 1998	October 1998	
Li Fuxiang	李福祥	October 1998	May 2000	
Wu Xiaoling	吴晓灵	May 2000	April 2001	
Guo Shuqing	郭树清	April 2001	March 2005	
Hu Xiaolian	胡晓炼	March 2005	July 2009	
Yi Gang	易纲	17 July 2009	12 January 2016	
Pan Gongsheng	潘功胜	12 January 2016	24 November 2023	
Zhu Hexin	朱鹤新	24 November 2023	Incumbent	

== Structure ==
- SAFE Head Office
  - General Affairs Department (Policy and Regulation Department)
  - Balance of Payments Department
  - Current Account Management Department
  - Capital Account Management Department
  - Supervision and Inspection Department
  - Reserves Management Department
  - Human Resources Department (Internal Auditing Department)
  - Science and Technology Department
- Institutions affiliated with the SAFE
  - Central Foreign Exchange Business Center
  - Information Center
  - General Services Center
  - Editorial Office of the Foreign Exchange of China journal.
- Major overseas investment entities of SAFE
  - SAFE Investment Company Limited (华安投资有限公司), registered in Hong Kong, China, on June 2, 1997
  - Investment Company of the People's Republic of China (华新投资有限公司), registered in Singapore, on September 10, 2008
  - Gingko Tree Investment LTD (华欧投资有限公司), registered in London, United Kingdom, on December 11, 2009,
  - Beryl Datura Investment Limited, registered in British Virgin Islands, 2012
  - Trading room in Frankfurt (法兰克福交易室), registered in Frankfurt, Germany, 2012

== Functions ==
- drafting laws, standards, policies and reform of the forex administration system
- risk management and monitoring of balance of payments and the external credit and external debt
- development and supervision of the foreign exchange market,
- setting Renminbi convertibility / exchange rate policy
- operations and management of foreign exchange reserves, gold reserves, and other foreign exchange assets of the state.
- regulating Cryptocurrency

== Investments ==
The magnitude of China's reserves is disclosed, but not its composition. At the end of 2006, approximately 70 percent of the reserves were in U.S. dollar assets, 20 per cent in euros and 10 per cent in other currencies, according to economist Brad Setser. Most of China's currency reserves are invested in high grade U.S.-dollar-denominated debt, such as U.S. Treasuries, though as early as 2007 it was estimated that SAFE held $100 billion worth of U.S. mortgage-backed securities, hoping to achieve higher returns than those on U.S. Treasuries.

"The Hong Kong subsidiary is notably taking more risk in managing reserves," according to an informed source. The Financial Times reported on 4 January 2008 that the Hong Kong branch had bought stakes of less than 1 percent in both Commonwealth Bank of Australia and Australia and New Zealand Banking Group, respectively Australia's second and third-biggest lender by assets, over the preceding two months. The ANZ purchase has been confirmed by the bank. SAFE also invested in BP and Total in April 2008.

SAFE owns 65 percent of the Silk Road Fund.

SAFE owns the company Buttonwood Investment Holding Company Ltd. As of 2019, Buttonwood is the majority owner of Export-Import Bank of China and is an owner of China Development Bank, which are two of China's policy banks.

=== 2008 diversification and losses ===
As the reserves continue to grow, the central bank is aiming to boost investment returns on its foreign-exchange holdings by making somewhat riskier but higher-yielding investments. Pronouncements of Chinese officials are consequently closely scrutinised; each trade is reportedly up to US$1 billion. As part of diversification in 2008, SAFE acquired small stakes in dozens of companies including British companies Rio Tinto, Royal Dutch Shell, BP, Barclays, Tesco and RBS.

Brad Setser, speaking in March 2009 said losses as a result of this diversification at the peak of the market "would exceed US$80 billion."

Brad Setser said: "SAFE has built up one of the largest US equity portfolios of any foreign government entity investing abroad, including the major sovereign wealth funds....It appears SAFE began diversifying into equities early in 2007 and, rather than being deterred by the subprime crisis, it continued to buy."

=== 2009 investment policy ===
On March 23, 2009, deputy governor of China's central bank, Hu Xiaolian told reporter: "China will continue investing in U.S. government bonds while paying close attention to possible fluctuations in the value of those assets.... Investing in U.S. Treasury bonds is an important component of China's foreign currency reserve investments..."

== Branches ==
SAFE has branches and offices in all provinces, autonomous regions and municipalities. As of 2005, it had 36 branch offices, 298 central sub-branches and 508 sub-branches.

It has branches in Hong Kong, Singapore, London and New York.

The Hong Kong office (华安公司 SAFE Investment Company Ltd) was set up just in June 1997, before the handover of Hong Kong, and served an important role in defending the value of the Renminbi and Hong Kong dollar's peg to the US dollar against international speculators. It was a minor outpost for SAFE for several years, with only about $20bn in funds under management.

== See also ==
- Foreign-exchange reserves
- Foreign exchange reserves of China
- List of countries by foreign exchange reserves
